= Defection of Viktor Belenko =

Defection of a Soviet fighter pilot to Japan

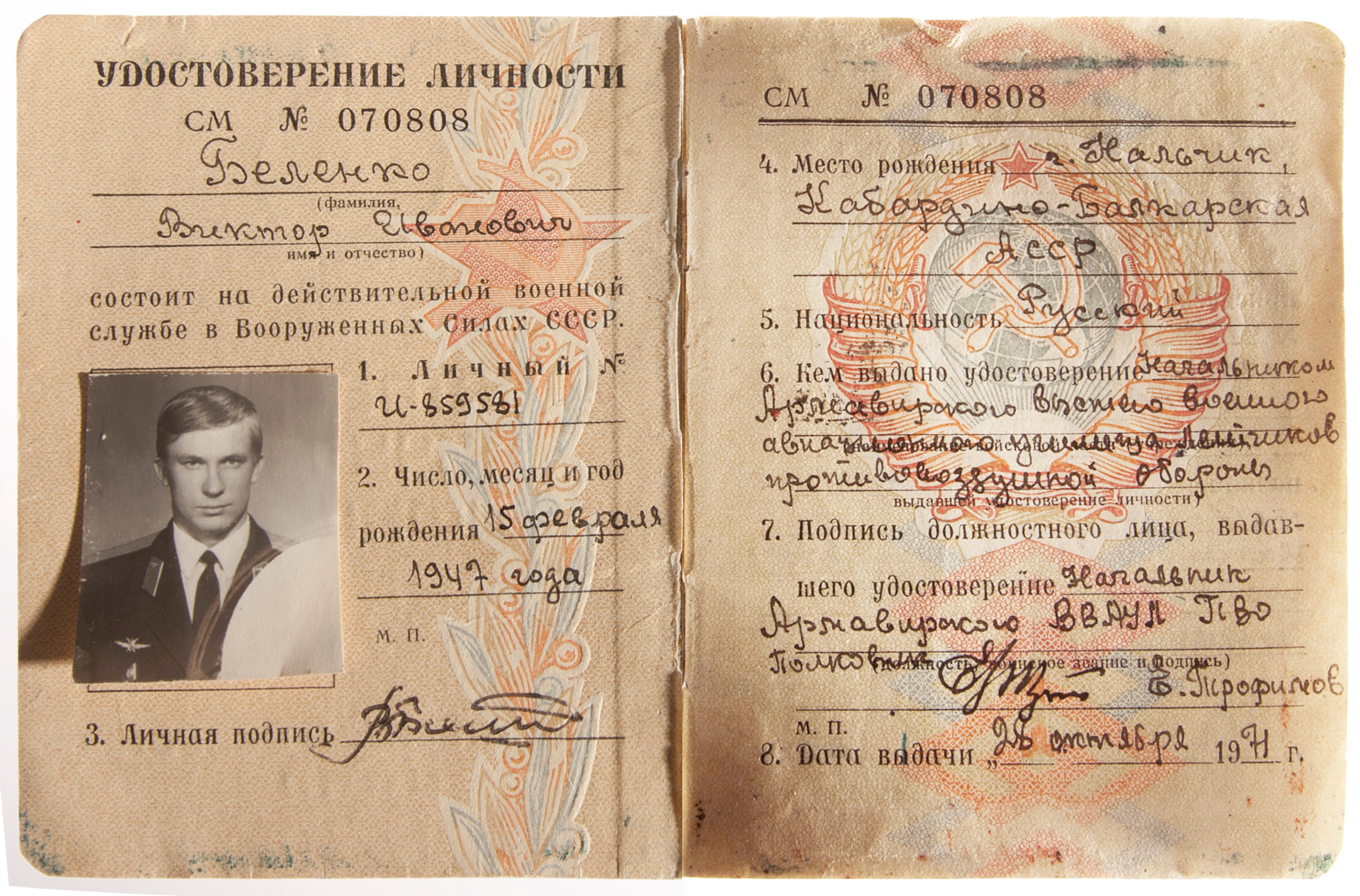
Viktor Belenko's military ID

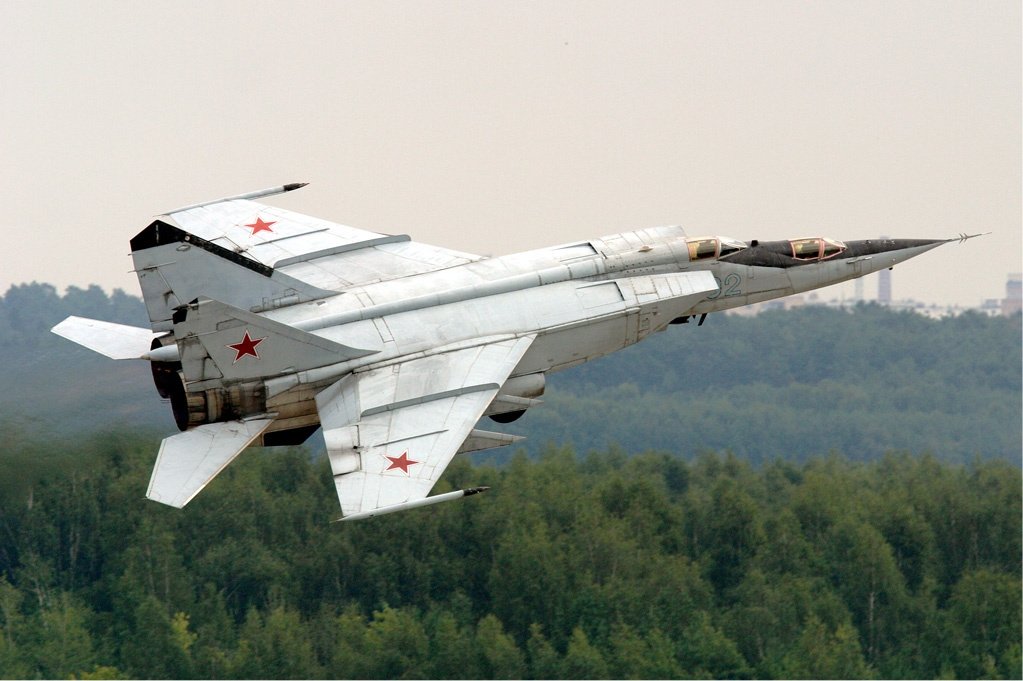
A MiG-25PU two-seat trainer

On September 6, 1976, Lieutenant Viktor Belenko of the Soviet Air Defense Forces defected by flying his Mikoyan-Gurevich MiG-25P "Foxbat" aircraft from near Vladivostok in the Far East of the Soviet Union to Hakodate Airport in Hokkaido Prefecture of Japan.

Belenko's defection caused tension between Japan and the Soviet Union, especially after Japanese and American specialists disassembled and examined the aircraft. The examination revealed to the US that while impressive in speed, the MiG-25 was not the superfighter that they had feared it to be. It was later returned to the Soviets while it was still disassembled with some parts missing.

Belenko was granted political asylum in and later citizenship of the US, where he became a military consultant, public speaker, and businessman. Belenko later visited Moscow in 1995, after the end of the Soviet Union.

== Background ==
During the Cold War, there were many defections by pilots and aircrews. In addition to pilots defecting of their own volition, there were Western efforts to encourage defections, beginning with the US Operation Moolah aimed at encouraging MiG-15 pilots in North Korea to defect. The Kuomintang (KMT) that was ruling the Republic of China in Taiwan offered gold to defecting pilots from the People's Republic of China, and the US Operation Fast Buck was similar to Operation Moolah, although aimed at encouraging a MiG-21 pilot in North Vietnam to defect. Operation Diamond was an Israeli operation similar to Operation Fast Buck, and was successful in getting an Iraqi pilot to defect with his MiG-21.

Belenko was not the only pilot to have defected from the Soviet Union in this way or the first such to defect from a Soviet-bloc country. In March and May 1953, two Polish Air Force pilots flew MiG-15s to Denmark. Later in 1953, North Korean pilot No Kum Sok flew his MiG-15 to an American air base in South Korea; this MiG is on permanent display at the National Museum of the United States Air Force. Later Soviet Captain Aleksandr Zuyev flew his MiG-29 to Trabzon, Turkey, on May 20, 1989. The MiG-29 was returned to the Soviet Union.

In September 1976, Belenko was stationed in Chuguyevka Air Base in the Far East. The infrastructure in the base was severely lacking, the troops' morale was low, and when Belenko made suggestions, he was only derided by the political officer. Additionally, his wife Lyudmila, unhappy with the life of a military wife, had told him she was going to file for divorce in October and move with their son, Dmitry (born 1973), back to her parents' home in Magadan. That contributed to Belenko becoming disillusioned with living in the Soviet Union.

== Defection flight ==
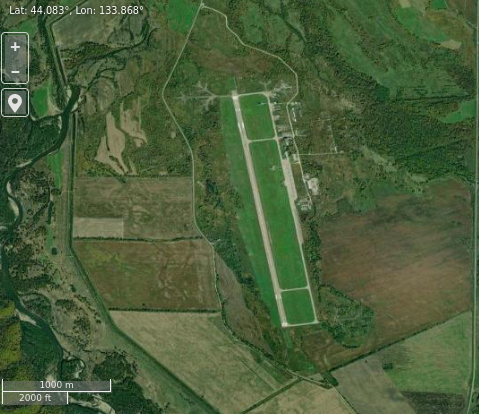
Chuguyevka Air Base

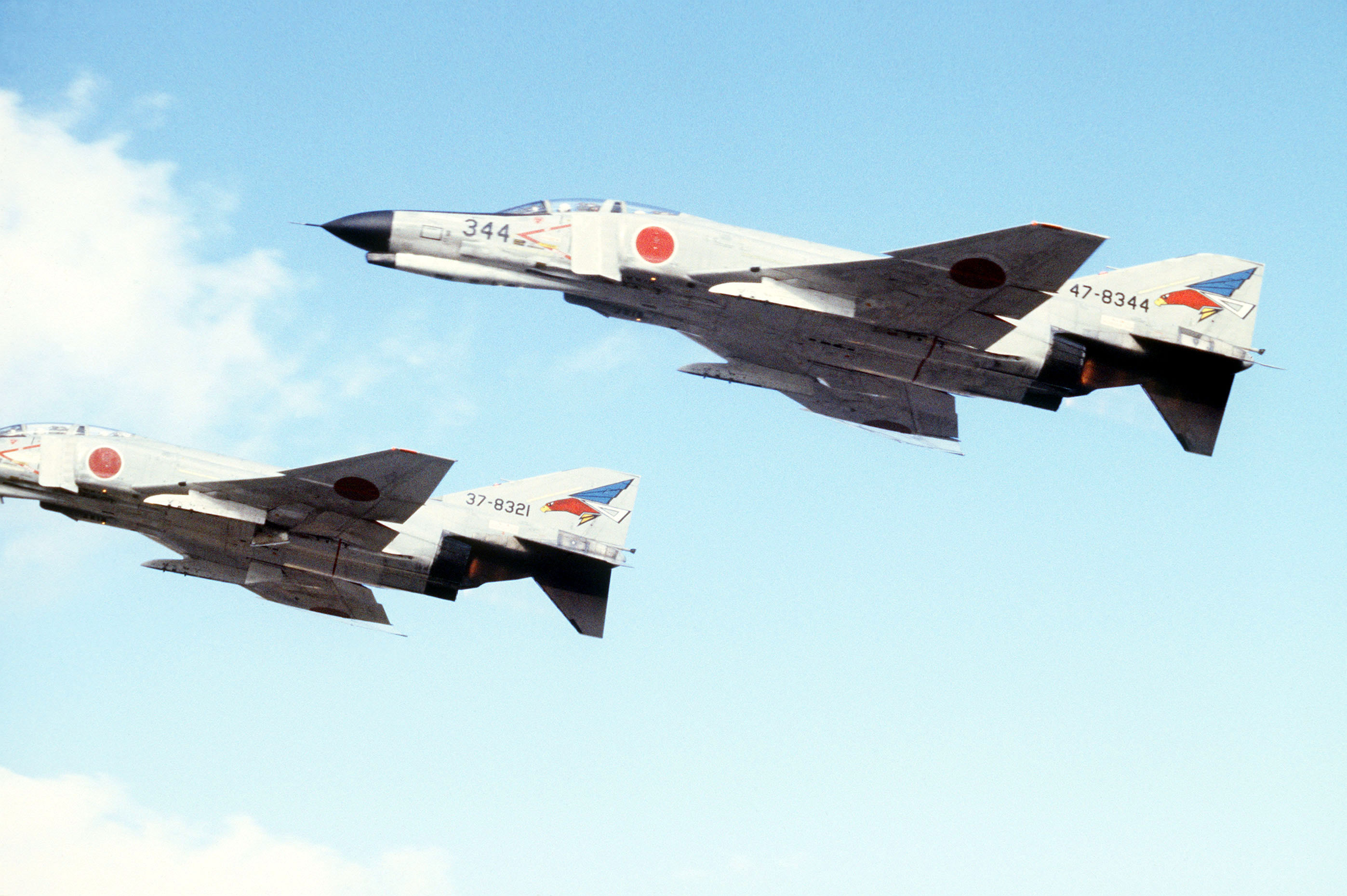
Japan Air Self Defense Force F-4EJs of 302 Squadron

On September 6, 1976, Belenko and several other pilots from his squadron of the Soviet Air Defense Force took off from Chuguyevka Air Base around 190 km (120 mi) from Vladivostok on a training flight. Belenko followed the flight plan at first, climbing before descending rapidly and heading out to sea.

At around 1:10PM. Japanese radar detected Belenko's plane and at around 1:20PM, two F-4EJ fighters of the 302nd Tactical Fighter Squadron took off from Chitose Air Base near Sapporo.

Belenko's map of Hokkaido had shown only Chitose Air Base, and he had planned to land there. He had expected to be intercepted and escorted by military aircraft to a military base, either Chitose or another one. However, the weather was very cloudy and the Japanese ground radar was not able to adequately track Belenko's aircraft. The Japanese F-4s were new aircraft and had entered JASDF service only in 1974. However, they had poor "look down shoot down" radar and were unable to locate the aircraft either.

With fuel running low and needing to land quickly, he finally located Hakodate Airport, in southern Hokkaido.

== Landing ==
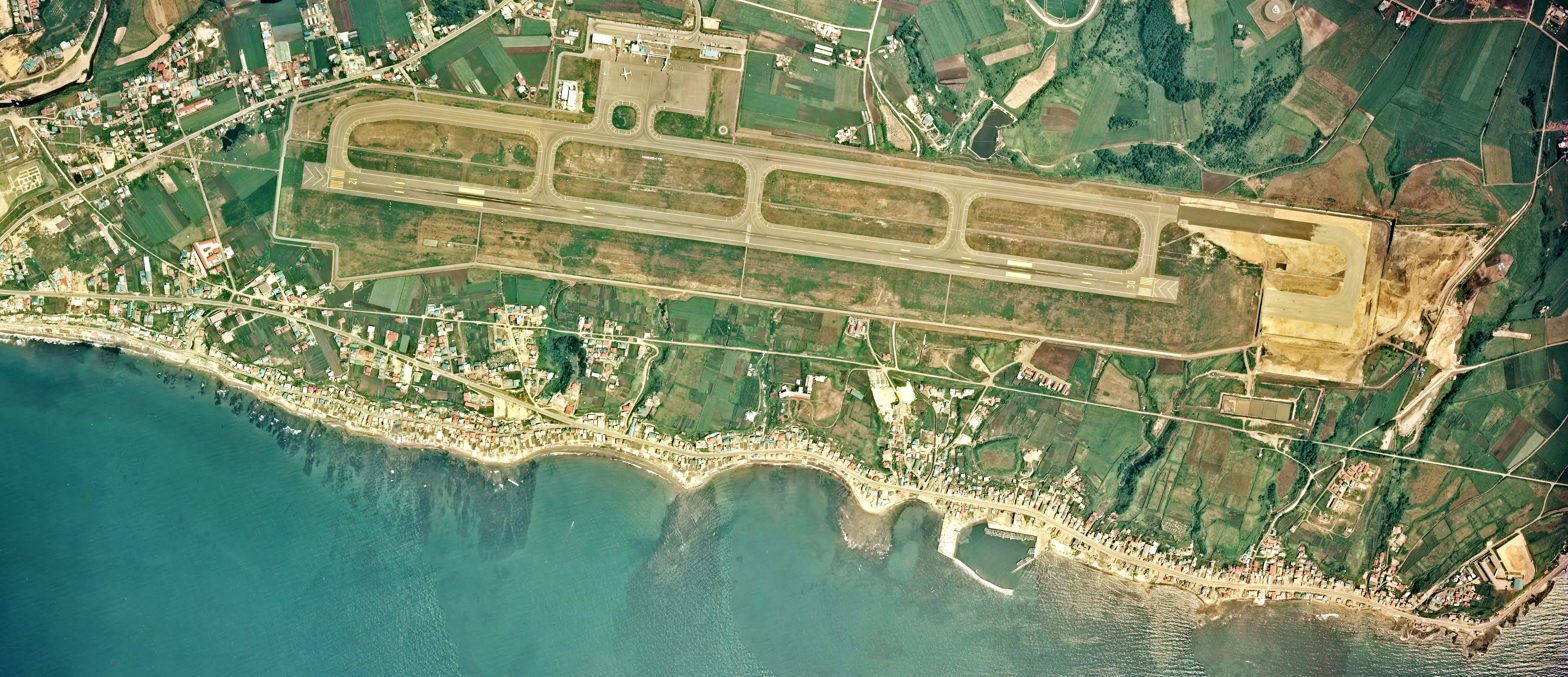
Hakodate Airport in 1976

Belenko circled Hakodate three times and landed at the airport. On landing he almost hit a Boeing 727 airliner that was taking off. Hakodate Airport was too short for his aircraft and so despite his deployment of the plane's drogue parachute, the front landing gear's tire burst and the aircraft ran 240 metres (790 ft) off the end of the runway. It finally stopped just before the localizer antenna, with approximately 30 seconds of fuel remaining.

Belenko had intended to land at a military airbase and had not planned to arrive at a civilian airport. Local people and workers began to gather and some started taking pictures. Belenko fired into the air with his service pistol.

The Hakodate Air Traffic Controller contacted the SDF but was told to call the police. The police arrived around 2:10 p.m. and closed down the airport.

== Belenko in Japan ==
Belenko was arrested by Hokkaido police for violating Japanese airspace and firearms offenses. When interviewed by the police, he requested political asylum in the US.

The Soviets requested an interview with Belenko and for him to be returned to their custody. On September 7, Belenko was moved to Tokyo, and on September 8, the US announced that it had granted him political asylum.

On September 9, a representative from the Soviet embassy met with Belenko and tried to convince him to return to the Soviet Union but was unsuccessful. After that, Belenko left Japan on a Northwest Orient Airlines flight for the US.

On September 9, the Ministry of Justice gave jurisdiction over the MiG to the Defense Agency.

The Soviet Union insisted that Belenko had lost his way and later that he had been drugged by the Japanese. Japanese fishing vessels were seized and their crews imprisoned in what was thought to be retaliation for Japan not returning Belenko and not sending the MiG back promptly.

== Emergency posture of SDF ==
The MiG's landing caused great concern in Japan. There were fears that there could be a Soviet attack or attempt to recover the aircraft by air or Soviet agents.

=== Ground Self-Defense Force ===
The 11th Division of the GSDF, based in Hakodate was preparing for an open day. After the MiG landed 200 troops deployed to Hakodate Airport with Type 61 tanks and 35mm L-90 anti-aircraft weapons along with men of the 28th Light Infantry Regiment.

=== Maritime Self-Defense Force ===
The JMSDF deployed vessels around Hokkaido. It had three vessels on the Sea of Japan side and two ships on the Pacific side.

Between September 8 and 25, the MSDF patrolled the Tsugaru Strait between Hokkaido and Honshu.

At the same time, MSDF helicopters of the Ōminato Base continually patrolled the Tsugaru Strait.

=== Air Self Defense Force ===
With multiple Soviet military aircraft bases close to Hokkaido the F-4EJ fighter aircraft of the JASDF conducted 24-hour patrols over Hokkaido in order to intercept any incoming aircraft.

== MiG moved ==
After its arrival at Hakodate Airport the MiG-25 had been covered to obscure it. Inspecting it closely at a small civilian airport was impractical and it was too large to be moved by Japanese aircraft.

On September 25, it was partly disassembled and taken from Hakodate Airport to Hyakuri Air Base north of Tokyo on a US Air Force Lockheed C-5A Galaxy cargo plane. A banner on the plane read: "Goodbye people of Hakodate, sorry for the trouble" (函館の皆さんさようなら、大変ご迷惑をかけました, Hakodate no minasan sayōnara, taihen gomeiwaku wo kakemashita).

The C-5A was escorted by F-4 Phantoms on its flight from Hokkaido to Honshu.

== Examination at Hyakuri ==
When Belenko left his base on September 6, he had brought a training manual for the aircraft, expecting that he would be demonstrating it to the US Air Force. Given the Soviet pressure to return the aircraft, Japan did not permit the US to take the aircraft or to fly it.

However, Japanese and American technicians disassembled it at Hyakuri and analysed it in detail. Eventually, it was packed up into around 40 boxes and on November 15, it was shipped from Hitachi in Ibaraki to the Soviet Union. The Soviets complained that around 20 pieces were missing.

== Aftermath ==
=== Viktor Belenko ===
Viktor Belenko moved to the US, was debriefed extensively by the CIA and US military, learned English, and gradually adapted to life in the US. The story of his life in the Soviet Union, his defection and his early time in the US was written by John Barron in the book MiG Pilot: The Final Escape of Lieutenant Belenko, published in 1980. Belenko later became a consultant to the US military and aerospace industry, a public speaker and businessman. He also married an American woman and had two children.

=== Japan ===
The Soviet government was extremely displeased with the situation and sent Japan a demand for $10 million for the damage to the plane. Japan charged the Soviets $40,000 for the damage to Hakodate Airport and shipping costs. Neither bill is known to have been paid.

Belenko's flight had been a defection and not an attack but had highlighted shortcomings in Japan's air defense system. The inability of Japanese radar to track him and of Japanese fighters to intercept him led to changes in the Japanese defense system.

The JASDF purchased Grumman E-2 Hawkeye airborne warning aircraft and several years later purchased McDonnell Douglas F-15 Eagles with better look-down radar capacities. The F-15's development had been spurred on by US fears about the MiG-25's capabilities. Japan also later updated the systems of its F-4s to have improved look-down capacities.

=== Soviet Union ===
Belenko's defection also exposed Soviet officials to the living conditions of pilots stationed at remote airbases. A committee later visited Chuguyevka Air Base, where Belenko had been stationed, and was reportedly shocked by what they found. They promptly decided to improve conditions and amenities for pilots, constructing a five-story government building, a school, a kindergarten, and other recreational facilities. As a result, the treatment of pilots in the Russian Far East region improved.

Before Belenko's defection, the MiG-25 was largely unknown outside the Soviet Union. The breach of secrecy allowed the aircraft to be exported abroad, and it was subsequently operated by Algeria, Bulgaria, India, Iraq, Libya, and Syria. Following the dissolution of the Soviet Union, the MiG-25 was also operated by its successor states of Armenia, Belarus, Georgia, Kazakhstan, Russia, Turkmenistan, and Ukraine.

The MiG-31 Foxhound was already in development at the time of Belenko's defection and had first flown in September 1975. Belenko was aware of the "Super Foxbat" and informed the US after his defection. The MiG-31 was to gradually replace the MiG-25 in Soviet and later in Russian service.

=== United States ===
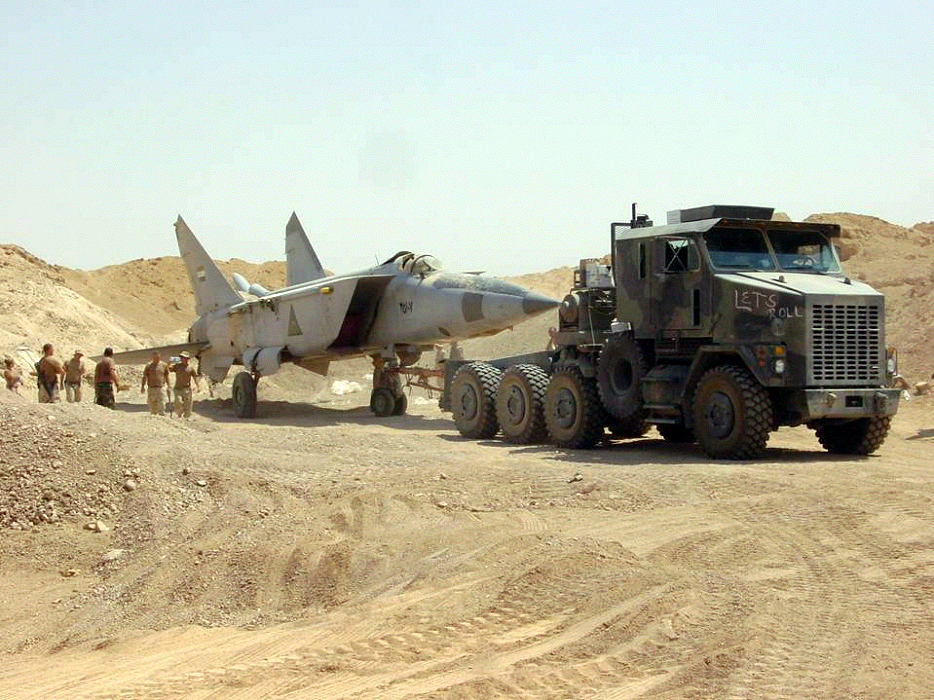
Iraqi Air Force MiG-25 captured in 2003

The US was relieved to discover that the MiG-25 was less advanced but still continued with development of the F-15, which was partly designed to counter the MiG-25. The MiG-25 was found to use nuvistors, presumably to provide its avionics with radiation hardening.

The US was unable to keep Belenko's MiG-25P in 1976, but they eventually obtained an Iraqi MiG-25 after the 2003 invasion of Iraq.

== See also ==
- Violations of Japanese airspace
