= Viktor Belenko =

Soviet pilot who defected to the West (1947–2023)

- Виктор Беленко
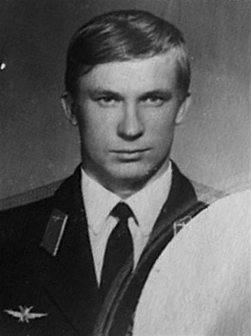
- Belenko's Soviet military identification photo; stored at the CIA Museum
- Born: February 15, 1947; Nalchik, Kabardin ASSR, Soviet Union
- Died: September 24, 2023 (aged 76); Pope County, Illinois, U.S.
- Other name: Viktor Schmidt
- Spouse(s): Lyudmila Petrovna (m. 1971; sep. 1976) Coral Garaas (divorced)
- Children: 3
- Military career
- Allegiance: Soviet Union
- Branch: Soviet Air Defence Forces
- Service years: 1967–1976
- Rank: Lieutenant
- Units: 11th Air Army; 513th Fighter Regiment
- Known for: Defecting to the U.S. with MiG-25 in 1976

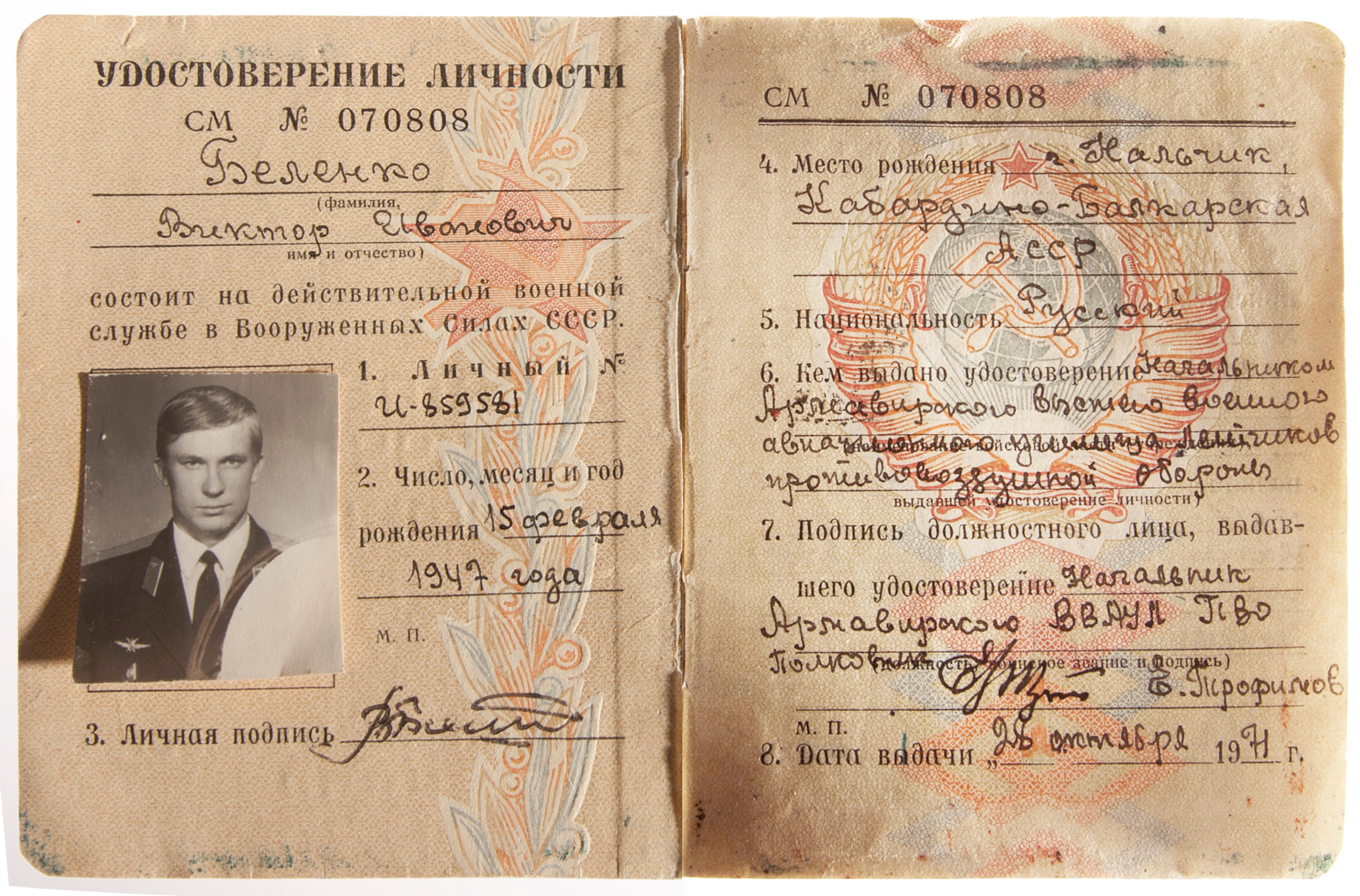
Viktor Belenko's military ID

Viktor Ivanovich Belenko (Russian: Виктор Иванович Беленко; February 15, 1947 – September 24, 2023) was a Soviet-born American aerospace engineer and pilot who defected in 1976 to the West while flying his MiG-25 "Foxbat" jet interceptor and landed in Hakodate, Japan. George H. W. Bush, the Director of Central Intelligence at the time, called the opportunity to examine the plane up close an "intelligence bonanza" for the West. Belenko later became a U.S. aerospace engineer.

== Early life and defection ==
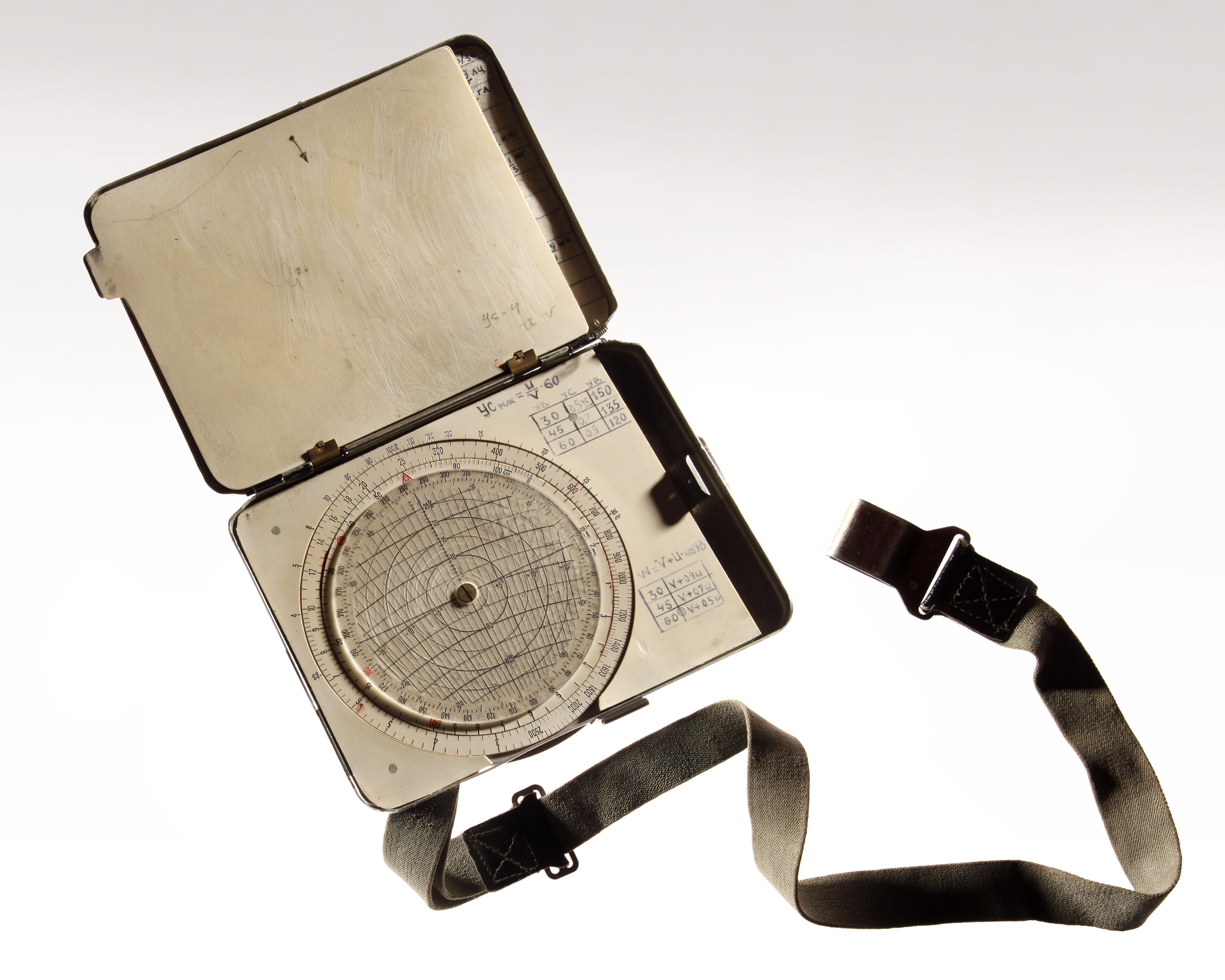
Belenko's knee pad notebook with flight data

Belenko was born in Nalchik, Russian SFSR, in a Russian family (his passport states his ethnicity as Russian). Lieutenant Belenko was a pilot with the 513th Fighter Regiment, 11th Air Army, Soviet Air Defence Forces based in Chuguyevka, Primorsky Krai. On September 6, 1976, he successfully defected to the West by flying his MiG-25 jet fighter to Hakodate Airport in Hokkaido, Japan. He was married to Lyudmila Petrovna and they had a son, Dmitry (born in January 1973), but at the time of his defection, he was going through a marital crisis, when his wife, hailing from a wealthy family and not liking being a military wife, had told him she was intending to file for divorce and move with their son to her parents' home in Magadan.

This was the first time that Western military intelligence were able to get a close look at the aircraft and its specifications, and many secrets and surprises were revealed. His defection caused significant damage to the Soviet Air Force. Belenko was granted asylum by U.S. President Gerald Ford, and a trust fund was set up for him, which granted him a very comfortable living in later years. The US government debriefed him for five months after his defection and employed him as a consultant for several years thereafter. Belenko had brought with him the pilot's manual for the MiG-25 since he expected to assist US pilots in evaluating and testing the aircraft.

Belenko was not the only pilot to have defected from the Soviet Union in this way or even the first to defect from a Soviet-bloc country. He might have been aware of the US government's policy of awarding large cash prizes to defecting pilots of communist countries. In March and May 1953, two Polish Air Force pilots Lieutenant Franciszek Jarecki and Lieutenant Zdzisław Jaźwiński flew MiG-15s to Denmark. Later in 1953, North Korean pilot No Kum Sok flew his MiG-15 to a US air base in South Korea; the MiG is in the permanent collection of the National Museum of the U.S. Air Force, displayed in its original owner markings. Later, Soviet Captain Aleksandr Zuyev flew his MiG-29 to Trabzon, Turkey, on May 20, 1989. That MiG-29 was promptly returned to the Soviets.

== Aftermath ==
The MiG-25's arrival in Japan was a windfall for Western military planners. The Japanese government had originally allowed the United States to examine the plane and to conduct ground tests of the radar and engines only; however, it subsequently allowed the US to dismantle the plane to examine it extensively. The plane was moved by a US Air Force C-5 Galaxy cargo aircraft from Hakodate to Hyakuri Air Base on September 25, and by then, experts had determined that the plane was an interceptor, not a fighter-bomber, which was a welcome reassurance for Japanese defense planners.

On October 2, 1976, the Japanese government announced that it would ship the aircraft back to the USSR in crates from the port of Hitachi and billed the Soviets US$40,000 for crating services and airfield damage at Hakodate. The Soviets responded with a request to return the plane via their own Antonov An-22 aircraft after a rigorous inspection of the crates. The Japanese government refused, and the Soviets finally submitted to the Japanese terms on October 22, 1976. The aircraft was moved from Hyakuri to the port of Hitachi on November 11, 1976, on a convoy of trailers. It left in 30 crates aboard the Soviet cargo ship Taigonos on November 15, 1976, and arrived about three days later in Vladivostok. A team of Soviet technicians had been allowed to view subassemblies at Hitachi, and upon finding 20 missing parts, one being film of the flight to Hakodate, the Soviets attempted to charge Japan US $10 million. Neither the Japanese nor the Soviet bill is known to have been paid.

A senior diplomat described the Soviet position as "sulky about the whole affair." The CIA concluded at the time that "both countries seem anxious to put the problem behind them" and speculated that the Soviets were reluctant to cancel a series of upcoming diplomatic visits because "some useful business is likely to be transacted, and because the USSR, with its political standing in Tokyo so low, can ill-afford setbacks in Soviet–Japanese economic cooperation."

== Life in the United States ==
Belenko started a new life in the United States. In 1980, the US Congress enacted S. 2961, authorizing citizenship for him, which was signed into law by President Jimmy Carter on October 14, 1980, as Private Law 96-62. Eager to avoid attention, and reprisal from the Soviet Union, he took the surname Schmidt and moved around often, mostly living in small towns across the Midwest. He worked as a consultant to aerospace companies and government agencies, and married a music teacher from North Dakota, Coral Garaas. They had two sons before divorcing.

The Soviet Union repeatedly spread false stories about Belenko being killed in a car accident, returning to Russia, being arrested and executed, or otherwise brought to justice. Russian journalists claimed that Belenko allegedly also had a son from his first marriage, never divorced his first wife, and never provided child support to her after his defection, but Belenko denied all of these claims. The journalists also claimed that his Soviet wife appealed for his return after his defection.

Belenko co-wrote a 1980 autobiography, MiG Pilot: The Final Escape of Lieutenant Belenko with Reader's Digest writer John Barron, which confirmed that he had a wife and son in the USSR, although Belenko had previously told his younger son that this was Soviet propaganda.

Belenko almost never appeared in interviews during his life in the United States. He feared for his life until the day he died. However, in a brief and informal bar interview in 2000, he said that he was happy in the United States, remarking, "[Americans] have tolerance regarding other people's opinion. In certain cultures, if you do not accept the mainstream, you would be booted out or might disappear. Here we have people—you know, who hug trees, and people who want to cut them down—and they live side by side!" In this interview he also claimed that he visited Moscow but did not provide any evidence of his trip.

Viktor Belenko died in a nursing home in the small town of Red Bud, Illinois, on September 24, 2023, at the age of 76. He was survived by two sons and four grandchildren, as well as a son from his previous marriage. However, journalists learned about his death only at the end of November. One of his sons told the newspaper that his father had died after a short illness. There was no memorial service.

== See also ==
- Aleksandr Zuyev (pilot)
- List of Cold War pilot defections
- List of Soviet and Eastern Bloc defectors
