= Bill Christine =

American sportswriter (1938–2025)

- Born: August 5, 1938; Illinois, U.S.
- Died: August 25, 2025 (aged 87); Hermosa Beach, California, U.S.
- Education: Southern Illinois University Carbondale
- Occupations: Journalist, author, publicist
- Employers: Southern Illinoisan (1957–1963); East St. Louis Journal (1963–1965); The Baltimore News American (1965–1968); The Louisville Times (1968–1969); The Pittsburgh Press (1969–1971); Chicago Daily News (1972–1973); Pittsburgh Post-Gazette (1973–1975); Commodore Downs (1976–1977); National Thoroughbred Racing Association(1978–1982); Los Angeles Times (1982–2005)
- Awards: Eclipse Award, Outstanding Newspaper Writing (1984); David F. Woods Memorial Award (1991, 1992)

Willard M. Christine Jr. (August 5, 1938 – August 25, 2025) was an American sportswriter, author and publicist, dealing primarily with baseball and horse racing, who served briefly as sports editor of the Pittsburgh Post-Gazette, and, for roughly the final half of his career, as a nationally syndicated columnist for the Los Angeles Times.

== Early life and career ==
Christine was born in Illinois on August 5, 1938, to Willard M. Christine and Bernice J. Walsh. He graduated from Assumption High School in 1956, and later from Southern Illinois University Carbondale. While attending SIUC, he also reported on sports for the Southern Illinoisan.

Christine died from acute myeloid leukemia in Hermosa Beach, California, on August 25, 2025, at the age of 87.

== Works ==
=== Books ===
- "Numero Uno" Roberto! (1973)
- Bill Hartack : the Bittersweet Life of a Hall of Fame Jockey (2016)
- They Left Their Hearts in San Francisco : The Lives of Songwriters George Cory and Douglass Cross (2017)

=== Selected articles ===
- "Bucs Deck Cards; Clemente's Catch Saves Veale's Win". The Pittsburgh Press. September 12, 1969. p .29
- "The Sports Beat: Two Bits, Please; The Early Bird; Who's Chi Chi". The Pittsburgh Press. April 28, 1970. p. 41
- "National League Gallery of Stars". Baseball 1972 Yearbook. March 1972. pp. 68–78
- "Our Man in Florida Chalks One Up". The Pittsburgh Press. April 28, 1971. p. 29
- "Don Wilson Was Something Special". Pittsburgh Post-Gazette. January 21, 1975. p. 18; reprinted as "Don Wilson: The End Came Too Soon". Baseball Digest. April 1975.
- "As I See It". Sports Illustrated. March 29, 1976. p. 73
- "An Official Scorer Who Has Lived to Tell About It". The New York Times. July 22, 1979. p. S2; reprinted as "Scorers Can't Please Everyone". Tallahassee Democrat. July 21, 1979. p. 46
- "An Official Scorer Who Has Lived to Tell About It". The New York Times. July 22, 1979. p. S2; reprinted as "Scorers Can't Please Everyone". Tallahassee Democrat. July 21, 1979. p. 46* "Ride 'Em, Cowboy Jack, Right to Winner's Circle". Best Sports Stories 1983. St. Louis, MO: The Sporting News Publishing Company. 1983. pp. 147–151
- "'Secretariat's' Loss: rival Angle Light". Los Angeles Times. October 3, 2010. p. 24
