= List of Cold War pilot defections =

During the Cold War, a number of pilots from various nations (Eastern Bloc, Western Bloc, and non-aligned) defected with their aircraft to other countries.

== Afghanistan ==
- On November 24, 1960, Royal Afghan Air Force pilot Abdus Samad Fazli defected by flying his J-3 Cub across the border to Pakistan.
- On February 26, 1981, Afghan Air Force pilot Captain Jamal ud Din defected with his crew to Pakistan on board a Mi-8T helicopter numbered 285, during post-maintenance flight test from Kandahar Air Base.
- On November 20, 1983, Captain Mohammed Nabi Korinzay defected to Pakistan with his Su-7BM fighter-bomber. The aircraft broke up during a crash landing on the runway at Dalbandin.
- On July 16, 1984, an Afghan Mi-25 helicopter defected and landed in Miranshah.
- On September 22, 1984, Colonel Haji Fakir, flying an An-26 defected from Afghanistan to Miranshah Air Base, Pakistan.
- On June 28, 1985, the crews of two Mi-24 Hind-Ds defected from Afghanistan to Pakistan. The helicopters were later transferred to the United States for evaluation, they were later returned and one of them is now at display in Khalid Aviation Base Quetta (Pakistan).
- On 23 October 1986, an Afghan Mig 21, piloted by Lt. Mohammed Daoud defected to Pakistan, landing at Kohat Air Base.
- On 3 October 1987, two Afghan Mil Mi-4 helicopters defected to Pakistan, landing in Chitral. Although the helicopters were returned to Afghanistan, the crews were granted political asylum.
- On December 8, 1988, Captain Asadullah flying a MiG-21 defected from Afghanistan to Miranshah Airfield, Pakistan.
- On July 3, 1989, Captain Mohammed Hamid flying a Mi-25 defected from Afghanistan to Kica Air Base, Pakistan.
- On July 6, 1989, Afghan Air Force Captain Jan Pahrand defected to Pakistan with his Su-22M-4K fighter-bomber.

== Algeria ==
- On June 17, 1998, Captain Alili Messaoud flew his Mi-8 helicopter from Blida Air Force Base, southwest of Algiers, first to Formentera island and then to Ibiza, Spain, getting away from the Algerian Civil War (1992–2002). The helicopter was subsequently returned to Algeria while the pilot asked for political asylum that was not granted because of Algerian pressures, however he was granted a resident visa each year continuing to the present.

== China ==
A number of defections occurred from the People's Republic of China, with most of its pilots defecting to the Republic of China (Taiwan). These include:

- On January 12, 1960, the first PLA defection occurred. Yang Decai, a PLANAF pilot from the 4th Fighter Division flew a Mikoyan-Gurevich MiG-15 with serial number 6501 from Luqiao air base to Yilan County, Taiwan. However, Yang was killed when his aircraft crashed on landing.
- On September 15, 1961, PLAAF pilots Shao Xiyan and Gao Youzong flew an Antonov An-2 from Ji'ao county, Shandong to Jeju-do and reached Taiwan on October 7, 1961. Both pilots were personally interviewed by Chiang Kai-shek and rewarded 500 taels (approximately 25 kg) of gold. Both pilots served in the Republic of China Air Force and retired with ranks of colonel, and Shao eventually emigrated to the United States.
- On March 3, 1962, Liu Chengsi, a PLANAF pilot of the 8th squadron of the 3rd wing of the 16th regiment flew a Mikoyan-Gurevich MiG-15 from Luqiao air base in Zhejiang to Taoyuan County, Taiwan (now Taoyuan City). Liu was rewarded 1,000 taels (approximately 50 kg) of gold, and the position of deputy director of a Republic of China Air Force radio station. He was honorably discharged with a rank of colonel.

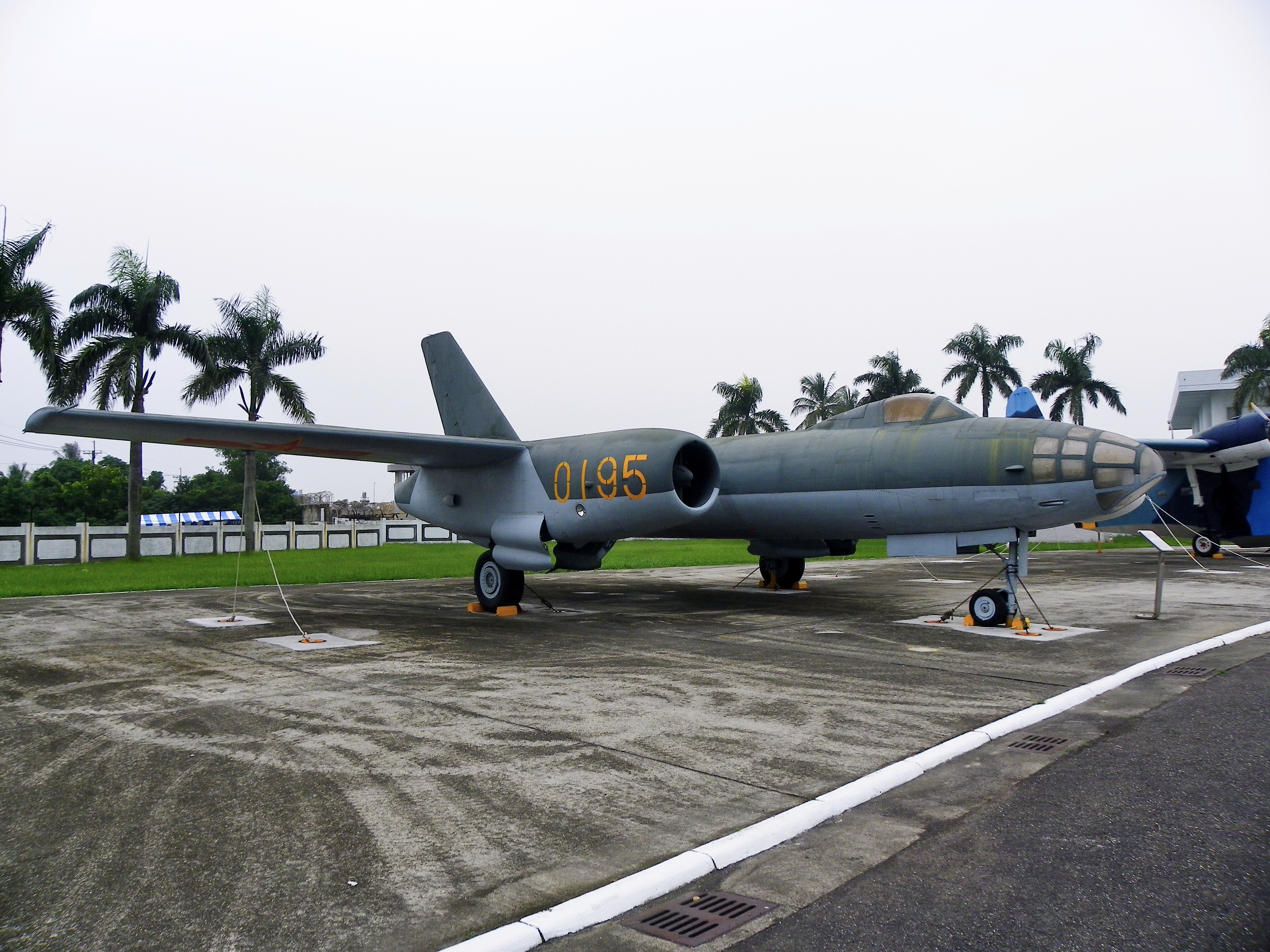
Li Xianbin's Il-28 on display at the Republic of China Air Force Museum in 2011

- On November 11, 1965, Li Xianbin, a PLAAF captain of Ilyushin Il-28 of the 8th division flew his bomber numbered 0195 from Jianqiao air base in Hangzhou to Taoyuan County, Taiwan (now Taoyuan City); this was the first fully operational Il-28 in western hands. The radio operator / tail gunner Lian Baosheng was found dead at the scene and the navigator Li Caiwang was captured alive after a suicide attempt. Both survivors were honored and rewarded positions in the Republic of China Air Force. Li Xianbin was rewarded 2,000 taels (approximately 100 kg) of gold, while Li Caiwang was rewarded 1,000 taels (approximately 50 kg) of gold. Since Lian Baosheng was dead, his reward of 1,000 taels (approximately 50 kg) of gold was divided evenly among Li Xianbin and Li Caiwang.
  - Li Xianbin made headlines in Taiwan years later when he demanded all of the rewards because of what he claimed was his unfair treatment by Taiwan. Li Xianbin claimed that he was the sole defector, and the other two were actually captured due to his defection, a fact that was later agreed by both Taiwan and the navigator Li Caiwang himself. Li Xianbin claimed that for the purpose of political propaganda, all the crew were honored as defectors, which was far from the truth, but he was not successful in getting all of the gold reward. After he was honorably discharged as colonel from the Republic of China Air Force, Li Xianbin obtained Canadian residency. He made headlines again in 1992 when he returned to China via Canada after he learned that his mother was about to die. After his return to Qingdao in October 1992, he was eventually arrested by the local Public Security Bureau when he was on his way to the airport for his return trip to Canada. Li Xianbin was first sentenced to 15 years but this was later reduced to 10, and the sentence was further reduced drastically because it was discovered that he had stomach cancer that was in its terminal stage. He was released early and died shortly after his release. Many elements of the Chinese democracy movement first accused the Chinese government of inhumanity for not allowing Li Xianbin to go back to China to visit his dying mother, and then accused the Chinese government of trying to repatriate him to either Taiwan or Canada because the regime did not want to foot the bill for his treatment, since he did not have his assets transferred to China.
  - Li Caiwang, the navigator of the Il-28, was seriously wounded by Li Xianbin during the latter's defection and was forced to accept his fate after he survived his suicide attempt. During his stay in the hospital for the gunshot he received in the shoulder, the nurse who took care of him fell in love with him and told him that she was also responsible to perform surveillance on him, under the order of the Republic of China government. The two eventually married and moved into the nurse's home, but were still under constant surveillance: a major general of the Republic of China military had a son who was going to a school near the couple's home, so he rented a room at their residence for years to keep Li Caiwang under surveillance. Although the major general and his son finally moved out, Li Caiwang had no intention of staying in Taiwan, and since the wife's sister was married to an American, Li Caiwang and his wife immigrated to the United States in 1972 after his honorable discharge from the Republic of China Air Force as a colonel. The couple became naturalized citizens of the United States in 1979. In 1982, Chinese diplomats contacted Li Caiwang in the United States and got his side of the story, and after a prolonged investigation, the Chinese government rehabilitated him in 1984. After several visits to China in the 1990s, Li Caiwang eventually resettled in China in 1998.
- On July 7, 1977, Fan Yuanye, a PLAAF pilot flew his Shenyang J-6 numbered 3171 from Jinjiang to an air base in Tainan, and was rewarded a rank of lieutenant colonel in the Republic of China Air Force. After his honorable discharge from the Republic of China Air Force, Fan joined an investment firm with his money and obtained American green card, but he stayed primarily in Taiwan to handle his investments.
- On April 15, 1979, Yan Wenchang, a distinguished PLAAF pilot who earned numerous awards for his excellent performance in support of the Sino-Vietnamese War, was extremely bitter after learning that the promotion for the deputy squadron commissar was given to somebody else instead of him. Yan felt he was the better candidate and should get the promotion and he was under appreciated, and as a result, he decided to defect to Vietnam after learning that the opportunity would be gone because his unit would soon be redeployed to Hunan, and the only thing he left was a note to his wife that read:I'll be gone, good-bye forever!'. However, Vietnam did not react at all to his attempts for contacts after his Shenyang J-6 entered Vietnam from Guangxi, and as result, Yan was killed after directly crashing into a 1,000 metre high mountains cliff approximately 80 km south of Haiphong. The Chinese Ministry of Foreign Affairs told Vietnam the next day that the incident was a navigational error and asked for the return of the remains of the pilot and the jet, but Vietnam refused, and instead, asked Soviet investigators to inspect the wreckage. KGB aviation experts discovered that the avionics of Yan's J-6 was extremely rudimentary even by Soviet standard, and was indeed lacking any effective navigational avionics. Furthermore, the communication on the J-6 was not encrypted, and it could be intercepted by advanced civilian radios on the market. Since Yan was a regular pilot that patrolled the airspace within the 10 km of the Sino-Vietnamese border (sometimes as frequent as 4 times a day), his defection was not detected until his crash.
- On August 7, 1983, Sun Tianqin, a former PLANAF pilot who had just transferred to PLAAF several months ago to become a test pilot, flew a J-7II numbered 045 from Dalian to Seoul Air Base in South Korea. Sun was rewarded a rank of colonel in the Republic of China Air Force and 7,000 taels (approximately 350 kg) of gold, the highest ever recorded. In January 1985, Sun married Li Tianhui, a Chinese musician who also defected to Taiwan, and the pair eventually immigrated to Canada after Sun's honorable discharge from the Republic of China Air Force.
- On November 14, 1983, Wang Xuecheng, a 25-year-old PLANAF squadron commander of the 2nd wing of the 18th regiment of the 6th division flew a Shenyang J-5 numbered 83065 from Daishan, Zhejiang to Taiwan, and under the escort of two F-5E's, successfully landed at Chiang Kai-shek International Airport. Wang was rewarded a rank of major in Republic of China Air Force and 3,000 taels (approximately 150 kg) of gold. After a divorce, Wang married a local Taiwanese woman and fathered two daughters and a son. Wang still talks to his family members in Henan via telephone, and refuses to immigrate abroad like most other Chinese defectors did.
- On August 25, 1985, a PLAAF deputy wing commander Xiao Tianrun, flew an Ilyushin Il-28 from Ji'ao county, Shandong to Iri (now Iksan), and during emergency landing in the field, the navigator Sun Wuchun was killed, along with a South Korean citizen on the ground. The radio operator / tail gunner Liu Shuyi refused to defect and South Korea returned him to China along with the ashes of Sun Wuchun. On September 20, 1985, Xiao reached Taiwan and was awarded 3,000 taels (approximately 150 kg) of gold and a rank of colonel in the Republic of China Air Force. Xiao Tianrun left two copies of his declaration against communism in China and requested one of the copies to be sent to Deng Xiaoping. Xiao was personally interviewed by Chiang Ching-kuo and appeared on the Republic of China national day celebration parade in October of the same year. Xiao later married Taiwanese TV reporter Chang Te-fung, who helped Xiao greatly in his investment in Taiwanese stock market, but the pair were eventually divorced.
- On February 21, 1986, Chen Baozhong, 26, a squadron commander of the 3rd wing of the PLAAF 4th aerial reconnaissance regiment flew a reconnaissance version of Shenyang J-6 numbered 3283 from Shenyang airport to Suwon Air Base, South Korea, abandoning a training exercise. Chen reached Taiwan on April 30, 1986, and was awarded 5,000 taels (approximately 250 kg) of gold. Little is known about Chen after his honorable discharge from the Republic of China Air Force.
- On October 24, 1986, PLAAF pilot Zheng Caitian flew his Shenyang J-6 from Yantai to Seoul Air Base and when he reached Taiwan, he was awarded 5,000 taels (approximately 250 kg) of gold. Among the Chinese defecting pilots, Zheng has had the harshest life of all, because he invested in an electronic factory that went bankrupt, and lost all of his money in his subsequent investments.
- On November 19, 1987, Liu Zhiyuan, a squadron commander of PLAAF 49th division flew his Shenyang J-6 numbered 40208 from Longxi airport, Zhangzhou to Ching Chuan Kang Air Base in Taichung, Taiwan and was awarded 5,000 taels (approximately 250 kg) of gold. Liu invested heavily in the Taiwanese stock market and his assets (not including the gold rewarded to him) were once more than 10 million New Taiwan dollars (approximately 400,000 United States dollars).
- On September 6, 1989, Jiang Wenhao, a 23-year-old PLAAF lieutenant of the 2nd wing of the 145th regiment of the 49th division flew a Shenyang J-6 numbered 40307 from Longxi airport, Zhangzhou, Fujian to Kinmen Shang Yi Airport. Jiang was interviewed by the then chief-of-general-staff of Taiwanese armed forces, Hau Pei-tsun and awarded a rank of lieutenant in the Republic of China Air Force. Jiang's financial reward, however, was reduced to 2,000 taels (approximately 100 kg) of gold from the original 5,000 taels (approximately 250 kg), because due to the reduction of tensions with China during the 1980s, Taiwan had greatly reduced the amount on September 15, 1988, in response to similar Chinese action four days earlier. (China had completely abolished any financial rewards to any Taiwanese defectors). Jiang was soon honorably discharged from the Republic of China Air Force after being promoted to captain. Jiang became a famed underwater photographer and won several awards, and he also worked as a diving instructor.
- On August 25, 1990, Wang Baoyu, a squadron commander of the 62 Air Regiment of the 21st PLAAF Air Division, defected to former USSR by flying his Shenyang J-6 to Vladivostok after taking off from Jiaohe military airport in Mudanjiang (not to be confused by the city of Jiaohe and the civilian Mudanjiang Airport at Mudangjiang). A week later, he was turned over to China along with the aircraft (according to the Soviet eyewitness of the extradition procedure, Wang was severely beaten by Chinese escort detail officers as soon as they got him from the Soviets,) and Wang Baoyu was subsequently sentenced to death, although his sentence was commuted to life in prison. The Chinese democracy movement condemned the Soviet act of returning the pilot back to China. Several high-ranking Soviet Air Defense commanders lost their jobs as a result of this defection, because Wang Baoyu was not detected until he had landed.

Note: Rewards paid in taels have been converted to mass at a rate of 50 grams (1.6 ozt) per "new market tael".

== Cuba ==
- On 4 September 1962, a Cuban pilot-instructor José Díaz Vásquez defected with a Zlin 326 Master-Trainer and landed at Key West, US. His trainee, Edel Ramírez Santos asked to return home.
- On March 20, 1964, a Mil Mi-4 was hijacked by crew members Guillermo Santos and Andrés Izaguirre who shot dead the commander of the helicopter, José García, and changed the course of the flight in the direction of Naval Air Station Key West, where they ultimately landed.
- On 5 October 1969, a Cuban pilot, Lieut. Eduardo Guerra Jiménez defected with his MiG-17 to Homestead Air Force Base of Miami. The plane was returned to the Cubans. Separately on June 12, 1979, ten years later, the same pilot hijacked Delta Air Lines Flight 1061 back to Havana.
- On May 28, 1987, Cuban Brigadier General Rafael Del Pino Díaz defected to the United States in a Cessna 402 airplane of Aerocaribbean, with his third wife, his daughter, and his son Ramsés, an ex-MiG-23 pilot. Del Pino Díaz remains the highest-ranking Cuban defector.
- On March 20, 1991, Cuban Major Orestes Lorenzo Pérez defected in his MiG-23BN to Naval Air Station Key West, Florida on a training mission of the Cuban Air Force. The plane was returned to the Cuban Air Force. On December 19, 1992, he returned to Cuba in a small, twin-engined 1961 Cessna 310, landing on the coastal highway of El Mamey beach in Varadero, Matanzas Province, 93 miles (149.6 km.), from Havana at the agreed time. His wife María Victoria (34), and their two sons Reyneil (11), and Alejandro (6), were already waiting on his order delivered through two Mexican women as messengers a few days before. Orestes Lorenzo Pérez picked up his family and managed a successful safe return to Marathon, Florida.

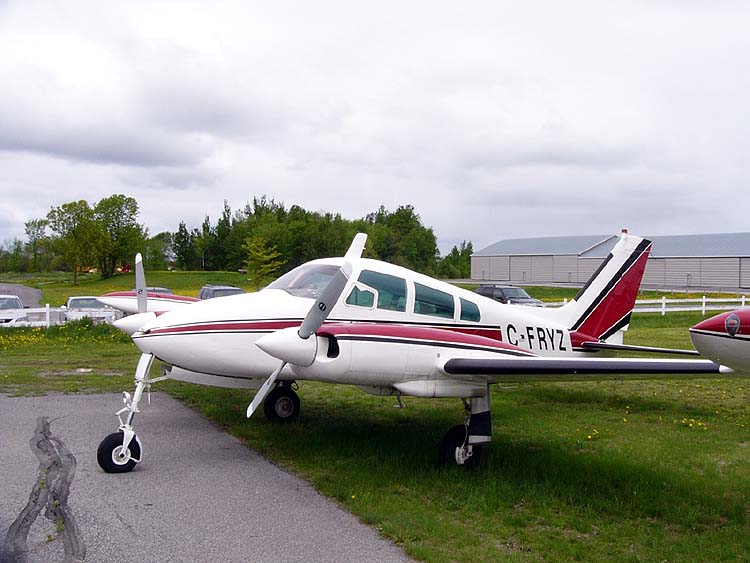
A Cessna 310 similar to the one used by Major Orestes Lorenzo to rescue his family in Cuba in 1992.

- On September 17, 1993, Cuban Captain Enio Ravelo Rodríguez, defected in his MiG-21 to Naval Air Station Key West, Florida.
- On September 23, 1993, Capt. Leónidas Basulto Serrano defected with his MiG-23 fighter to the U.S. naval base at Guantánamo Bay.

== Czechoslovakia ==
- In 1953, Mira Slovak, a pilot for Czechoslovak Airlines, was flying a regularly scheduled flight from Prague to Brno. While en route, he overpowered the co-pilot, locked the cockpit door and dove the plane to below 1,000 feet. He flew the plane to Frankfurt, where he requested and received asylum. He later went to the United States, where he flew various aircraft, raced boats, and was a pilot for Continental Airlines.
- In 1971, stunt pilot Ladislav Bezák – a winner of the FAI World Aerobatic Championships in 1960 – defected by flying to West Germany. He brought his wife and four sons along in a Zlin 226 that took off in Prague and landed in Nuremberg, where all six were awarded political asylum by West Germany.

== Dominican Republic ==
- In April 1959, Captain Juan de Dios Ventura Simó defected from the Dominican Air Force in a de Havilland Vampire jet. He first flew to Puerto Rico in order to ask for political asylum in the United States, but soon left the country to join a group of Dominican exiles in Venezuela. In June 1959, they organized a Cuban-backed guerrilla campaign against Rafael Trujillo in the Dominican Republic, but were quickly overwhelmed by Trujillo's superior military force. Ventura Simó, one of the few survivors, was captured and tortured by Trujillo's men, who organized a disinformation campaign against the opposition by claiming that Ventura Simó was not a real defector but a government spy who had led the rebels to their ruin. Once Ventura Simó was no longer useful, he was killed in prison and put on a plane which crashed at sea in order to frame the death as an aviation accident.

== Egypt ==
- On January 19, 1964, Egyptian Air Force pilot Mahmud Abbas Hilmi defected from El-Arish Air Base to Hatzor Air Base in Israel in his Yakovlev Yak-11 trainer. He asked for sanctuary in Israel and later went to Argentina, where he surrendered himself to the Egyptian Embassy in Buenos Aires. He was flown back to Egypt, court-martialed, and sentenced to death. He was executed in 1966.

== Ethiopia ==
- In 1976, two Ethiopian pilots defected to Sudan by flying their Northrop F-5A fighters to Kassala; the jets were returned to Ethiopia.
- In 1977, Ethiopian Air Force pilot Major Afeworki Mekonnen defected to Somalia with his English Electric Canberra bomber. The incident took place during the Ogaden War.
- Throughout the 1980s and early 90s (up to 1991), several Ethiopian pilots defected with their planes to Sudan and Yemen.
- On 26 May 1991, the pilots of seven Mi-8s, an L-39, two An-12s, three MiG-23s, three Mi-24s and three Mi-35s defected from Ethiopia to Djibouti after the fall of the Mengistu government. The aircraft were all returned to Ethiopia on August 8.

== East Germany ==
- On March 7, 1969, East German Air Force JG-1 pilot Hauptmann Gerhard Scharnetzki flew from Cottbus Air Base to Rønne Airport on Danish Bornholm Island in a Yak-18A trainer plane numbered 11.

== West Germany ==
- On April 1, 1971, West German Army Aviation cadet-pilot Corporal Hans-Dieter Reinkensmeier defected in a small Cessna 172 to East Germany and asked for political asylum.

== Greece ==
- On 11 September 1970 A Greek Air Force C-47 crossed into Soviet airspace in the area of Sevastopol in order to defect. The pilot of a Su-15 flew up alongside and rocked his wings, signaling "follow me". The C-47 complied and landed at Bel'bek airbase. The Greek pilot, Captain Mikhalis Maniatakis, had stolen the aircraft from Chania airbase on Crete to flee from junta-controlled Greece. Maniatakis requested political asylum in the USSR.
- On 25 November 1973 A Greek Air Force Lieutenant-Colonel Dimitrios Zelios landed at Brindisi Airport in southwest Italy and asked for political asylum.

== Hungary ==
- In August 1969 a Hungarian Air Force pilot, Maj. József Bíró defected with his MiG-15 from Taszár Air Base, Hungary, to Udine, Italy. The military tribunal stripped his rank, and sentenced to death in absentia for high treason.
- On April 7. 1970 a Hungarian Air Force pilot, 1st Lt. Sándor Zoboki defected with his MiG-15 (serial number 907) from Taszár Air Base, Hungary, to Udine, Italy. In the same year the military tribunal stripped his rank, and sentenced to death in absentia for high treason.

== Israel ==
- On 13 July 1990, at 4:30 a.m., 33-year-old Captain Haggai Mori, set out from Sde Dov Airport without permission with a Dornier Do 28 plane. According to Arab sources, the plane was met by Syrian Air Force fighter planes and driven off from Syrian airspace after an attempted crossing into Syria. According to witness reports, the plane circled above various locations in Israel, including Mori's home in Haifa. The plane later crashed in the Golan Heights. It is believed that Mori deliberately crashed his plane in a suicide. Israeli sources regarding the incident claim it was suicide attempt alone and not a defection.

== Iran ==
- On 16 October 1982, Iranian defector Keyhan Jahanfakhr, a commercial airline pilot, asked for political asylum after landing his Iran Air Boeing 727 for a stopover in Austria.
- On 10 July 1983, Iranian defector Captain Iraj Fazeli landed a US-made F-5E Tiger II jet at an airport in Van, one of Turkey's easternmost provinces bordering Iran. The aircraft belonged to TFB.2 at Tabriz.
- In early 1984, Iranian defectors flew an F-5E to Saudi Arabia (the pilot returned to Iran several years later). In both of these cases, the jets were back in Iran a few weeks later.
- On 30 August 1984, Iranian pilot Captain Rahman Nageeb defected in his F-4E Phantom II serial 3–6552 to Iraq, and his RIO became a POW who was later released with other prisoners.
- On 21 July 1985, Iranian pilot Mehdi Babaie and two airmen flew their US-made Boeing CH-47 Chinook helicopter serial 5–4089 to Iraq.
- On 31 August 1986 an Iranian top-line F-14A Tomcat fighter armed with at least one AIM-54A landed in Iraq. An Iraqi military spokesman identified the pilot and weapon systems officer (WSO) as Major Ahmed Murad Talibi and Captain Hassan Nagafi Habibullah. Upon landing, the aircraft was surrounded by up to 20 US technicians, who took care of it and the defecting pilot, while the WSO, who had opposed the defection became an Iraqi POW, was later released with other prisoners (the pilot was later killed in Europe). The F-14A along with the aforementioned F-4E were flown to Saudi Arabia by US pilots.
- On 2 September 1986, 2 Iranian F-4 Phantom and 1 F-14 Tomcat were hijacked to Iraq.

== Iraq ==
- On April 2, 1960, Iraqi pilot Lt. Abbud Salim Hasan flew his British-made Hawker Hunter to Syria, where he asked for political asylum, claiming to have escaped from Communist domination in the air force.
- On November 30, 1963, Iraqi airman Lieutenant Abdel Rahim al-Salim Zuher escaped to the USSR by flying through Iran and landing at an airfield in Baku, Azerbaijan SSR. He gave as reason for his defection an unwillingness to participate in the suppression of Kurdish rebels. The aircraft type in which he defected is not known but it may have been a de Havilland Vampire. The pilot was granted political asylum.
- On 16 August 1966, Iraqi Captain Munir Redfa flew his MiG-21F-13 to Israel as a result of Mossad Operation Diamond. Two years later, Israel gave his MiG-21F-13 and two MiG-17F to the United States for evaluation under the code-name HAVE DOUGHNUT (for the MiG-21), and HAVE DRILL (for the MiG-17).
- Following Captain Munir Redfa's defection, there were at least two Iraqi pilots who defected to Jordan with their MiG-21F-13 jets. Jordan granted them political asylum but returned the aircraft to Iraq.
- On the early morning of 2 December 1981, an Iraqi pilot of the 84th Sqn defected with his MiG-23 to Vahdati Air Base in Iran. He managed to land safely, and subsequently proved to be a superb source of intelligence for the IRIAF. However, the plane was left in the open for several hours too long, and in the afternoon the Iraqi Air Force dispatched a strike against the Iranian base destroying the aircraft with unguided 68mm rockets from Su-20 bombers.
- During Operation Desert Storm in 1991, pilots of around 115 to 140 Iraqi military aircraft defected to Iran. Iran confiscated all of the planes.

== Jordan ==
- On 12 November 1962, a pilot identified as the commander in chief of the Royal Jordanian Air Force Lt. Col. Sahl Mohamed Hamza defected to the United Arab Republic in a de Havilland Heron military transport plane.
- On 13 November 1962, two Royal Jordanian Air Force pilots defected to the United Arab Republic with their Hawker Hunters (#804 & #810).

== Laos ==
- On 16 March 1963, Lieutenant Chert Saibory defected flying his American-made T-28 Trojan to North Vietnam.
- On 10 March 1976, Sunthorn Mongkamsee of Laos landed his American-made Cessna L-19 light observation aircraft in Thailand.
- On 24 August 1979, Laotian pilot Flight Lieutenant Chaisin Chinthenam flew his C-47 Dakota into north eastern Thailand and asked for asylum.

== Lebanon ==
- On 30 December 1987, during the Lebanese Civil War, Druze Lt. Majed Karamah of the Lebanese Air Force flew the French-made Gazelle helicopter from a military base north of Beirut to Shouf, and handed it to the pro-Syrian Druze militia.

== Libya ==
- Shortly before the Egyptian–Libyan War (1977), a Libyan cadet pilot defected in small single-engine SOCATA Rallye by flying to Egypt.
- On 11 February 1981, a Libyan Air Force Captain pilot flying a MiG-23 defected from Libya by flying to Crete, Greece. The pilot claimed that the reason for his defection was the suspicion of his attempt to commandeer a C-130 carrying 19 Libyan Army officers sentenced to death and fly them to Greece. The attempt failed, and sometime later, he became a suspect when Libyan military intelligence found out about his (failed) attempt. The pilot later graduated from Yugoslav Air Force Academy. The aircraft was later returned to Libya on February 14.
- There were a number of defections to Egypt in 1987. First on March 2, a crew of five defected in a C-130 with two of the officers asking for political asylum. Then on March 29, three officers defected on a CH-47 Chinook, while finally on July 16 three more officers defected, this time in a Mi-8.

== Mozambique ==
- On 8 July 1981 Lieutenant Adriano Francisco Bomba flew a MiG-17 from Maputo to over Kruger National Park in South Africa, after which he was intercepted and escorted to land at Air Force Base Hoedspruit. On landing he asked for political asylum. The aircraft was later returned to Maputo by road, after extensive examination, flight testing and an appearance at an air show.

== Netherlands ==
- On March 7, 1964, a young aircraft engineer, Theo van Eijck, of the Dutch Naval Air Arm MLD stole a two-engined Grumman S-2 Tracker maritime patrol aircraft at RAF Hal Far in Malta and flew to Libya. He was trying to defect to Egypt, but did not have enough fuel to reach his destination in Alexandria. He made a perfect landing on a short airstrip near Benghazi, after flying over Benina Airport. The pilot was then granted political asylum by the Libyan authorities, but a year later he agreed to return to the Netherlands and spent a year in prison. The aircraft was returned to the Dutch afterwards.

== Nicaragua ==
- On 12 June 1979, Nicaraguan National Guard pilot Captain Armangal Lara Cruz defected with his armed Cessna O-2 FAN-320 to Costa Rica.
- On 23 December 1985, Sandinista Air Force pilot Sub. Lt. Salvador Blanco Lacayo defected to neighboring Honduras with An-2 light transport plane.
- On 8 December 1988, A Sandinista Air Force pilot Captain Edwin Estrada Leiva defected to Honduras in a Soviet-built Mi-25 attack helicopter.

== North Korea ==
- On April 28, 1950, 24-year-old Lieutenant Lee Kun Soon defected by flying his Soviet-made Ilyushin Il-10 to Pusan, South Korea.
- On September 21, 1953, 21-year-old No Kum-sok, a senior lieutenant in the Korean People's Air Force, flew his MiG-15 to the South and is associated with Operation Moolah. Considered an intelligence bonanza as this fighter plane was then the best the Communist bloc had, No was awarded the then immense sum of $100,000 (just under $1 million adjusted for inflation (2020)) and the right to reside in the United States. An offer to return the MiG was ignored, and the aircraft is now on display at the National Museum of the United States Air Force, Dayton, Ohio.
- On June 21, 1955, North Korean air force pilots Capt. Lee Un-yong and Lt. Lee Eun-song defected to Seoul, South Korea, with a Yak-18 training plane.
- In December 1970, Major Pak Sun-kok, a pilot in the North Korean Air Force, is believed to have defected in Gangwon Province, South Korea with a MiG-15. He is thought to have become a pilot with the Republic of Korea Air Force.
- On February 25, 1983, Captain Lee Ung-pyong (28) of the North Korean Air Force used a training exercise to defect and landed his MiG-19 at an airfield in Seoul. According to then-common practice, he received a commission in the South Korean Air Force, eventually becoming a colonel and taught at the South Korean Air Force academy until his death in 2002. He received a reward of ₩1.2 billion.

== Pakistan ==
- On August 20, 1971, during the Indo-Pakistan of War 1971, Flight Lieutenant Matiur Rahman, an instructor pilot, attempted to defect from the Pakistan Air Force (PAF) and join the separatist fight of Bangladesh, by flying a Lockheed T-33 Shooting Star trainer aircraft with a copy of the Pakistani Armed Forces Operational plan for the Southern theater (which he possibly stole from Air Base Headquarters) from Karachi, Pakistan to India. His attempt was foiled by trainee Pilot Officer Rashid Minhas.

== Poland ==
- In 1949, Lt. Arkadiusz Korobczyński defected with Il-2M3 attack aircraft (No 3) from Polish Navy's air base in Wicko Morskie to Gotland Island in Sweden.
- On March 5, 1953, Polish Lt. Franciszek Jarecki flew from Słupsk (Polish Air Force Base) to Rønne Airport on Bornholm Island in a MiG-15bis (No 346) - a modern Soviet fighter. Western air specialists checked the aircraft and several days later, the MiG returned to the People's Republic of Poland by ship. Jarecki, however, went to the United States, where he provided much important information about modern Soviet aircraft and air tactics.
- On May 20, 1953, Lt. Zdzisław Jaźwiński from 28th Fighter Squadron in Słupsk defected with MiG-15bis to Rønne Airport on Bornholm Island, Denmark.
- On September 25, 1956, Lt. Zygmunt Gościniak from Zegrze Pomorskie defected with MiG-15bis (No 1327) and landed (without using landing gear) at Rønne Airport on Bornholm Island.
- On November 7, 1957, Lt. Kożuchowski from 31st Fighter Squadron in Łask defected with Lim-2 (MiG-15bis, No 1919) and crash-landed near Halland in Sweden.
- On October 12, 1959, Capt. Andrzej Krajewski, Polish Air Force pilot [Lublin/Radom] defected from Grudziadz Aeroclub in a bi-plane with his pregnant wife and three-year-old daughter and landed on a military field near Rønne, Bornholm Island.

== Portugal ==
- On 12 March 1963 1st Lieutenant Jacinto Soares Veloso defected from the Portuguese Air Force by flying his T-6 trainer across the Mozambique-Tanganyika border to Dar es Salaam, where he joined the Mozambique Liberation Front.

== Rhodesia ==
- In 1977, Jurick Goldwasser, a former mayor of Bulawayo and distant cousin of American presidential candidate and senator Barry Goldwater, flew to Botswana in a small private plane and asked for political asylum.

== Saudi Arabia ==
- On 2 October 1962 a twin-engined Saudi Air Force Fairchild C-123 Provider, laden with US-made arms and ammunition said to have been sent by Prince Hassan to the Royal supporters in Yemen, defected to Egypt. Its three crew members sought and were given political asylum. The crew were identified as pilots Rashad Sisha Mecca, Ahmed Hussein Ikka and flight engineer Omar.
- On 3 October 1962 two Saudi Arabian fliers landed an air force training plane in upper Egypt and asked for and received political asylum. It was the second such defection in two days. Pilots identified as Aly El-Azhari and Abdul Wahab.
- On 8 October 1962 two more Saudi Arabian military aircraft defected to Egypt.
- On 11 November 1990, a Royal Saudi Air Force pilot defected with a F-15C Eagle fighter to Sudan during Operation Desert Shield.

== Somalia ==
- On July 12, 1988, a Somalia Air Force pilot Colonel Ahmed Mohamed Hassan defected to Djibouti with his MiG-17F fighter jet, saying that he was refusing to obey orders to bomb civilian targets in the North.
- On May 29, 1989, a Somalia Air Force pilot lieutenant colonel Mohamed Sheikh Ibrahim Yusuf defected to Djibouti with his An-26 transport plane, and requested political asylum.

== South Korea ==
- In September 1949, a South Korean pilot, 1st Lieutenant Pak Yong-ju, defected with his Stinson L-5 to North Korea.
- On December 3, 1952, a South Korean Army Aviator student, 2nd Lt. Kug Yong-am, defected with his L-19 51–4794 to Pyongyang, North Korea.
- In October 1953, a South Korean pilot-instructor Capt. Kim Sung-bai defected with an F-51 Mustang fighter plane to North Korea.
- On January 20, 1954, a South Korean pilot 2nd Lieutenant Choi Mai-chong defected with an L-19 light observation plane to North Korea.

== Soviet Union ==
- On October 9, 1948, Piotr Pirogov and Anatoly Barsov defected (see Defection of Pirogov and Barsov) by flying their Tu-2 bomber from the USSR to Linz, Austria, where they were granted asylum by the American occupational authorities. Barsov returned to the USSR a year later and was executed.
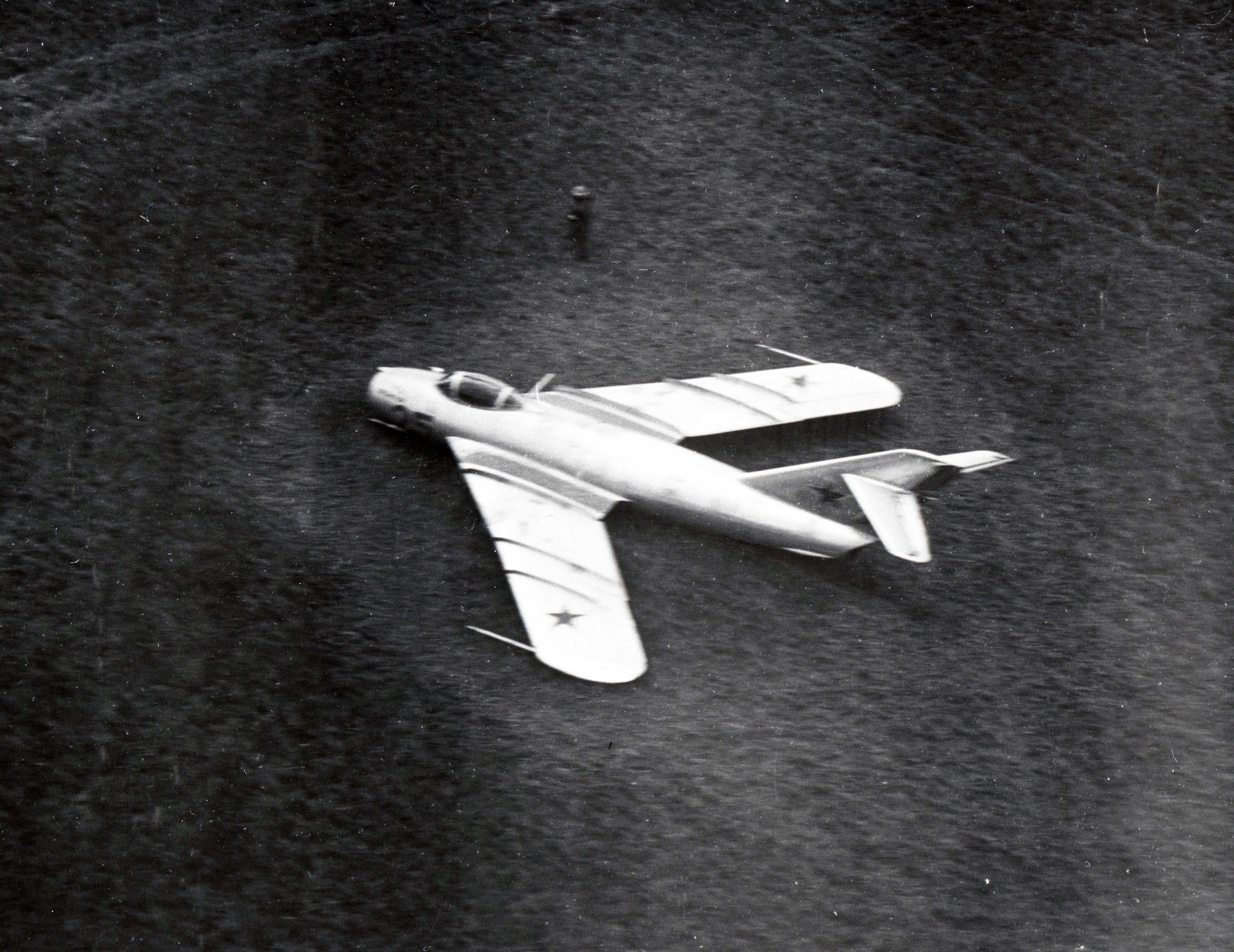
- On May 26, 1967, Lieutenant Vasily Ilych Epatko flew his MiG-17 (No. 25) from East Germany, where he was stationed, to West Germany and made a successful belly-landing in a field near Kicklingen, Bavaria. It was almost immediately photographed by a Canadian CF-104 RECCE aircraft from 1Wing, Lahr, Germany. He was granted asylum by the United States.
- On September 6, 1976, Lieutenant Viktor Belenko flew to Hakodate Airport in Japan and defected with his MiG-25P to Hakodate, Japan. After being inspected by the Foreign Technology Division of the United States DoD, the MiG-25 was released to Japan, who then returned it in pieces to the Soviet Union after having been disassembled and analyzed by the United States.
- On September 25, 1976 Lieutenant Valentin Ivanovich Zosimov (Russian: Валенти́н Ива́нович Зо́симов, 1939–1995) flew his civilian Aeroflot AN‐2 to Iran. In October 1976 after threats by the Soviet Union to send insurgents the Iranian regime, led by Mohammad Reza Pahlavi, forcibly returned Zosimov back to Baku, Azerbaijan where he was sentenced to 12 years in prison. He was sent to Perm-36 from which he was released on October 23, 1986.
- On May 20, 1989, Captain Aleksandr Zuyev defected with his Mikoyan MiG-29 to Trabzon, Turkey. In his autobiography Fulcrum: A Top Gun Pilot's Escape from the Soviet Empire (ISBN 0-446-51648-1), Zuyev reported that the USSR quickly did a deal with the Turkish government upon his defection, and the MiG-29 was returned to the Soviet Union. According to Zuyev himself, the first words he said as he stepped out of the cockpit after his successful defection were: "I'm an American!". He was airlifted out of Turkey by a U.S. C-130 that same night to Ramstein Air Base in West Germany, due to injuries sustained during his escape from the Soviet airbase.

== Syria ==
- On 15–17 August 1968, the pilots of nine Syrian MiG-17s and three MiG-21s defected to Jordan after failing in a coup attempt
- On June 14, 1976, A Palestinian pilot in the Syrian Air Force, Flight Lieutenant Mahmoud Musleh Yasin, defected to Iraq with his MiG-23 Flogger.
- On July 27, 1976, Syrian pilot Captain Ahmed Abdul Qadar Al-Termanini, the "October war" hero, defected to Iraq with his MiG-21 fighter jet.
- On October 11, 1989, Syrian pilot Abdel Bassem landed his MiG-23ML in Israel.

== Taiwan ==
- On 12 January 1955, Major Xao Long defected to the People's Republic of China with his crew, on board a C-46 Commando transport plane.
- On 23 February 1955, Two Republic of China Air Force cadets defected with PT-17 training plane.
- On 18 May 1955, pilot Lieutenant Hui Wei attempted to defect in his F-47 but crash landed just inside Guangdong.
- On 15 August 1956, Major Gang Huang, a Republic of China Air Force Academy instructor pilot, defected to the People's Republic of China with his AT-6 Texan trainer aircraft numbered 106.
- On 1 June 1963, Tingze Xu, a pilot in the Republic of China Air Force 43 Squadron, defected to the People's Republic of China in a F-86F Sabre. In doing so, he took off from Hsinchu Air Base, Taiwan and landed at Longtian, Fujian province, PRC. The aircraft is now on display in the Military Museum of Chinese People's Revolution in Beijing.
- On 26 May 1969, two Republic of China Air Force pilots defected to the People's Republic of China with T-33 Shooting Star trainer aircraft serialled 3024. The crew were later identified as instructor pilot Wang Tianming and cadet Zhu Jingrong. The aircraft is now on display in the Military Museum of Chinese People's Revolution in Beijing.
- On August 8, 1981, Major Huang Zhi Cheng (黄值诚), an instructor pilot, defected to the People's Republic of China with his Northrop F-5F serial 5361. He obtained a reward of US$370,000 (sum immediately returned) and was nominated Deputy Commander of a pilot training school. According to the Chinese government he was the 90th member of the Nationalist forces to defect by plane since 1949.
- On 22 April 1983, Li Dawei (李大维), flying a U-6A Beaver, defected from the Republic of China to the People's Republic of China. The aircraft is now on display in the Military Museum of Chinese People's Revolution in Beijing.
- On 4 May 1986, Wang Xijue (王锡爵), a commercial airline pilot who claimed to have flown U-2 recon overflights of the PRC with the Black Cat Squadron, defected to China with his Boeing 747 jet.
- On 2 November 1989, the pilot of a Taiwan Air Force Northrop F-5E (serial #5120), Lin Xianshun (林贤顺), ejected 80 km inside the Guangdong province of mainland China; the pilotless jet careened down and crashed. Its remains are put on show at the Chinese People's Revolution Museum at Xiaotangshan (Datangshan).

== United States ==
- In March 1962, United States Army soldier Sgt. B. J. Keesee defected to Cuba in a Piper Comanche.
- In July 1963, United States Airman Roberto "Robert" Ramos Michelena defected to Cuba in a T-34 Mentor.
- On 21 May 1967, Major Richard Harwood Pearce, a Bronze Star Medal recipient in the Vietnam War, who was cleared to handle secret US Army materials, defected to Cuba in a Cessna 150 light plane with his four-year-old son. Pearce was granted asylum in Cuba, but returned in 1979.

== Venezuela ==
- On 26 June 1973, Venezuelan Air Force pilot Capt. Aristides Gonzalez Salazar and a crewmember Sgt. Carlos Ramirez Madero defected with Canberra B. (I). Mk.52 jet bomber to Cuba.

== South Vietnam ==
- On 27 February 1962, South Vietnamese pilot Lieutenant Nguyen Van Cu defected to Cambodia with his Douglas A-1H Skyraider (Bu 134485) after failing in a coup attempt.
- On 7 November 1973, South Vietnamese pilot Lieutenant Ho Duy Hung defected to North Vietnam with a US-made UH-1A helicopter serial number 60139.
- On 8 April 1975, a Republic of Vietnam Air Force officer, Captain Nguyen Thanh Trung, bombed the presidential palace in Saigon and defected to North Vietnam in his F-5E.

== Yugoslavia ==
- On 13 September 1953, a Yugoslav Air Force pilot Lieutenant Nikola Jakšić flew his P-47D Thunderbolt to Italy and asked for political asylum after landing at Aviano Air Base. Airport officials quoted him as saying he had "chosen freedom."

== Zimbabwe ==
- On 30 June 1988, a Zimbabwe Air Force pilot Flight Lieutenant Gary Kane stole his Bell 412 helicopter in an abortive attempt to rescue alleged South African agents from prison.

== See also ==
- List of Soviet and Eastern Bloc defectors
- List of Western Bloc defectors
