= John Patterson (diplomat) =

US diplomat abducted and murdered in 1974

John Patterson (1942 or 1943 – 1974) was a diplomat who served as the United States vice consul in Hermosillo, Mexico where he was abducted and murdered.

== Early life and career ==
Patterson studied abroad in France where he first met his wife Andra. He later studied at Columbia Business School. Patterson moved to Washington, D.C. where he worked with the ad hoc commission implementing the Economic Stabilization Act of 1970.

Patterson then attended the Foreign Service’s training program, from which he graduated in 1973. He was to begin his career in Santiago, Chile but was reassigned to Hermosillo, Mexico.

== Abduction and murder ==
Patterson was seen on Friday, March 22, 1974 at around 10:30 AM leaving the consulate in the company of an American. The disclosure of his kidnapping came after U.S. Attorney General William Saxbe was questioned by reporters at to why he postponed his planned trip to Mexico.

A note was left at the consulate general hours after his disappearance demanding a ransom of $500,000 as well as a news blackout on the case. The note began with the words "I have evidently been taken hostage by the People’s Liberation Army of Mexico". There was speculation that the kidnappers were Americans as the ransom note was written on United States made stationery and the ransom was asked for in United States dollars. The United States followed its stated policy of not giving in to blackmail demands, but allowed Patterson's mother and wife to attempt to raise the ransom.

Patterson’s wife Andra apologized for the news coverage of his kidnapping and begged for the kidnappers to contact her. Andra attempted to deliver $250,000 as ransom, but the kidnapper did not appear. She also placed an advertisement in the local paper saying “I have the money you need for transaction. Please contact me so I can send it to you. Anne.”.

The case caused confusion, with Mexican officials refusing to even call it a kidnapping, simply saying that he disappeared. On March 30, 1974, a Mexican government spokesman said they expected Patterson to be released that weekend. Two hundred Mexican police officials combed the desert in search of Patterson.

On July 8, 1974, Patterson's badly decomposed body was found in the desert 345 miles (555 km) north of Hermosillo by a peasant looking for fruit. The skull was broken by blows to the face and back. There was a ring on his finger with his initials and those of his wife, as well as the date of their marriage.

== Investigation ==
FBI agents in Southern California identified Bobby Joe Keesee as a person of interest, after finding that he checked into the Hotel Gandara in Mexico near the consulate. An administrative assistant, who had spotted Patterson leaving, was able to identify Keesee as the person Patterson left with. The voice on the phone call to the consul general on April 10 was also determined to match that of Keesee.

Keesee was arrested on May 28, 1974, in Huntington Beach, California. A pair of handcuffs and two shotgun shells were found in his car.

Keesee confessed that he wrote the letter instructing Patterson’s wife to go to the Rosarito Beach hotel to bring the ransom, but claimed he did so only to provide her with a sense of hope. He otherwise denied involvement in Patterson’s abduction.

During pretrial preparations prosecutors offered Keesee, a plea deal allowing him to plead guilty to a single count of conspiracy to kidnap.

On April 28, 1975, Keesee was sentenced to 20 years in prison. He was paroled in 1986.

== Personal life ==
Patterson first met his wife Andra in college but turned down his proposal before graduation in 1974. Andra married and divorced before rekindling her relationship with Patterson six years later. She had a child, Julia, from her previous marriage, whom she raised with Patterson.
