= Aleksandr Zuyev (pilot) =

Soviet pilot defector (1961–2001)

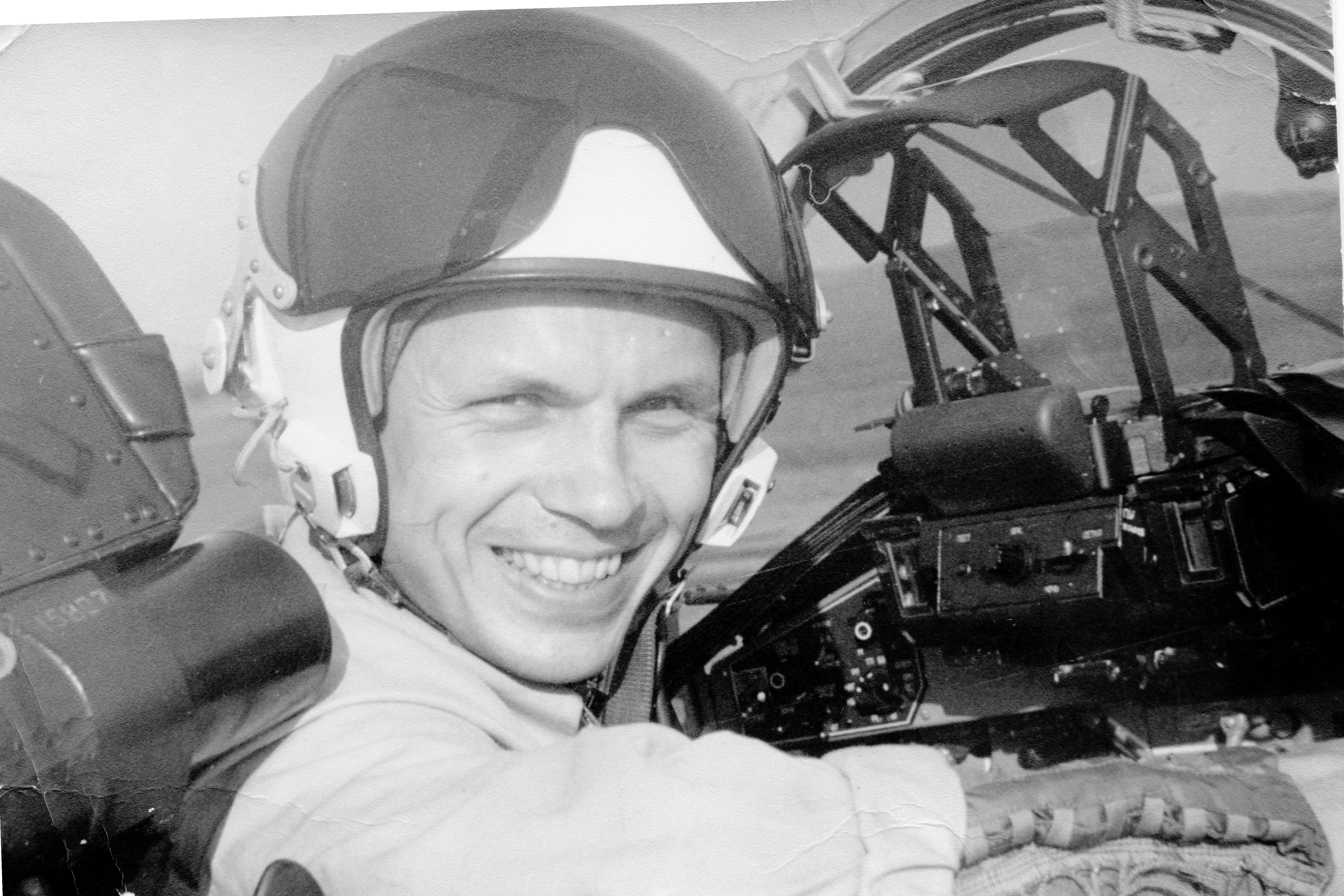
- Born: Aleksandr Mikhailovich Zuyev; July 17, 1961; Soviet Union
- Died: June 10, 2001 (aged 39); Bellingham, Washington, U.S.

Aleksandr Mikhailovich Zuyev (Russian: Александр Михайлович Зуев; July 17, 1961 – June 10, 2001) was a Soviet pilot who defected to the United States by flying to Turkey with his MiG-29 on May 20, 1989.

== Defection ==
Zuyev was an interceptor pilot with the VVS Frontal Aviation Regiment based at Mikha Tskhakaya, Georgian SSR (present day Senaki, Georgia). The day before his defection, he baked a large cake, having mixed a large amount of sleeping pills in the batter. He then announced that his wife was pregnant with a boy, and invited the personnel in his regiment to celebrate. During the party, Zuyev handed each a slice, except for four people: the commander who was preparing a flight plan, two mechanics on guard duty, and a unit member who was expected to be at another base.

When everyone was asleep, Zuyev cut the telephone lines, then approached the aircraft. The two sentries would not let him near the airplane. Zuyev returned and waited for some time past shift change time. The second shift was incapacitated, so one of the sentries went to the squadron. While he was gone, Zuyev approached the airplane and told the mechanic on guard duty that his replacement would be late and that Zuyev would fill in. This mechanic, already upset about his relief being late, was happy to hand Zuyev his assault rifle and walk away.

The other mechanic found everyone asleep at the squadron, and became suspicious of a problem. He returned to the airplane and confronted Zuyev. Zuyev tried but failed to disarm the mechanic, and then wounded him with his pistol. Zuyev himself sustained an arm wound.

The aircraft were almost ready and Zuyev took off in one. After takeoff, he had planned to shoot other aircraft on the ground, but failed because he forgot to remove one of the two locks on the aircraft's cannon. He then flew 240 km (150 mi) south across the Black Sea to Trabzon, Turkey, where the aircraft was impounded. The plane Zuyev had flown was one that had been in storage, and shreds of tarpaulin were still hanging from parts of the plane after it landed.

== Aftermath ==
Turkish officials immediately agreed to a Soviet request to return the MiG-29, with a spokesman emphasising Turkey's wish to maintain good ties with the Soviet Union.

Zuyev's first words at the Turkish airfield were: "Finally, I— an American!" He underwent surgery for his wounds. He was allowed to immigrate to the United States where he settled in San Diego, California, and opened a consulting firm. Zuyev wrote a book titled Fulcrum: A Top Gun Pilot's Escape from the Soviet Empire. Originally, Zuyev faced criminal charges such as hijacking in the Turkish courts, but the charges were dismissed for political reasons.

The seven who ate the cake at Gudauta were seriously incapacitated from the sleeping pills and were hospitalised; however, all seven fully recovered.

Aviation author Yefim Gordon in his 2007 book Mikoyan MiG-29 was sharply critical of Zuyev, referring to a prior suspension of Zuyev for poor discipline and that Zuyev's superiors were considering a dishonorable discharge. Gordon speculated that this is what spurred Zuyev into leaving the Soviet Union.

== Life in the United States ==
On October 26, 1992, Zuyev's second child was born but Zuyev gave up parental rights almost immediately after his birth.

On January 3, 1993, Zuyev claimed that the reason that Korean Air Lines Flight 007 succeeded in crossing over Kamchatka without being intercepted was because Arctic gales had knocked out the Soviet radars on Kamchatka ten days previously, and the local officials had lied to Moscow that it was fixed, allegedly preventing the Soviet Air Force from properly identifying the civilian aircraft before it was shot down. Zuyev first discovered this revelation in 1985 from an officer who was a radar operator on the Sakhalin Island on the night of the ensuing shoot-down.

According to Zuyev's biographical book "Fulcrum", Zuyev began working as a consultant for the CIA and Pentagon. Zuyev went on to assist the US in detecting the radars of MiG-29s during Operation Desert Storm.

On June 10, 2001, Zuyev died along with another aviator, Jerry "Mike" Warren, in a crash near Bellingham, Washington, when their Yakovlev Yak-52 failed to recover from an accelerated stall.

== Work ==
- Zuyev, Alexander (1992). Fulcrum: A Top Gun Pilot's Escape from the Soviet Empire. ISBN 978-0-446-51648-8. Archived from the original on 2014-11-07.

== See also ==
- Viktor Belenko
- List of Cold War pilot defections
- List of Eastern Bloc defectors
