= Chuguyevka (air base) =

Military air base in Primorsky Krai, Russia

Chuguevka (Sokolovka)
- Chuguyevsky District, Primorsky Krai in Russia
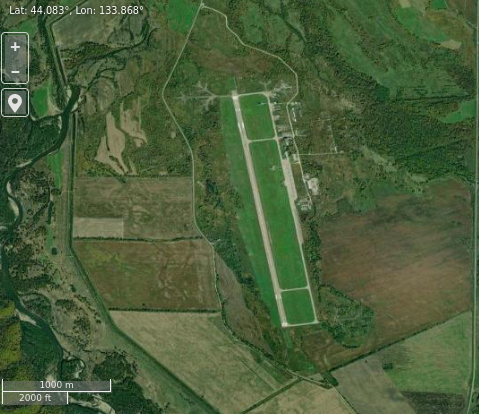
- Satellite imagery of Chuguyevka air base

Site information
- Type: Air Base
- Owner: Ministry of Defence
- Operator: Russian Air Force

Location
- Shown within Primorsky Krai Chuguyevka (Russia)
- Coordinates: 44°5′0″N 133°52′6″E

Site history
- Built: 1955
- In use: 1955-present

Airfield information
- Identifiers: ICAO: XHIS
- Elevation: 305 metres (1,001 ft) AMSL
Runways
Direction	Length and surface
18/36	2,500 metres (8,202 ft) Concrete

Chuguyevka (Russian: Чугуевка) is a military air base of the Russian Air Force in Primorsky Krai, Russia. It is located in Chuguyevsky District, near the towns of Chuguyevka and Bulyga-Fadeyevo, 190 kilometers (120 mi) north-east of Vladivostok. The base was also written in various references as Chuguevka, Sandagou, Sikharovka (erroneous), Sakharovka (erroneous), Sokolovka, and Bulyga-Fadeyevo.

The airbase was built by the Soviet Union with the primary objective of scrambling aircraft against Lockheed SR-71 Blackbird flights over Vladivostok. The primary operator of the base was the 530th Fighter Aviation Regiment PVO (530 IAP) of the 23rd Air Defence Corps (23 K PVO), 11th Independent Air Defence Army, of the Soviet Air Defence Forces.

During the 1960s, Chuguyevka housed Mikoyan-Gurevich MiG-17 (ASCC: Fresco) aircraft, and by 1972 a CIA analysis listed 43 MiG-17 "Fresco" interceptors and 10 Mikoyan-Gurevich MiG-15 UTI (ASCC: Midget) trainers operating at this airfield. By the 1970s as SR-71 flights became an issue of concern, the base was assigned 36 new Mikoyan-Gurevich MiG-25P (NATO: Foxbat) planes.

In September 1976, Chuguyevka Air Base rose to prominence when Viktor Belenko, a MiG-25 pilot stationed at the base, defected to the United States by flying to Hakodate, Japan. This incident was a major security breach for the Soviet Union, and one of the most publicized defections of the Cold War.

From the 1990s, following the dissolution of the Soviet Union, the air base was operated by the Russian Air Defence Forces, and MiG-25s were phased out as the primary aircraft and replaced with Mikoyan-Gurevich MiG-31s. In 1998-99 the ADF was merged with the Air Force, but then the regiment was disestablished on 1 December 2009.

== See also ==
- List of military airbases in Russia
