= Morris Childs =

Ukrainian-American activist (1902–1991)

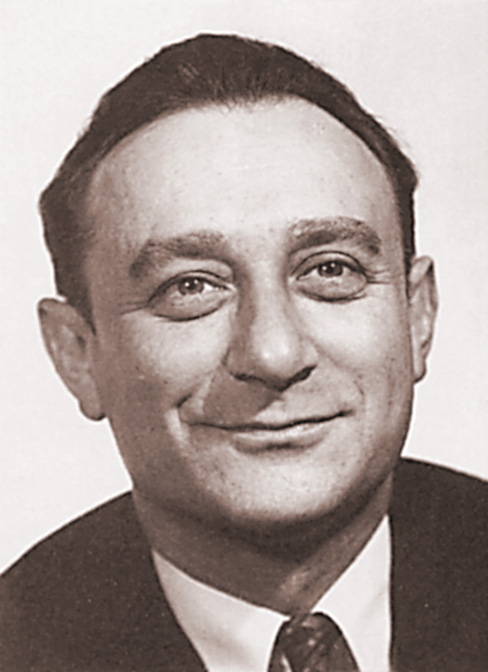
- Morris Childs, Communist functionary and secret FBI informant, as he appeared in the 1940s
- Born: Moishe Chilovsky; June 10, 1902; Kiev, Russian Empire
- Died: June 5, 1991 (aged 88); Chicago, Illinois, U.S.
- Education: International Lenin School
- Political party: Communist Party USA
- Awards: Presidential Medal of Freedom; Order of the Red Banner

Morris H. Childs (born Moishe Chilovsky; June 10, 1902 – June 5, 1991) was an American political activist and American Communist Party functionary who became a Soviet espionage agent (1929) and then a double agent for the Federal Bureau of Investigation (1952) until leaving both services by 1982. Beginning in 1958, Childs acted as a secret courier on behalf of the American party, briefing Soviet officials on political affairs in the American party and carrying funds to support the American Communist movement from Moscow to New York City, reporting details all the while to his FBI handlers. Over the course of two decades of activity in this role, Childs played a major part in the transfer of more than $28 million in Soviet subsidies to the American movement. For his activity as a courier on behalf of the Soviet government, Childs was awarded the Order of the Red Banner in 1975. His work as a spy for the American intelligence community was recognized in 1987 when Childs (together with his brother Jack) was awarded the Presidential Medal of Freedom by President Ronald Reagan.

== Early years ==
Morris H. Childs was born Moishe Chilovsky on June 10, 1902, in Kiev, Russian Empire, to an ethnic Jewish family. The family spoke Russian in the home, not Ukrainian or Yiddish. Morris's father, Josef Chilovsky, engaged in revolutionary activities against the Tsarist regime, for which he was imprisoned and subsequently exiled to Siberia. Josef was able to flee Russia via the Black Sea and he emigrated to the United States, landing in Galveston, Texas, in March 1910.

Josef Chilovsky moved to Chicago, where he worked as a cobbler and bootmaker. As soon as his living situation was established and a small sum of money raised, Josef sent for his wife, Nechame Chilovsky, and their boys, including Moishe and Jakob. The family arrived at Ellis Island in December 1911.

The family name was anglicized from Chilovsky to "Childs" in Chicago. Morris, as Moishe was now known, attended a demanding Jewish school in the city and worked in his father's shoemaking shop and as a messenger in the Chicago financial district. Childs read extensively, favoring particularly works of literature and history, and took courses at the Art Institute of Chicago. There he was exposed to radical ideas among his peers, echoing the dissent which his father felt towards the autocracy in imperial Russia.

== Communist Party career ==
The Russian Revolution of 1917 was a source of great inspiration to the entire Childs family, and news of its dramatic events were breathlessly followed over the next several years. Towards the end of the decade Childs joined a trade union in order to get a job driving a milk delivery wagon, where he first made the acquaintance of members of the then-underground American Communist movement. The combination of his family's radical heritage, the exciting news from Russia, and the enthusiasm of his radical peers caused Morris Childs to become politically engaged, and he took the step of joining the United Communist Party of America in 1921.

During the bitter factional war within the American communist movement throughout the decade of the 1920s, Childs was a consistent supporter of the Chicago-based faction led by William Z. Foster, head of the party's trade union operations. From the mid-1920s, Childs was a protégé and friend of the man who help bring the famous union organizer Foster into the Communist Party's orbit, Earl Browder. When in 1928 the Communist International sent Browder on a dangerous mission to China as a representative of the Communist International's trade union organizing section, the Profintern, Browder left his prized library and papers with Childs, telling him before he left, "if I don't come back, they're yours".

In 1929, Childs was selected by the Communist Party USA (CPUSA) to attend the elite International Lenin School in Moscow, a training school for professional revolutionaries. Early in 1930, Childs was approached by an agent of the Soviet secret police, the OGPU, who had noted in Childs' file that he had helped to successfully identify a police spy in the Communist organization of Chicago. The man asked Childs to become an informer for the agency to help keep tabs on the ideological foibles of his Lenin School comrades. Childs agreed with the request and thereafter provided periodic reports. During his second year at the Lenin School, Childs made the personal acquaintance of a number of high-level Soviet officials who taught courses at the school, including exiled Finnish revolutionary leader Otto Kuusinen and a young ideology expert named Mikhail Suslov.

Childs remained at the Lenin School until 1932. He remained a lifelong friend of Suslov, later a top expert in relations with foreign Communist Parties under Soviet leaders Joseph Stalin, Nikita Khrushchev, and Leonid Brezhnev.

When he returned to the United States in 1933, a young Moscow-trained functionary on the rise, Childs went to work for a Communist Party organization now headed by his old Chicago acquaintance, Earl Browder. Childs was assigned the role of paid sub-district organizer in Milwaukee, Wisconsin. Childs was subsequently moved to Illinois, where he served as State Secretary of the CPUSA for Illinois.

Childs was a candidate for public office for the Communist Party, running for US Congress in an Illinois at-large district in 1936. Childs was also a member of the CPUSA's governing Central Committee.

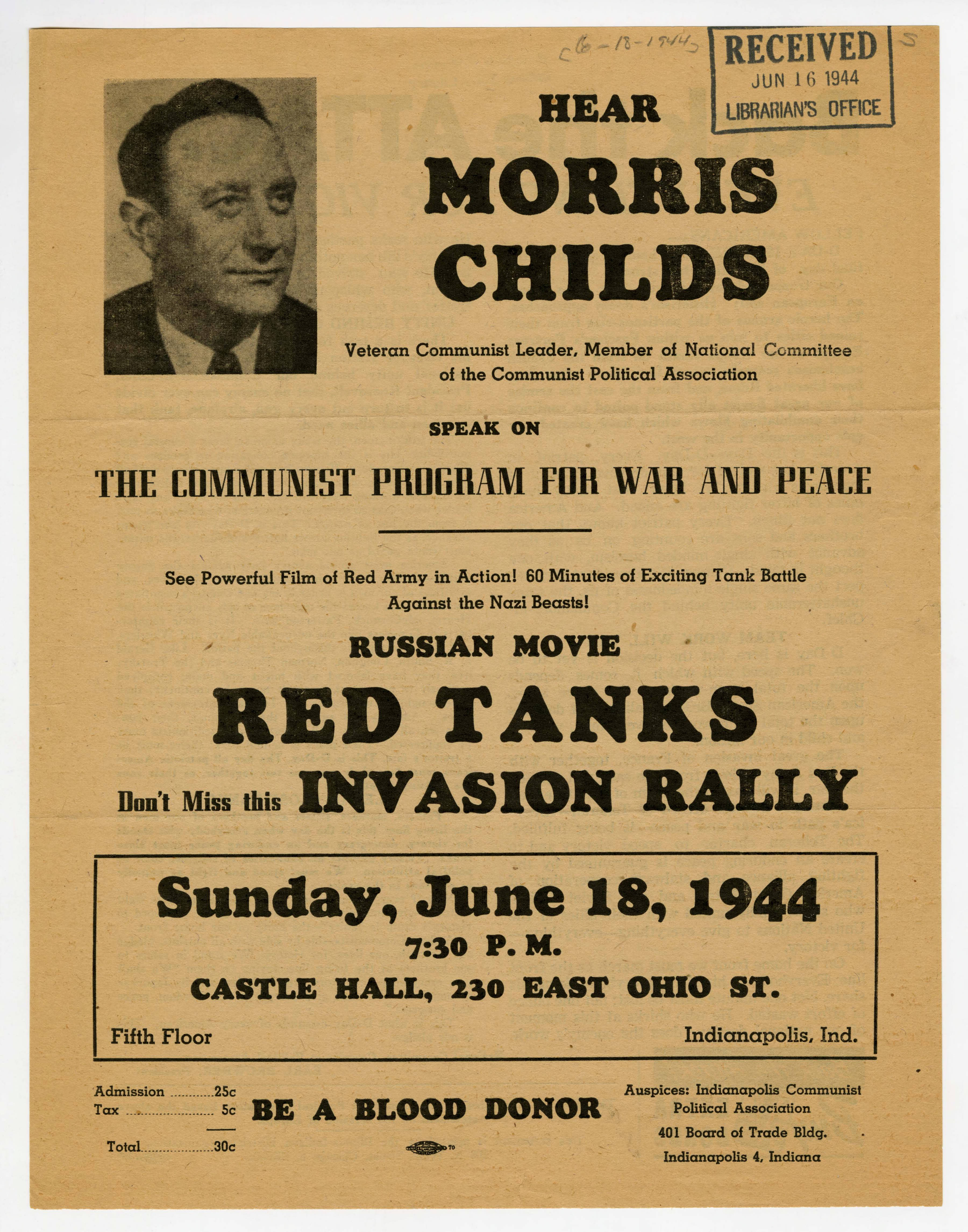
A flyer advertising an "invasion rally" celebrating D-Day with Childs headlining as speaker, June 1944

Morris Childs remained a leading party worker in Illinois through 1945. In December 1945, Childs was named editor of The Daily Worker, the official English-language newspaper of the Communist Party published in New York City and a member of the CPUSA's governing National Committee.

In 1947, Childs, who, having attended the Lenin School was a fluent speaker of Russian, traveled to Moscow on an unspecified mission for the Communist Party, stopping off in France during the return trip to have a conversation with Jacques Duclos, the French Communist Party leader who in 1945, had published criticism of the policies of American CPUSA leader Earl Browder which ultimately led to Browder's ouster. Childs, a supporter of a majority faction headed by Eugene Dennis, was a target of a hardline minority group (which included William Z. Foster, Robert Thompson, and Benjamin Davis) which used Childs's absence from the Daily Worker to engineer his ouster as editor. The Dennis group assented to this maneuver in an attempt to calm troubled waters with the minority.

Childs was surprised with the fait accompli at the June 27, 1947, plenary meeting of the National Committee, at which he was forced to resign the editorial post, ostensibly due to the heart ailment which plagued him. Exacerbating the situation, Childs was not even informed of Dennis's decision that he was to be removed until the matter was brought up at the meeting. On Dennis's motion, Childs was given an indefinite leave of absence as Daily Worker editor, replaced by Spanish Civil War veteran Johnny Gates. Childs returned home to Chicago, smarting from his comrades' betrayal, and discontinued further party activities, citing reasons of health.

=== Jack Childs ===
Morris's younger brother Jakob "Jack" Childs was also a Communist. He, too, benefited from General Secretary Earl Browder's patronage, with Browder seeing to Jack's appointment as the business manager of the Young Communist League in New York City in 1931. In 1932 Browder tapped Jack Childs to attend the Lenin school to be trained as a communications expert, since the Comintern now sought those holding American passports because of their versatility.

Whereas Morris had been trained for work as a top party functionary and excelled in Moscow, Jack's training was more specialized and he was not a top student. He nevertheless proved himself courageous and useful as a courier transporting money to the Communist Party of Germany in Nazi Germany on behalf of the Comintern in 1933.

Upon his return to the United States, Jack was put to work at the side of Earl Browder at party headquarters in New York City, acting as chauffeur, personal assistant, and bodyguard. This proximity to Browder was a blessing when the "man from Kansas" was General Secretary of the CPUSA but became a curse in 1945 when Browder was removed from his leadership position and expelled from the party, ostensibly for his "revisionism". As a so-called "Browderite", Childs also lost his party job, instead making use of his former radio training to open a small electrical and painting supply store in New York City.

Jack Childs dropped out of the Communist Party in 1947 and spent his time and money taking care of his physically ailing brother as best he was able. His sudden lack of party activity generated a routine September exploratory visit by two special agents of the FBI in an effort to gauge his level of disaffection and to see whether he might be a willing source of information about the top levels of the Communist Party.

Jack was happy to lend assistance to the FBI, declaring to them that he "never really believed any of that communist bullshit" and that he had been active in the Communist Party merely for the sake of his brother, who had been a true believer and a figure of authority. As Morris had been abandoned, fired from his job and left penniless, as well as stricken by a heart attack and seemingly near death, he had begun to question the Communist Party. When his FBI interlocutors intimated to Jack Childs their desire to infiltrate the top level of the Communist Party with an informant, Jack had a potential solution, declaring "Morris is your ticket to the top".

=== Courier and informer ===
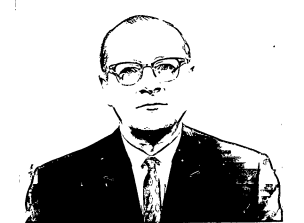
Special agent Carl N. Freyman

In April 1952, Special Agent Carl Freyman of the Chicago office of the FBI made a successful appeal to Morris Childs to go to work as a secret government informant. Acting on its own authority, the Chicago office undertook to pay for Morris's treatment at the Mayo Clinic, managing to restore him physically.

Over the next several years — a period during which the Communist Party was forced into retreat by the combined forces of government action and the public antipathy that was part of the Second Red Scare — the Childs brothers worked themselves back into the good graces of top party leaders.

The oblique communications between the Communist Parties of the Soviet Union and the United States forced upon the Americans by the Smith Act proved inefficient and ineffectual and in 1956 the FBI learned that a move was planned to reestablish direct ties between Moscow and New York.

Childs was picked as the secret FBI informant with the greatest likelihood of being named by the CPUSA's leadership as liaison between the Soviet and American Communist Parties. The FBI did their best to steer their informant towards this sensitive new position. This effort was rewarded in July 1957, when CP leader Eugene Dennis told Childs to begin making preparations to covertly travel to Moscow as the representative of the Secretariat of the CPUSA.

In 1958, Childs made the first of what would ultimately be 52 secret trips to Moscow on behalf of the Communist Party USA, bringing information on affairs in the turbulent American party and making arrangements for the delivery of cash for its support from the International Department of the Communist Party of the Soviet Union.

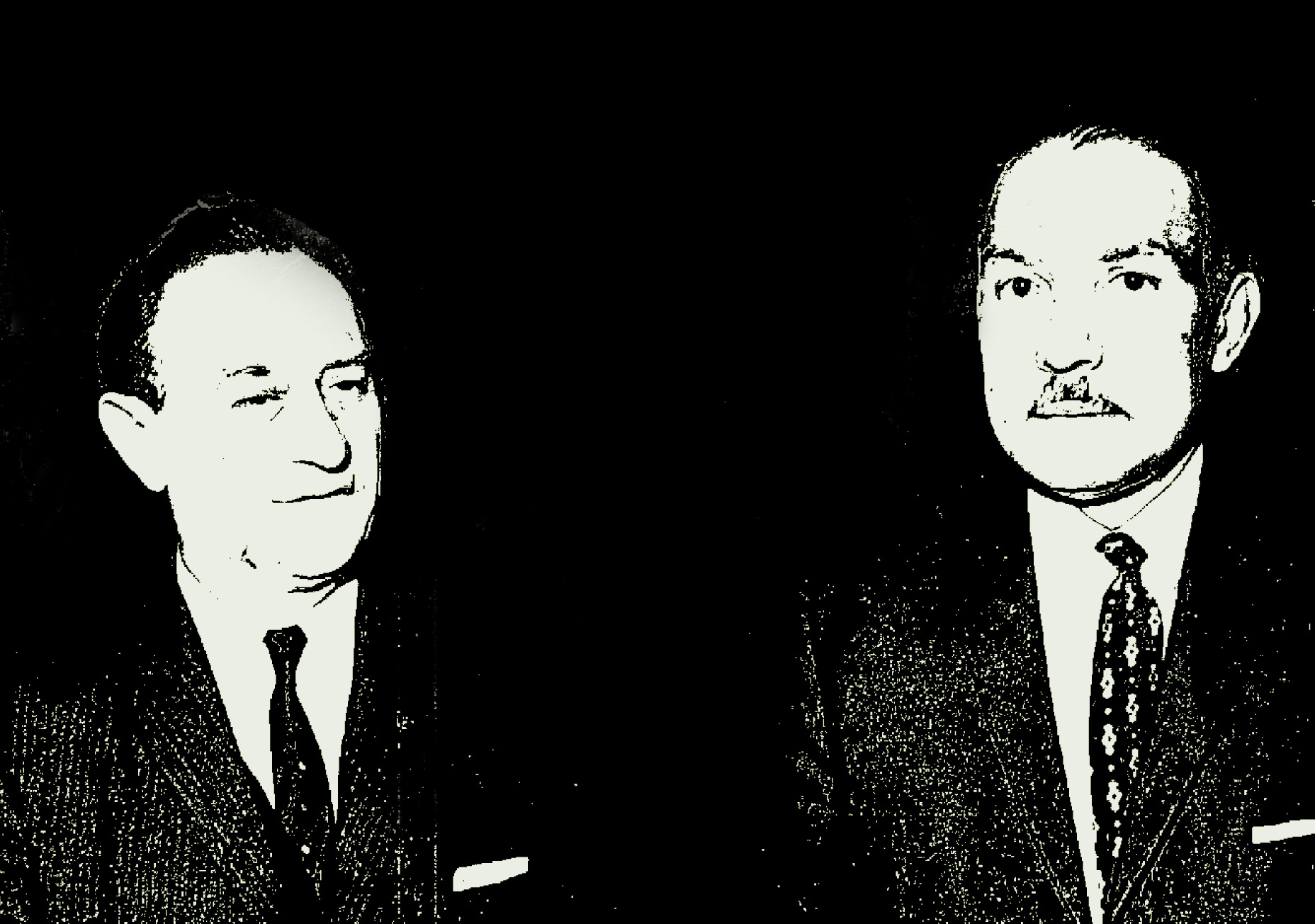
Childs and CPUSA leader James E. Jackson at the 21st Congress of the Communist Party of the Soviet Union, January 1959.

Childs was one of two delegates to the 21st Congress of the CPSU, held in Moscow from January 27 to February 5, 1959. Joining Childs in the Soviet Union as an official representative of the American Communist Party was James E. Jackson Jr., husband of Esther Cooper Jackson.

The CPSU held Childs in great esteem. In 1975, in honor of his 75th birthday, Soviet leader Leonid Brezhnev hosted a banquet in Childs' honor at the Kremlin, where he quietly presented him with a medal, the Order of the Red Banner, for the services which he performed conducting funds on behalf of the CPSU's international department.

Childs undertook his last mission to Moscow in 1977. Over the course of his two decades as a courier, Childs was instrumental in helping with the transfer of over $28 million from the Communist Party of the Soviet Union to the Communist Party of the US to help fund its activities. Each and every transaction was painstakingly reported by Childs to his FBI handlers, along with information about affairs in the Soviet and American communist parties, as well as inside information about the international communist movement.

Childs remained on the FBI's payroll until his retirement in 1982. Owing to the sensitivity and critical importance of his mission only a very small group inside the FBI knew of Childs' identity and the Bureau further minimized the size by keeping four agents in the Chicago and New York field offices solely on Operation SOLO for 13 years or more — with Special Agent Walter Boyle putting in a full 20 years on the Childs case. Never before or since in the FBI's history has it kept agents on a single case for such a protracted period.

In honor of their services rendered to the United States government as secret FBI informers, in 1987 Morris and Jack Childs were each awarded the Presidential Medal of Freedom by President Ronald Reagan, with Jack's award coming posthumously.

== Death and legacy ==
Morris Childs died June 5, 1991, aged 88, in Chicago.

In 1962, Morris was married to Eva Childs, who often took part in his frequent trips to Moscow and was herself an FBI informant.

Morris Childs' papers are held by the Hoover Institution Archives at Stanford University in Palo Alto, California. Additional material relating to Morris Childs is to be found in the John Barron papers, also held by the Hoover Institution Archives. Barron, a former editor at Reader's Digest magazine, was the author of a book on Operation SOLO which was published in 1996 and accumulated copious materials on the post-World War II CPUSA during the course of his research.

== Works ==
- Illinois Needs a Farmer-Labor Party. Chicago: Workers Literature Distributors, 1936.
- Illinois Program and Publicity Committee, 20th Anniversary USSR, 1917-1937: Souvenir Book. (Contributor.) Chicago: Communist Party of the United States of America, 1937.
- Unite the People of Illinois for Jobs, Security, Peace and Democracy. Chicago: Illinois State Committee of the Communist Party, 1938.

== Operation SOLO files ==
- FBI SOLO FBI files Washington, DC: Federal Bureau of Investigation —Very large file.
- F.J. Baumgardner, "Baumgardner Memorandum of 19 June 1958." Washington, DC: Federal Bureau of Investigation, August 2011. —Memo summarizing genesis of Operation SOLO.
