= MiG Pilot: The Final Escape of Lieutenant Belenko =

1980 biography

- Author: John Barron
- Language: English
- Genre: Biography
- Published: 1980
- Publication place: United States
- ISBN: 0380538687

MiG Pilot: The Final Escape of Lieutenant Belenko is a 1980 biography by John Barron about the life and 1976 defection of Soviet Mikoyan-Gurevich MiG-25 fighter pilot Viktor Belenko to the United States.
