= Yefim Gordon =

Lithuanian aircraft photographer and author

- Born: 1950 (age 75–76); Vilnius
- Military career
- Allegiance: Soviet Union

Yefim Gordon (Russian: Ефим Гордон, born 1950 in Vilnius, Soviet Union) is a Lithuanian-born aircraft photographer and author who specializes in Soviet aircraft and Russian aviation.

== Biography ==
Gordon graduated in 1972 from the Polytechnic Institute Kaunas as an engineer / electronic technician. Since 1973 he lives in Moscow, where he collected as a hobby photographs and books on the history of Soviet aviation. This collection became a large archive. Since the 1980s he is a professional aviation journalist and writer. He has authored and co-authored about 100 books on Soviet and Russian aviation in Russian, English, Polish and Czech, published articles in nearly 100 journals and photo reports. He also works as a photographer. The 2018 edition of Jane's All The World's Aircraft shows 50 of his photographs.

Gordon is co-owner of the Moscow aviation publisher Polygon Press Ltd. His works are also distributed by Midland publishing (now Ian Allan Publishing), Hikoki Publications Japan and Crécy publishing ltd. As a co-author, he regularly collaborates with Dmitri and Sergei Komissarov.

== Publications (selection) ==
- with Vladimir Rigman Tupolev Tu-144 Hinckley, Leicestershire Midland 2005 ISBN 978-1-85780-216-0
- with Vladimir Rigmant OKB Tupolev. A History of the Design Bureau and its Aircraft Hinckley, Leicestershire Midland 2005 ISBN 1-85780-214-4
- Tupolev Tu-144 Hinckley, Leicestershire Midland 2006 ISBN 1-85780-216-0
- RedStar Number 33 Antonov An-12: The Soviet Hercules with Dmitri Komissarov Hinckley Midland 2007 ISBN 978-1-85780-255-9
- with Sergei & Dmitry Komissarov U.S. Aircraft in the Soviet Union and Russia Midland Publishing 2009 ISBN 978-1-85780-308-2
- with Vladimir Rigmant OKB Tupolev Midland Publishing 2000 ISBN 1-85780-214-4 325-327
- Unflown Wings: Soviet / Russian Unrealized Aircraft Projects 1925–2010 with Sergei Komissarov Birmingham Ian Allan Publishing 2013 ISBN 978-1-906537-34-0
- with Sergei Komissarov OKB Sukhoi A History of the Design Bureau and its Aircraft Ian Allan Publishing ISBN 978-1-85780-314-3
- —; Kommisarov, Dmitriy (19 July 2015). Il'yushin/Beriyev A-50: The 'Soviet Sentry'. FlightCraft. Vol. 6. Pen and Sword Books. ISBN 978-1473823914. OCLC 925303234. OL 38289944M – via Google Books.
- —; Komissarov, Dmitriy; Komissarov, Sergey (10 March 2005). OKB Ilyushin: A History of the Design Bureau and its Aircraft. Hinckley, England: Midland Publishing Ltd. ISBN 978-1-85780-187-3. LCCN 2007531537. OCLC 56539257. OL 9001242M.

Famous Russian Aircraft Series

- Mikoyan MiG-31 (2020) ISBN 978-1910809419
- Sukhoi Su-25 ( 2020 ) ISBN 978-1910809402
- Mikoyan MiG-23 & MiG-27 (2019) ISBN 978-1910809310
- Mikoyan MiG-29 & MiG-35 (2019) ISBN 978-1910809228
- Sukhoi Su-27 & 30/33/34/35 (2019) ISBN 978-1910809181
- Tupolev Tu-95 & Tu-142 (2018) ISBN 978-1857803785
- Mikoyan MiG-19 (2017) ISBN 978-1910809075
- Mikoyan MiG-17 (2016) ISBN 978-1857803723
- Ilyushin IL-28 (2016) ISBN 978-1857803716
- Sukhoi Su-24 (2015) ISBN 978-1857803709
- Tupolev TU-22/TU-22M (2012) ISBN 978-1857803563
- Sukhoi Su-7 and Su17/20/22 Fighter Bomber Family (2012) ISBN 978-1857803457
- Mikoyan MiG-15 (2011) ISBN 978-1857803334
- Ilyushin Il-2/Il-10 (2010) ISBN 978-1857803228
- Mikoyan MiG-21 (2008) ISBN 978-1857802573
- Sukhoi Su-27 (2007) ISBN 978-1857802474
- Mikoyan MiG-29 (2007) ISBN 978-1857802313

Red Star Series

- Sukhoi S-37 and Mikoyan MFI: Russian Fifth-Generation Fighter Technology, Red Star Volume 1, ISBN 978-1857801200
- Flankers: The New Generation, Red Star Volume 2, ISBN 978-1857801217
- Polikarpov's I-16 Fighter: Its Forerunners and Progeny, Red Star Volume 3, ISBN 978-1857801316
- Early Soviet Jet Fighters: The 1940s and Early 1950s, Red Star Volume 4, ISBN 978-1857801392
- Yakovlev's Piston-Engined Fighters, Red Star Volume 5, ISBN 978-1857801408
- Polikarpov's Biplane Fighters, Red Star Volume 6, ISBN 978-1857801415
- Tupolev Tu-4: Soviet Superfortress, Red Star Volume 7, ISBN 978-1857801422
- Tupolev Tu-160 Blackjack: Russia's Answer to the B-1, Red Star Volume 9, ISBN 978-1857801477
- Lavochkin's Piston-Engined Fighters, Red Star Volume 10, ISBN 978-1857801514
- Myasischev M-4 and 3M: The First Soviet Strategic Jet Bomber, Red Star Volume 11, ISBN 978-1857801521
- Antonov's Turboprop Twins: An-24/An-26/An-30/An-32, Red Star Volume 12, ISBN 978-1857801538
- Mikoyan's Piston-Engined Fighters, Red Star Volume 13, ISBN 978-1857801606
- Mil Mi-8/Mi-17: Rotary-Wing Workhorse and Warhorse, Red Star Volume 14, ISBN 978-1857801613
- Antonov An-2: Annushka, Maid of all Work, Red Star Volume 15, ISBN 978-1857801620
- Sukhoi Interceptors: The Su-9/-11/-15 and other types, Red Star Volume 16, ISBN 978-1857801804
- Early Soviet Jet Bombers: The 1940s and Early 1950s, Red Star Volume 17, ISBN 978-1857801811
- Antonov's Heavy Transports: Big Lifters for War and Peace, Red Star Volume 18, ISBN 978-1857801828
- Soviet Heavy Interceptors, Red Star Volume 19, ISBN 978-1857801910
- Soviet/Russian Unmanned Aerial Vehicles, Red Star Volume 20, ISBN 978-1857801934
- Antonov's Jet Twins: The An-72/-74 Family, Red Star Volume 21, ISBN 978-1857801996
- Mil's Heavylift Helicopters: Mi-6/Mi-10/V-12/Mi-26, Red Star Volume 22, ISBN 978-1857802061
- Soviet/Russian AWACS Aircraft: Tu-126, A-50, An-71 and Ka-31, Red Star Volume 23, ISBN 978-1857802153
- Tupolev Tu-144: Russia's Concorde, Red Star Volume 24, ISBN 978-1857802160
- Ilyushin IL-12 and IL-14: Successors to the Li-2, Red Star Volume 25, ISBN 978-1857802238
- Russia's Military Aircraft in the 21st Century, Red Star Volume 26, ISBN 978-1857802245
- Lisunov Li-2: The Soviet DC-3, Red Star Volume 27, ISBN 978-1857802283
- Beriev's Jet Flying Boats, Red Star Volume 28, ISBN 978-1857802368
- Kamov -27/-32 Family, Red Star Volume 29, ISBN 978-1857802375
- Soviet Rocket Fighters, Red Star Volume 30, ISBN 978-1857802450
- Tupolev Tu-114: The First Soviet Intercontinental Airliner, Red Star Volume 31, ISBN 978-1857802467
- Lavochkin's Last Jets, Red Star Volume 32, ISBN 978-1857802535
- Antonov An-12: The Soviet Hercules, Red Star Volume 33, ISBN 978-1857802559
- Mikoyan MiG-25 Foxbat: Guardian of the Soviet Borders, Red Star Volume 34, ISBN 978-1857802597

Soviet Secret Projects Series

- Soviet Secret Projects: Fighters Since 1946 v. 2 (2005) ISBN 978-1857802214
- Soviet Secret Projects: Bombers Since 1945 v. 1 (2004) ISBN 978-1857801941
