= Bobby Joe Keesee =

American fraudster

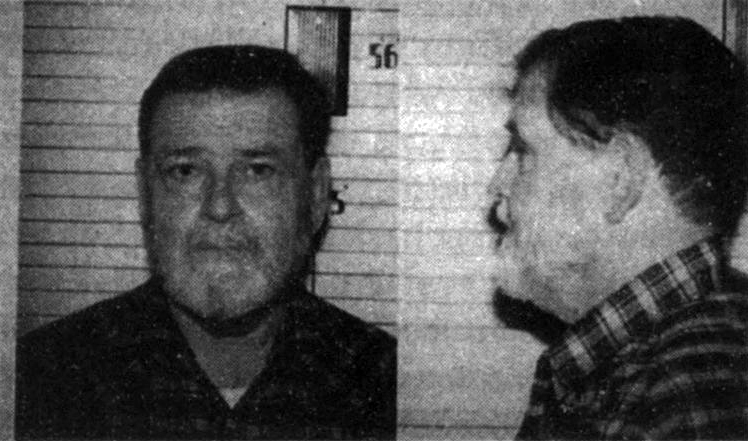
Bobby Joe Keesee, at the time of his extradition. (Photo by U.S. Marshal’s Office)

Bobby Joe Keesee (February 18, 1934 – December 31, 2010) was a former United States Army sergeant, convicted fraudster and murderer of United States Vice Consul John Patterson and boat racer Harry Christensen.

== Early life and military career ==
Keesee was from a small town in the Texas Panhandle. He dropped out of eighth grade. At age 17, he enlisted in the army and fought in the Korean War. Keesee claimed to have been awarded the Purple Heart and the Bronze Star during the Korean War, but there is no record that he sustained any war time injuries. He returned to the United States in 1953 and decided to make the U.S. Army his career, becoming a sergeant and serving on bases in Japan, Germany and Iceland.

== Army desertion ==
In January 1962 he went AWOL from his base at Fort Huachuca, Arizona. On March 23, 1962, he rented an airplane under the guise of visiting a sick relative but instead flew to Havana, Cuba and requested political asylum. He was jailed for 49 days and then sent back to the United States where he was indicted by the federal government. He claimed to be working for the CIA in an attempt to destabilize the communist regime in Cuba. Keesee was convicted of a single count of theft and was sentenced to five years in prison, of which he served three.

== North Vietnam prisoner ==
On September 18, 1970, Keesee hijacked a plane and flew to Hanoi where he was captured and tortured. In 1973, Keesee was released as a prisoner from North Vietnam along other POWs.

== Murder of U.S. vice consul ==
On Friday, March 22, 1974, at around 10:30 a.m., Keesee was seen leaving the U.S. consulate in Hermosillo, Mexico, with the vice consul, John Patterson. Patterson never appeared at his scheduled destination. A note was left at the consulate general hours after his disappearance, demanding a ransom of $500,000 as well as a news blackout on the case. The note began with the words "I have evidently been taken hostage by the People’s Liberation Army of Mexico". There was speculation from the outset that the kidnappers were Americans as the ransom note was written on United States made stationery and the ransom was asked for in United States dollars. The United States refused to pay the ransom, as per its stated policy of not giving in to blackmail demands but allowed Patterson's wife to attempt to do so.

Andra Patterson attempted to deliver $250,000 as ransom, but Keesee did not appear. The case caused confusion, with Mexican officials refusing to even call it a kidnapping, simply saying that Patterson had disappeared. On March 30, 1974, a Mexican government spokesman said Patterson was expected to be released that weekend. Two hundred Mexican police officials combed the desert in search of Patterson.

Patterson's badly decomposed body was found in the desert 345 miles (555 km) north of Hermosillo by a peasant looking for fruit. The skull was broken by blows to the face and back. There was a ring on his finger with his initials and those of his wife.

FBI agents in Southern California identified Keesee as a person of interest after finding that he checked into the Hotel Gandara in Mexico near the consulate. An administrative assistant who had spotted Patterson leaving was able to identify Keesee as the person who left with Patterson. The voice on the phone call to the consul general on April 10 was also found to match Keesee's.

Keesee was arrested on May 28, 1974, in Huntington Beach, California. A pair of handcuffs and two shotgun shells were found in his car.

Keesee confessed that he wrote the letter instructing Patterson’s wife to go to the Rosarito Beach hotel to bring the ransom, but claimed he did so only to provide her with a sense of hope. He otherwise denied involvement in Patterson’s abduction.

Prosecutors offered Keesee a plea deal during pretrial preparations, allowing him to plead guilty to a single count of conspiracy to kidnap.

On April 28, 1975, Keesee was sentenced to 20 years in prison. He was paroled in 1986.

== FEMA scam ==
On January 4, 1996, Keesee pleaded guilty to impersonating a FEMA official in Long Beach, California, while distributing fraudulent purchase orders that were purportedly to buy equipment to fight disasters.

== Murder of Harry Christensen ==
On January 6, 1999, Keesee shot Harry Christensen, a championship power boat racer and owner of a custom boat business. Keesee was responding to an advertisement for Christensen’s plane.

Keesee was arrested on January 7, 1999 with Christensen’s ring, watch and credit cards in his possession. The body was found on May 2 in a remote desert in Sandoval County, New Mexico.

To avoid a death sentence, Keesee pleaded guilty to multiple federal charges. On March 31, 2000, Keesee was sentenced to two life terms without parole.

== Death ==
Keesee died of lung cancer in prison in December 2010.
