= Commodore Downs =

Horse racing track in Pennsylvania, US

Commodore Downs was a 3/4 mile American horse racing track located in Fairview Township, Erie County, Pennsylvania.

The $4 million facility opened for its first season of racing in 1973 after a one-year delay due to financial problems. From the outset, the track had consistently low attendance and purses averaging less than $20,000, making it difficult to attract popular horses. Industrialist Franciszek Jarecki bought the track in January 1980 for $600,000 after serving on the board of directors for many years. Hoping to bring in new management, Jarecki attempted to break the lease with Lakelands Racing Association, who previously operated the facility, but was forced to continue the lease due to an unfavorable court ruling.

Lakeland's efforts continued to fail, leading to the tracks' closing in 1983 with $1.8 million in debt. The track signed an agreement with the Washington Trotting Association to reopen as Lakeshore Meadows in 1984 with harness racing, but closed again after only one year. A final attempt to save the track in 1986 under the name Erie Downs failed as well. Those problems persisted and the track closed quietly in 1988. Today the property is the site of an industrial park.
