= Franciszek Jarecki =

Polish Air Force pilot who defected to the west with an MiG 15

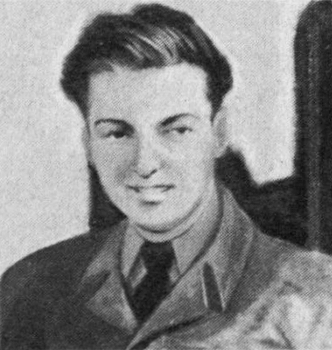
- Portrait on a propaganda leaflet used in Operation Moolah

Personal details
- Born: 07 September 1931 Gdów, Second Republic of Poland
- Died: 24 October 2010 (aged 79) Erie, United States of America
- Awards: Silver Cross of Merit

Military service
- Allegiance: Polish People's Army
- Branch/service: Polish People's Army Air Force
- Years of service: 1946–1953
- Rank: Second Lieutenant

Franciszek Jarecki (September 7, 1931 – October 24, 2010) was a pilot in the Polish Air Force who became famous in early 1953 when he escaped Soviet-controlled Poland in a Mikoyan-Gurevich MiG-15 jet, one of the best Soviet planes at that time.

== Early life ==
Jarecki was born in 1931 in Gdów, a town near Kraków. His family soon moved to Stanisławów, where his father died in 1939, and in 1945 was deported by the Soviets to Bytom, Upper Silesia. He was a graduate of a prestigious Polish Air Force Academy in Dęblin. Some time in the early 1950s, he was moved to Słupsk in northern Poland, near the Baltic Sea. There he flew MiG-15s, as several were operated by the Polish Air Force.

== Defection ==
Frank Jarecki's flightsuit on display at the Smithsonian Air and Space Museum

On the morning of March 5, 1953 (coincidentally, the day of Joseph Stalin's death), Jarecki escaped Poland in a MiG-15. The decision was a very risky one, as the People's Army of Poland had previously shot those who tried to escape. For example, Edward Pytko, an instructor at Dęblin, tried to escape in a Yakovlev Yak-9 to West Germany in 1952, but was stopped by Soviet aircraft over Czechoslovakia and handed back to the Poles; Pytko was charged with high treason and executed. Jarecki flew from Słupsk to the field airport at Rønne on the Danish island of Bornholm. The whole trip took him only a few minutes. There, specialists from the United States, called by Danish authorities, thoroughly checked the plane. According to international regulations, they returned it by ship to Poland a few weeks later.

Jarecki remained in the West. From Denmark, he moved to London, where General Władysław Anders awarded him the Cross of Merit, and then to the United States, where he provided crucial information about modern Soviet aircraft and air tactics. Among those who shook his hand was President Dwight D. Eisenhower. Jarecki received a $50,000 prize (equivalent to $602,000 in 2025) for the person who was first to present a MiG-15 to the Americans and became a U.S. citizen.

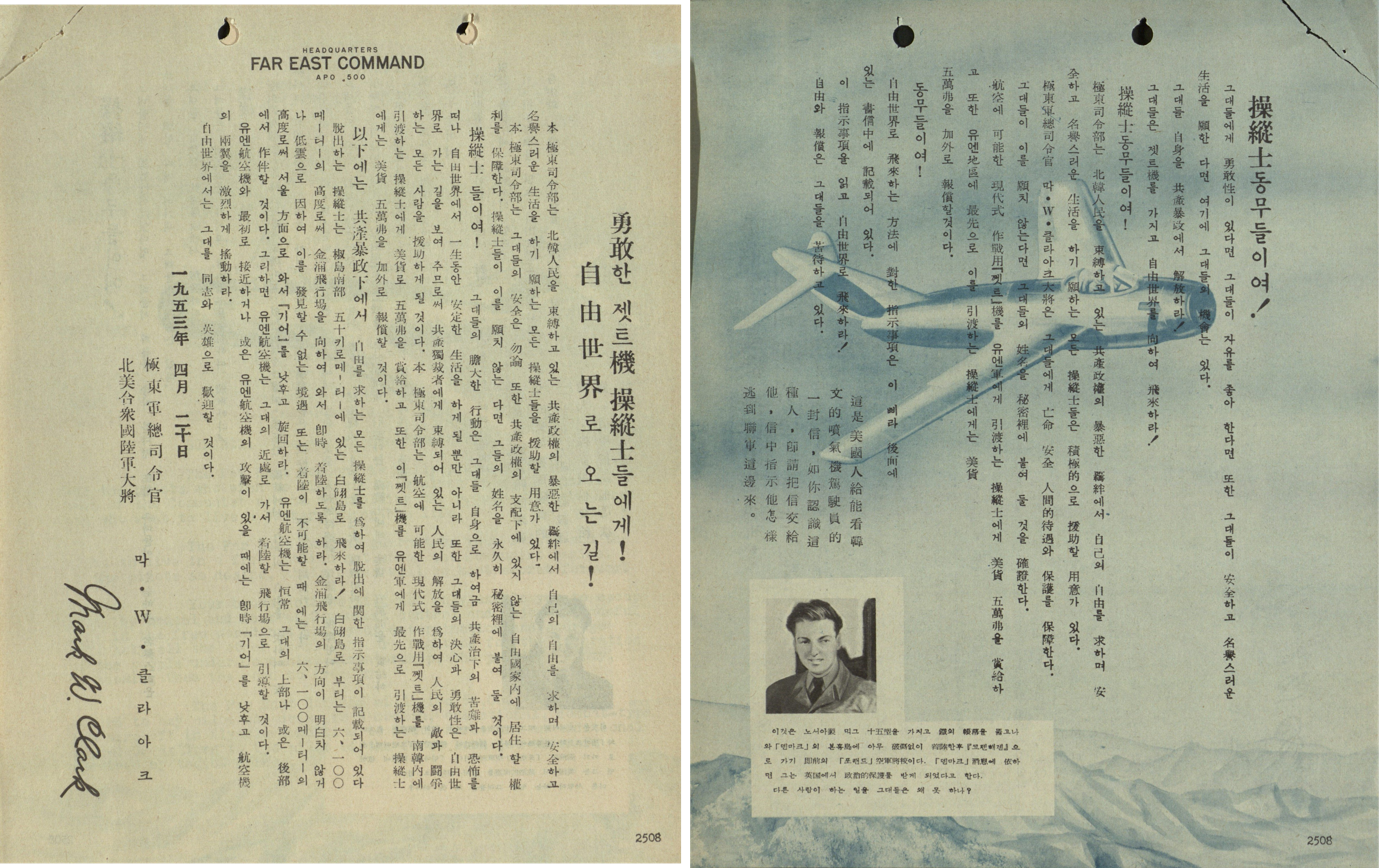
A propaganda leaflet featuring Jarecki's story, produced shortly after his defection for Operation Moolah, encouraging North Korean pilots to defect with their jet fighters.

A few months later, another Polish pilot, Zdzisław Jażwinski, escaped with a MiG-15 to Bornholm. Three years later, four students of Dęblin's school escaped in two Yakovlev Yak-18s, crossing Czechoslovakia to land near Vienna in neutral Austria. The leaflets used in Operation Moolah during the Korean War carried a photo of Jarecki.

== Later life ==
After some time in London, England, Jarecki moved to the United States, living in Pennsylvania until his death on October 24, 2010. He achieved a college degree at Alliance College, and went into business, owning a factory in Fairview, Pennsylvania, called Jarecki Valves, and Commodore Downs, a local horse racing track. The uniform in which he escaped can be seen at the National Air and Space Museum in Washington, D.C. In 2006, Polish TV Station TVN made a film, Jarecki, which is part of the "Great Escapes" series. The series shows stories about Poles who escaped the country between 1944–1989 and chose a life in the West.

== See also ==
- List of Cold War pilot defections
- List of Eastern Bloc defectors
