= John Barron (American journalist) =

American journalist (1930–2005)

- Born: John Daniel Barron; January 26, 1930; Wichita Falls, Texas, U.S.
- Died: February 24, 2005 (aged 75); Virginia, U.S.
- Education: University of Missouri
- Occupations: Journalist; investigative writer
- Writing career
- Notable awards: Raymond Clapper Memorial Award (1964)

John Daniel Barron (January 26, 1930 – February 24, 2005) was an American journalist and investigative writer. He wrote several books about Soviet espionage via the KGB and other agencies.

== Early life ==
John Barron was born January 26, 1930, in Wichita Falls, Texas, the son of a Methodist minister.

He graduated from the University of Missouri and studied Russian at the United States Naval Postgraduate School in Monterey, California. He served in Berlin as a naval intelligence officer.

== Journalistic career ==
In 1957, he joined the Washington Star as an investigative reporter. In 1964, he and fellow Star reporter Paul B. Hope were given the Raymond Clapper Memorial Award "for their work on the Baker case, which was presented to them during an awards dinner in Washington, by guest speaker Alfred Hitchcock."

In 1965, Barron joined the Washington bureau of Reader's Digest. There he wrote more than 100 stories on a wide variety of subjects—notably a 1980 story concerning unanswered questions surrounding the drowning death of Mary Jo Kopechne at Chappaquiddick in a car driven by Ted Kennedy.

After Barron published his 1974 book KGB: The Secret Work of Soviet Secret Agents, the KGB attempted to discredit him by faking claims that Barron was part of a Zionist conspiracy as well as "...made much of his Jewish origins...". In 1996, Barron published a book detailing the saga of the Federal Bureau of Investigation's Operation SOLO, involving the infiltration of the top leadership of the Communist Party USA by the FBI's secret informant Morris Childs. From 1958 through 1977, Childs traveled to Moscow over 50 times, acting as a courier between the CPUSA and Communist Party of the Soviet Union. Childs was instrumental in helping with the transfer of over $28 million from the Communist Party of the Soviet Union to the Communist Party of the US to help fund its activities, with each transaction painstakingly reported by Childs to his FBI handlers.

Barron's and co-author Anthony Paul's 1977 book Murder of a Gentle Land: The Untold Story of Communist Genocide in Cambodia was important in overturning the Cambodian genocide denial and the myth that the Khmer Rouge rulers of Cambodia were benign agrarian reformers.

== Death and legacy ==
John Barron died in Virginia on February 24, 2005. He was 75 years old at the time of his death.

Barron's papers are held by the Hoover Institution Archives at Stanford University in Palo Alto, California.

== Works ==
- KGB: The Secret Work of Soviet Secret Agents. New York: Reader's Digest Press, 1974. London: Hodder & Stoughton, 1974. [pb] New York: Bantam Books, 1974.
- Murder of a gentle land: the untold story of a Communist genocide in Cambodia, Authors John Barron, Anthony Paul, Reader's Digest Press, 1977.
- MiG Pilot: The Final Escape of Lieutenant Belenko, New York: McGraw-Hill, 1980.
- "The KGB's Magical War for 'Peace'" in Ernest W. Lefever and E. Stephen Hunt (eds.), The Apocalyptic Premise: Nuclear Arms Debated: Thirty-one Essays by Statesmen, Scholars, Religious Leaders, and Journalists. Lanham, MD: Rowman and Littlefield, 1982.
- KGB Today: The Hidden Hand. New York: Berkley Books, 1983.
- Breaking the Ring: The Bizarre Case of the Walker Family Spy Ring, John Anthony Walker. Boston: Houghton Mifflin, 1987.
- Operation SOLO: The FBI's Man in the Kremlin, Washington, DC: Regnery, 1996.

== See also ==
- Morris Childs
- Cambodian genocide denial
