= March 1974 =

Month of 1974

<<	March 1974					>>
Su	Mo	Tu	We	Th	Fr	Sa
					1	2
3	4	5	6	7	8	9
10	11	12	13	14	15	16
17	18	19	20	21	22	23
24	25	26	27	28	29	30
31

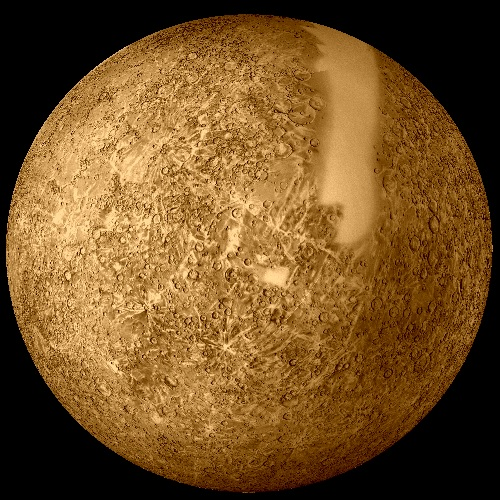
March 29, 1974: Mariner 10 becomes first Earth spacecraft to reach the planet Mercury (composite photo made from Mariner 10 data)

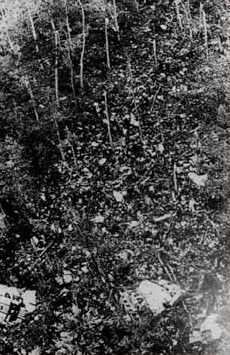
March 3, 1974: All 346 people aboard Turkish Airlines Flight 981 are killed when DC-10 crashes into forest near Paris

The following events occurred in March 1974:

== March 1, 1974 (Friday) ==
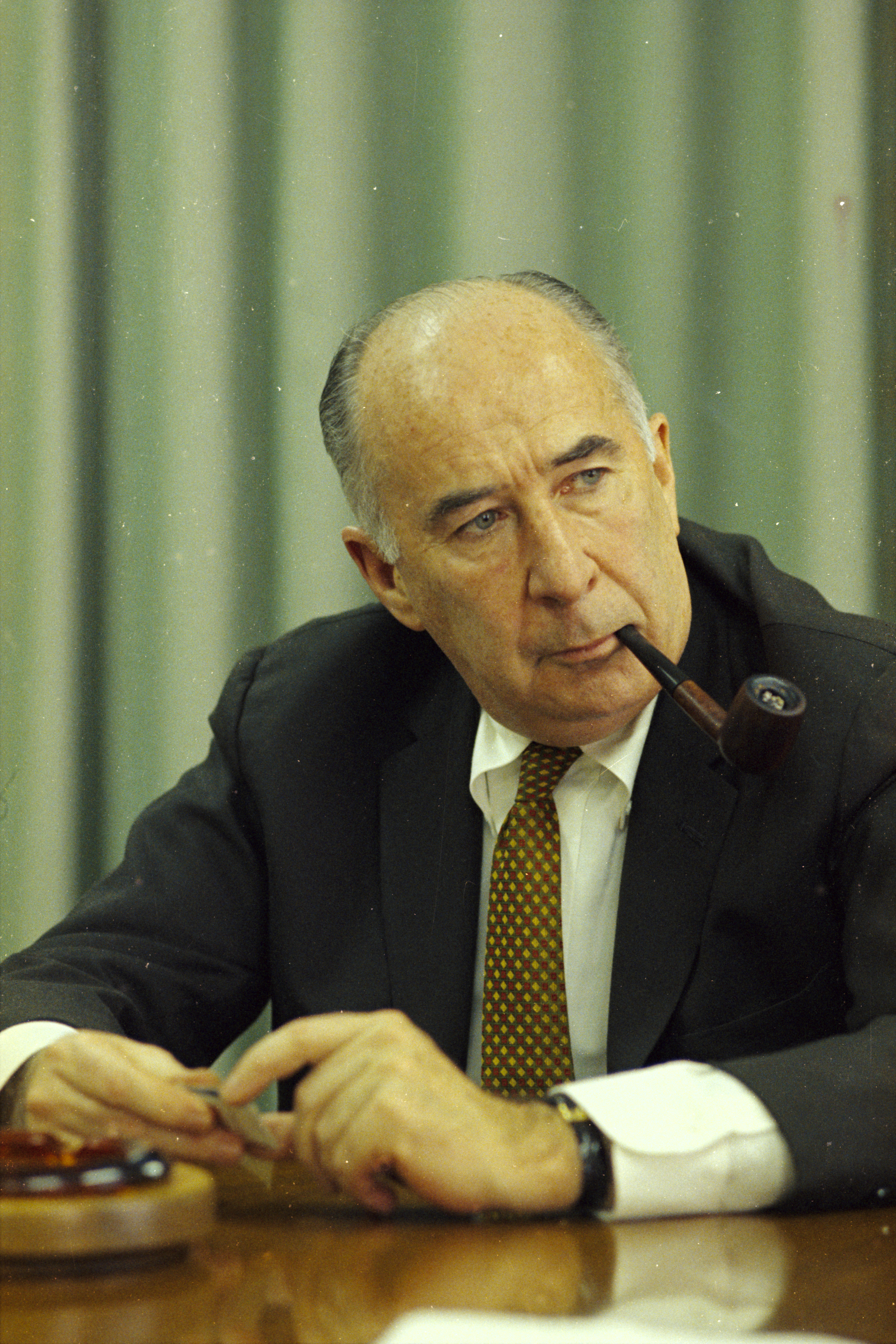
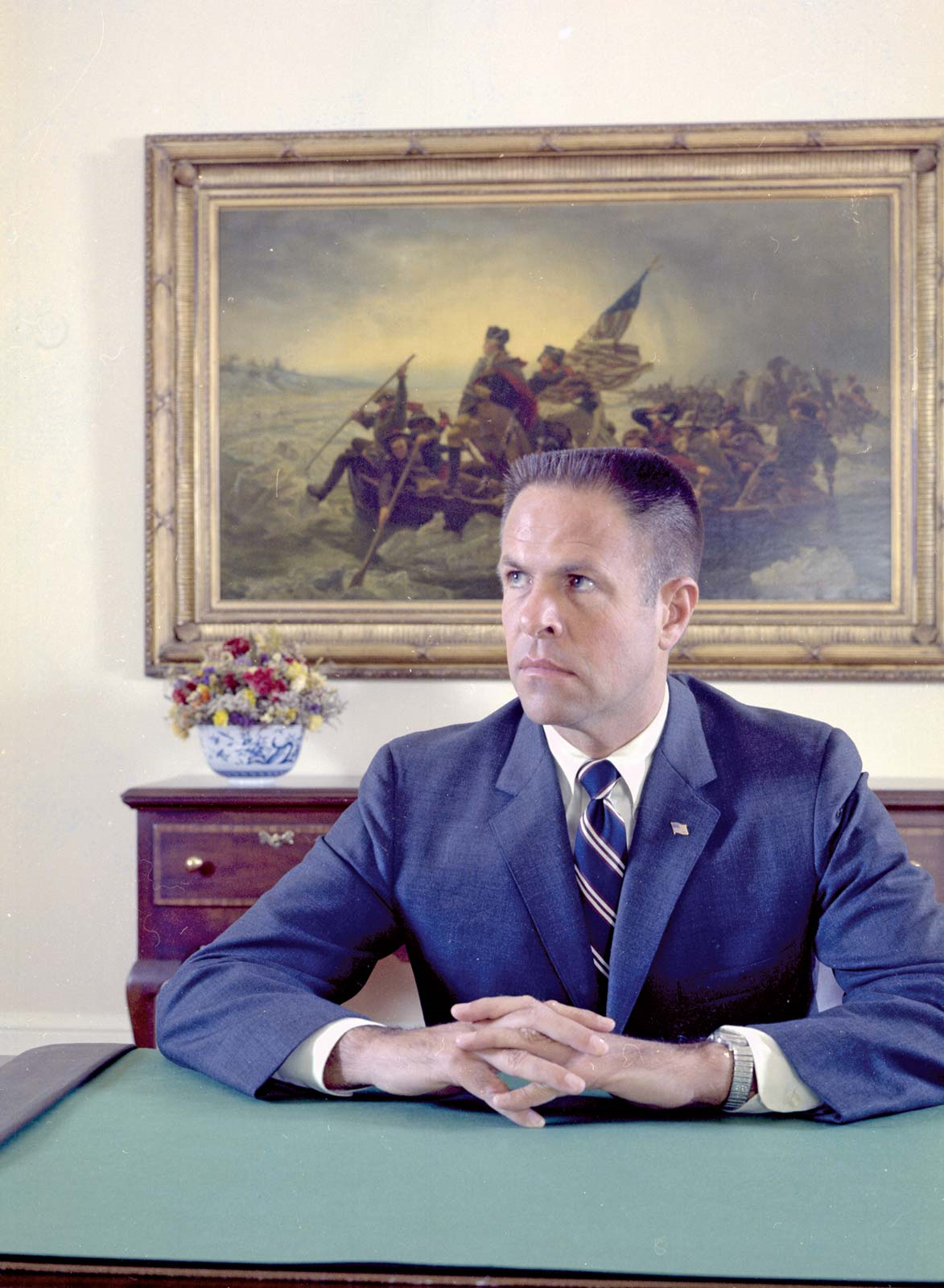
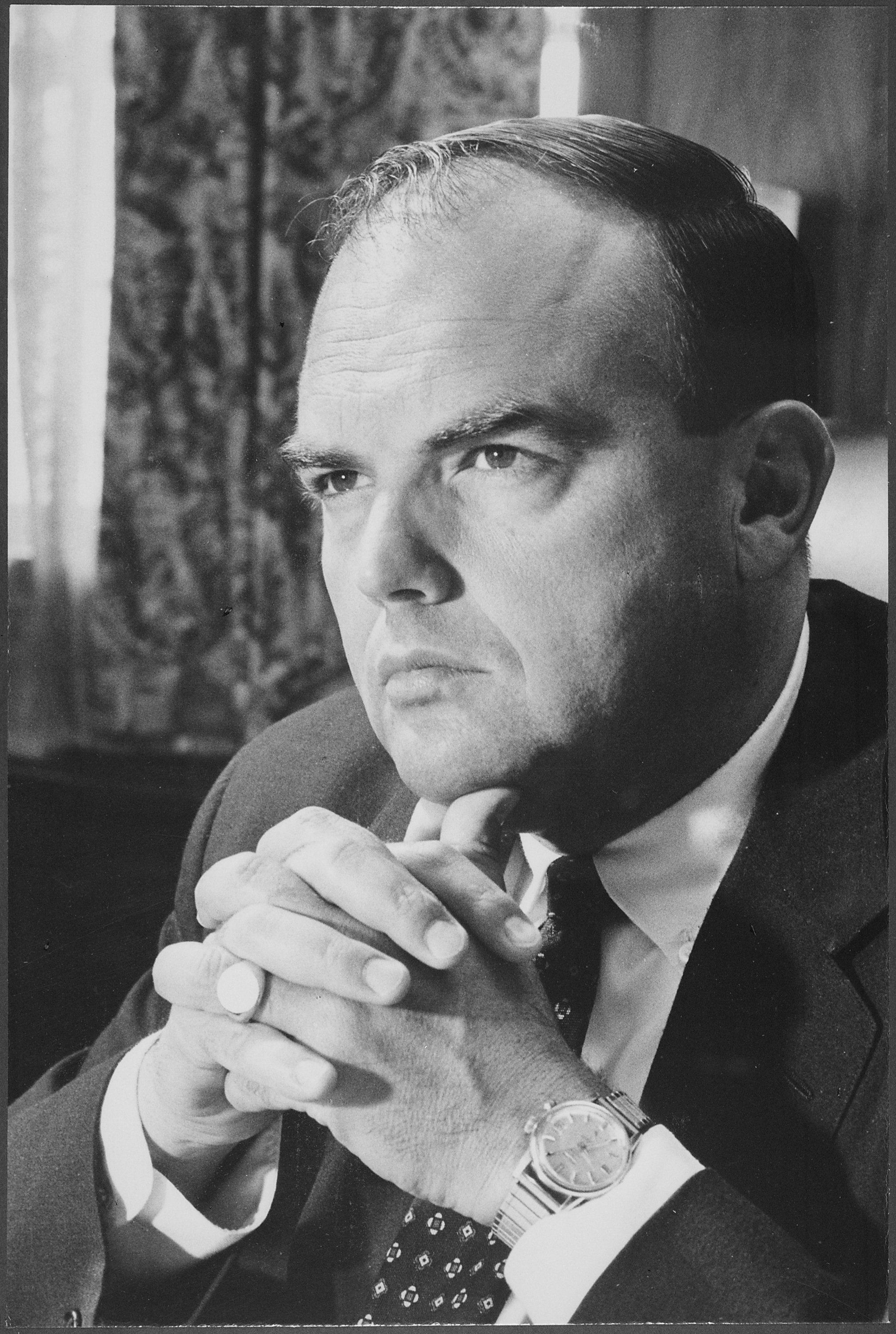
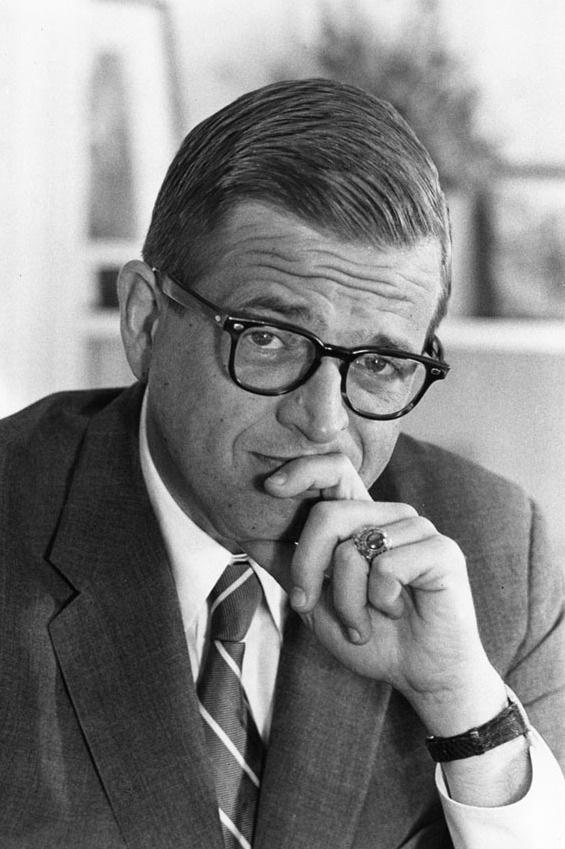
March 1, 1974: Grand jury indicts former presidential aides Mitchell, Haldeman, Ehrlichman, and Colson
- Seven former high-ranking aides to U.S. President Richard M. Nixon were indicted by a federal grand jury in Washington. The grand jury declined to name any persons believed to be connected, but not indicted, issuing the list as a secret report for a federal judge's consideration, but in June, President Nixon himself would be identified as one of the persons who had been named by the grand jury on March 1 as an unindicted co-conspirator. The former White House staffers charged with conspiracy to violate election laws were U.S. Attorney General John N. Mitchell; White House Chief of Staff H. R. Haldeman; domestic affairs advisor John Ehrlichman; White House counsel Charles Colson; and aides Gordon C. Strachan, Robert Mardian and Kenneth Parkinson. Mitchell, Haldeman, Ehrlichman and Colson would serve prison sentences ranging from seven to 19 months.
- Endalkachew Makonnen took office as the new Prime Minister of Ethiopia, two days after he and 18 other cabinet members had resigned (including Prime Minister Aklilu Habte-Wold) and gone into hiding. Endalkachew called a press conference and promised reforms, stating also that he had the support of the Ethiopian Army.
- Queen Elizabeth II interrupted her trip to Australia and flew back to London in order to meet with Prime Minister Edward Heath, whose Conservative Party had lost its majority in the February 28 elections. Heath told the Queen that he was confident that he could assemble a coalition to form a minority government.
- Born:
  - Hiroyasu Shimizu, Japanese speed skater, 1998 Olympic gold medalist and winner of five world championships in the 500 metre race; in Obihiro, Hokkaido island
  - Julie Andrieu, French food critic and host of multiple cooking shows on television; in Neuilly-sur-Seine, Paris
  - Rogelio González Pizaña, Mexican drug lord with the alias "El Kelin", co-founder of Los Zetas paramilitary and criminal organization; in Mexico (murdered 2015)
- Died:
  - Larry Doyle, 87, American Major League Baseball second baseman who was selected as the Most Valuable Player in the National League in 1912;
  - Bobby Timmons, 38, American jazz pianist and composer, died of cirrhosis of the liver.

== March 2, 1974 (Saturday) ==
- A U.S. Army soldier, Spec. 5 William A. Thompson Jr, stole a 50-ton M60 tank from the Turner Barracks in West Berlin and drove it through the Checkpoint Charlie border crossing and into Communist East Berlin, then caused chaos over the next 70 minutes, swiveling the turret and its 105mm cannon toward East German and Soviet troops. Thompson drove to the Drewitz checkpoint on the East Berlin side, where the Russians permitted his commanding officer, Captain Thomas Grace, and two other people to cross the border to persuade Thompson to surrender. Another soldier then drove the M60 tank back to West Germany and Thompson was led back across the border in handcuffs.
- In England, Wolverhampton Wanderers F.C. defeated Manchester City F.C., 2 to 1, to win the Football League Cup, after John Richards scored the winning goal in the 85th minute before a crowd of 97,886 spectators at Wembley Stadium in London. Wolverhampton would finish 12th in the League's First Division and Manchester City in 14th place, while eventual champion Leeds United F.C. had been knocked out on October 8 in its first game of the Football League tournament.
- The National Socialist Liberation Front, a U.S. neo-Nazi paramilitary organization, was founded by Joseph Tommasi and 42 other former members of the white supremacist National Socialist White People's Party.
- Died: Salvador Puig Antich, 25, Catalan anarchist who had been convicted of killing a Spanish police officer, was executed in Madrid by being strangled with the garrote in a prison in Barcelona. A fellow convict, Heinz Chez, was put to death in the same manner. Puig and Chez were the last convicts to be legally executed by the garrote method.

== March 3, 1974 (Sunday) ==
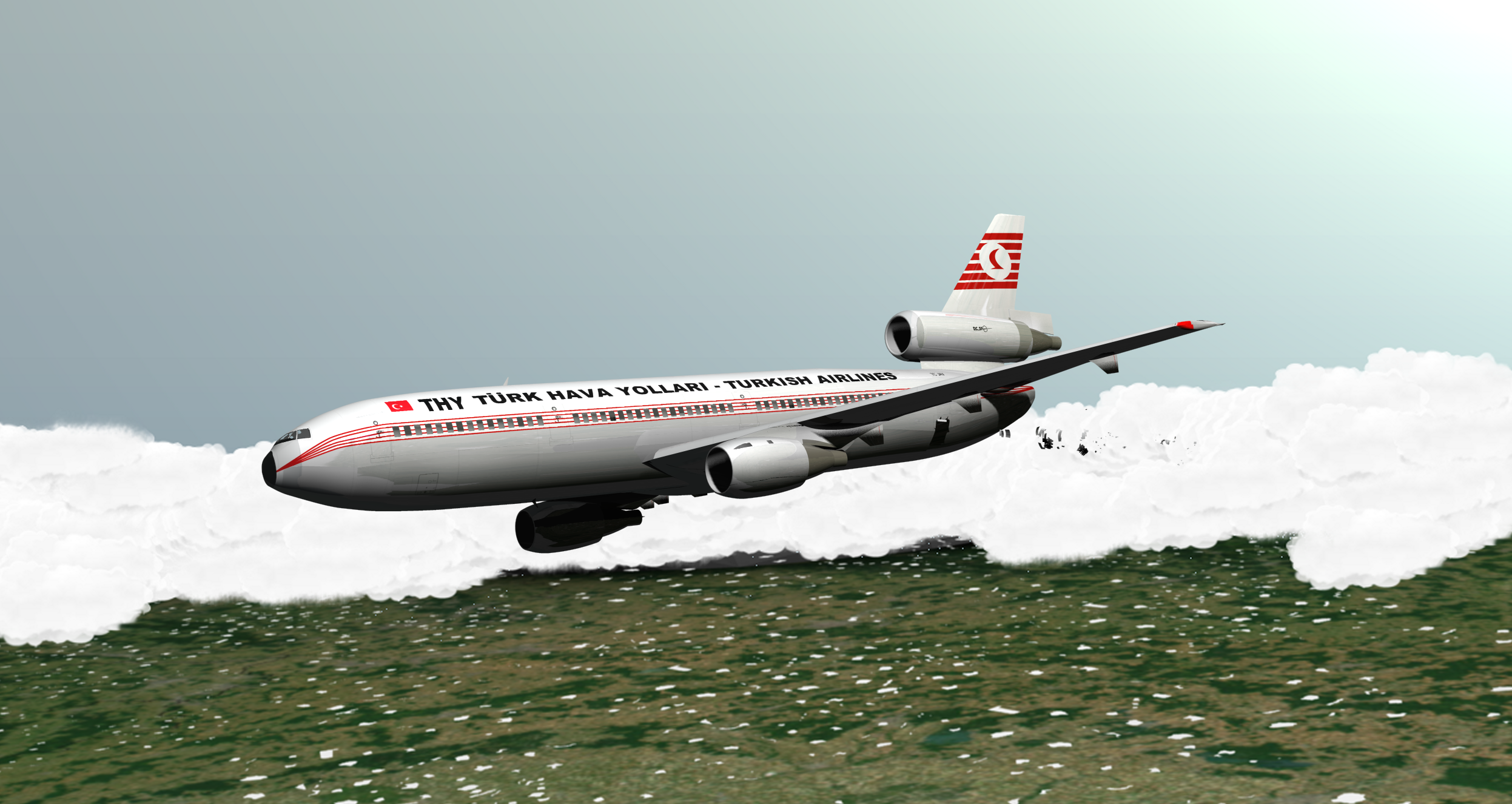
CGI rendering of the crash of Turkish Airlines Flight 981

- At 12:41 in the afternoon local time, Turkish Airlines Flight 981 crashed in the woods near the Paris suburb of Ermenonville in France, killing all 346 people aboard. The DC-10 departed from Orly Airport in Paris at 12:30 on its flight to London, and experienced an explosive decompression at an altitude of almost 23,000 feet (7,000 m), blowing off the rear cargo door and sending six passengers to their deaths in a field near Saint-Pathus. The cables controlling the aircraft's elevators and rudder were severed. The aircraft crashed into the forest 77 seconds after the explosion, at a speed of 487 miles per hour (784 km/h).
- The first episode of the science show Nova was broadcast on television as a production of WGBH-TV in Boston.
- Voting for President was held in Guatemala as well as for the 60-seat Congreso de la República. None of the three candidates for president— Kjell Laugerud, Efraín Ríos Montt or Ernesto Paíz Novales— received 50% of the vote, although Laugerud had 44% and was ultimately selected by 38 of the members of the Congreso, with 2 for Rios Montt and 15 abstaining.
- Two hijackers, armed with guns and hand grenades, took control of a British Airways flight 90 minutes after the VC-10 departed from Beirut en route to London. Officials at Schiphol Airport in Amsterdam allowed the airplane to land, and the hijackers unexpectedly ordered the 92 passengers and 10 crew to leave down emergency slides. After the aircraft was clear, the two men, who claimed they were from the "Palestinian Liberation Army", set fire to the jet, slid down the slide and were arrested by local police. The VC-10 was completely destroyed. The hijackers said later that before that they had boarded, other accomplices had hidden firearms and explosives on the aircraft and instructed the two men where to sit.
- Born:
  - Kelly Lytle Hernández, American historian and MacArthur Fellowship grantee; in San Diego
  - David Faustino, American TV actor best known as Bud Bundy on Married... with Children; in Los Angeles
- Died:
  - Frank Wilcox, 66, American character actor on film and TV
  - Alla Levashova, 55, Soviet fashion designer
  - Barbara Ruick, 41, American TV actress and singer, died of a ruptured cerebral aneurysm.
  - Jim Conway, 58, British trade unionist, was killed in the crash of Flight 981.
  - John Cooper, 33, British athlete and silver medalist in the 1964 Olympics in the 400m hurdles competition, was killed in the crash of Flight 981.

== March 4, 1974 (Monday) ==
- Following a hung parliament in the United Kingdom general election, and his inability to form a coalition with the Liberal Party, Conservative Prime Minister Edward Heath resigned. Labour's Harold Wilson, who had previously led the country from 1964 to 1970, was asked by the Queen to form a new government.

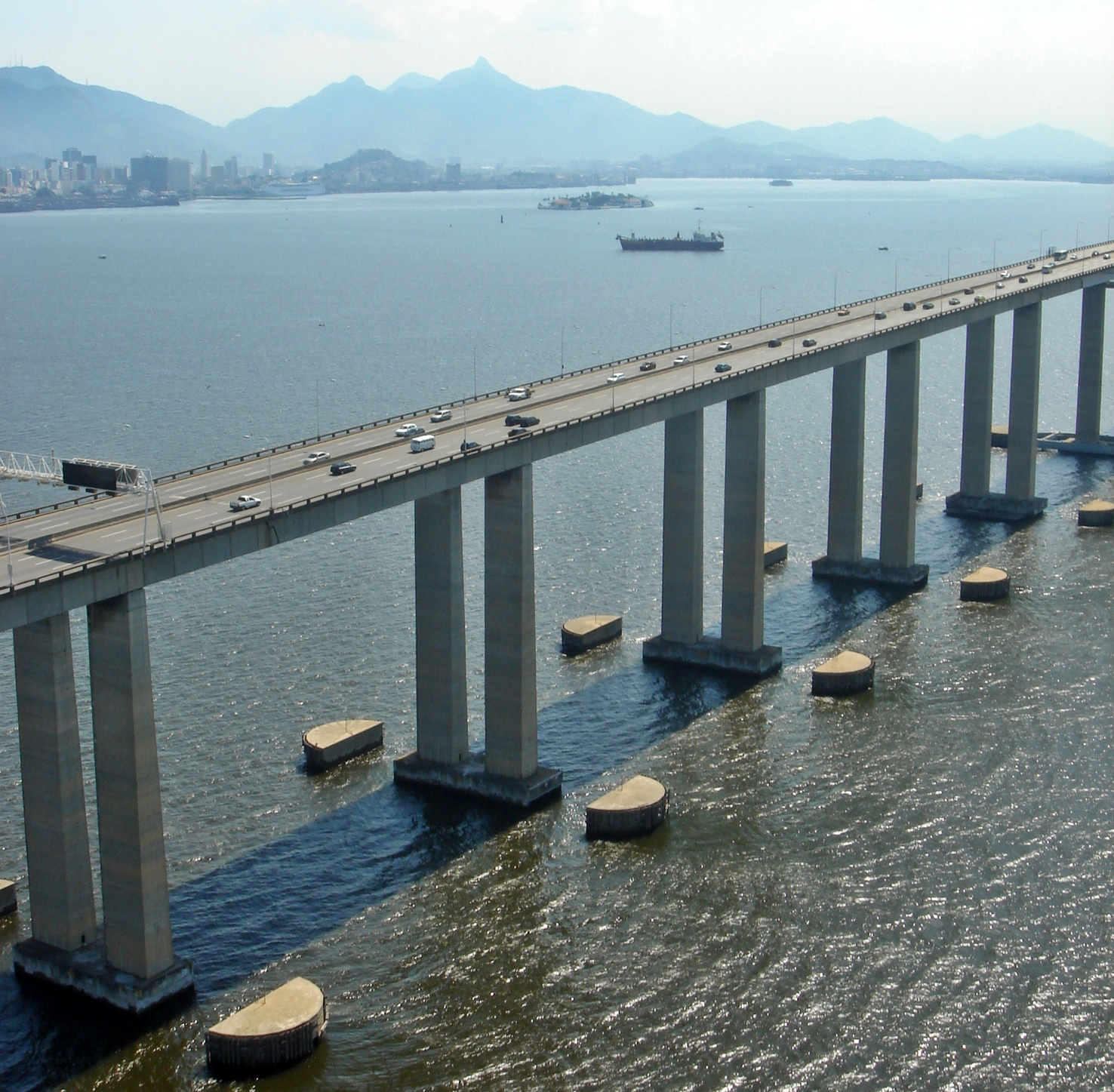
Six miles, six traffic lanes

- Brazil opened what was, at almost six miles in length— 13.29 kilometres (8.26 mi) — and wide enough at 27 metres (89 ft) for six lanes of traffic, the "biggest bridge in the world." The new Rio–Niterói Bridge (officially, the President Costa e Silva Bridge) after more than five years of construction at the loss of 33 lives.
- Israel completed the first phase of its withdrawal from the Sinai peninsula, pulling back eight miles to the Great Bitter Lake and giving Egypt control of both sides of the Suez Canal for the first time since the Six-Day War in June 1967. After Israel turned the territory over to the United Nations Emergency Force 24 hours ahead of schedule, Egyptian troops moved in at 6:00 in the morning local time.
- The post of U.S. Ambassador to the Soviet Union was filled for the first time in more than a year as career diplomat Walter J. Stoessel presented his credentials to Soviet head of state Nikolai V. Podgorny in Moscow.
- Born:
  - Kim Jung-eun, South Korean actress and producer, in Seoul
  - Ariel Ortega, Argentine footballer with 88 caps for the Argentina national team; in Libertador General San Martín, Jujuy Province
  - Priya Kumar, Indian novelist known also for her self-help books; in Chandigarh
- Died:
  - Adolph Gottlieb, 70, American abstract expressionist painter
  - Wongsonegoro (Raden Mas Soenardi), 78, Indonesian politician who served as Deputy Prime Minister of Indonesia 1953–1954, and previously as Minister of Justice and Governor of Central Java

== March 5, 1974 (Tuesday) ==
- Portugal's Prime Minister Marcello Caetano addressed the National Assembly in Lisbon and said that Portugal would continue the colonial status of Portuguese Guinea (now Guinea-Bissau), Angola and Mozambique despite the toll taken by guerrilla warfare in all three colonies. Caetano said that there were no plans to allow the natives to vote on self-determination because elections "would be inappropriate for the African mentality."
- Ethiopia's Emperor Haile Selassie pledged that he would bring a more democratic form of government to the absolute monarchy, as he made an unprecedented national address on radio and television. The pledged reform came too late to preserve the monarchy, as Selassie would be overthrown in a coup d'état on September 12.
- The Seagull, a three-act opera by Thomas Pasatieri, with libretto by Kenward Elmslie, premiered at the Houston Grand Opera. Based on an 1896 play of the same name by Anton Chekhov, the opera has been performed on multiple occasions since then.
- Born:
  - Eva Mendes, American film actress and model; in Miami
  - Jens Jeremies, German footballer with 55 appearances for the Germany National Team; in Görlitz, East Germany
  - Matt Lucas, British comedian and TV actor; in Paddington, London
  - Hiten Tejwani, Indian model and actor
- Died:
  - Sol Hurok, 85, Russian-born American impresario known for his influence on American culture by bringing major presentations to the stage in his "S. Hurok Presents" program
  - Billy De Wolfe (stage name for William Andrew Jones), 67, American film and stage comedian and actor
  - Judd Holdren, 58, American actor in science fiction films, known as the title characters in Captain Video: Master of the Stratosphere and Commando Cody: Sky Marshal of the Universe, committed suicide by shooting himself.
  - Wally Kinnear, 93, Scottish rower and 1912 Olympic gold medalist in single scull rowing

== March 6, 1974 (Wednesday) ==
- France's Prime Minister Pierre Messmer announced his government's decision to implement the Tout-nucléaire ("Total Nuclear") plan for all electricity in France to be generated by nuclear reactors by the year 2000. The plan, announced by Messmer in a televised speech, required no approval from parliament or debate, and construction began on the first three plants later in the year. By 1990, 56 reactors had been activated.
- The British coal strike came to an end as an agreement between the new government of Prime Minister Wilson and the National Union of Mineworkers (NUM) was approved by the NUM's executive board, 25 to 2. The new one-year agreement with the National Coal Board included weekly wage increases for all miners, and increased measures for mine safety.
- The government of North Vietnam returned the bodies of 12 U.S. servicemen who had died while held prisoner of war in Hanoi. The exchange took place at the Gia Lam airport in Hanoi, where two U.S. Air Force C-130 transports were allowed to land. Among the persons whose remains were returned was Lance Sijan, who had ejected from his disabled F-4 Phantom II on November 9, 1967, was severely injured, and died in the Hoa Lo Prison on January 22, 1968. U.S. Army First Lieutenant Sijan would be awarded the Medal of Honor posthumously on March 4, 1976.
- Mary Brooks, director of the United States Mint, unveiled the design of the bicentennial quarter and two other temporary redesigns for the Kennedy half dollar and the Eisenhower dollar, to be issued during 1976, the celebration year for the 200th anniversary of the U.S. Declaration of Independence. The winning design for the 1976 quarter was submitted by Jack L. Ahr while the 50 cent and one dollar coins were designed by Seth Huntington and Dennis R. Williams, respectively.
- Michael Ondoga, Uganda, became the latest casualty of the African nation's President Idi Amin when he was kidnapped by three men while dropping off his son and daughter at the Nakasera Primary School in Kampala. Ondoga's body was found two days later, floating in the Nile River.
- Born:
  - Anthony Carelli, Canadian professional wrestler; in Mississauga, Ontario
  - Cooper Manning, American TV host for Fox Sports, was born to New Orleans Saints quarterback Archie Manning; in New Orleans. Spinal stenosis prevented him from pursuing a football career after high school.
- Died: Ernest Becker, 49, American anthropologist and writer, died of colon cancer nine weeks after the release of his Pulitzer prize winning book The Denial of Death

== March 7, 1974 (Thursday) ==
- Eric Varley, the United Kingdom's new Secretary of State for Energy, announced the end of the three-day work week that had been implemented at the beginning of the year.
- An oceanographer at Duke University in the U.S. announced confirmation at in Durham, North Carolina, that the American warship USS Monitor had been located on August 27, almost 111 years after it sank (on December 31, 1862) in the Atlantic off of Cape Hatteras and the state of North Carolina.
- For the first time in the history of the "Miss World" beauty pageant, the reigning titleholder was dismissed. Marjorie Wallace of the U.S. had been crowned Miss World on November 23, 1973, but failed to abide by the pageant organizer's requirement of maintaining "a first-classic public image" by having multiple celebrity boyfriends.
- Born:
  - Jenna Fischer, American TV actress best known for The Office for eight seasons; in Fort Wayne, Indiana
  - Antonio de la Rúa, Argentine lawyer, co-founder of the ALAS Foundation and presidential advisor; in Córdoba
- Died: Lewis W. Douglas, 79, U.S. Ambassador to Great Britain 1947 to 1950, and former director of the U.S. Bureau of the Budget, 1933 to 1934

== March 8, 1974 (Friday) ==
- A Pathet Lao Airlines Antonov An-24, carrying 15 Algerian journalists who were covering the southeast Asian tour by Algeria's President Houari Boumedienne, along with the plane's 3-man crew, crashed during its approach to a scheduled landing in Hanoi, killing everyone aboard. A cause for the accident was not determined. The Algerian government delegation arrived safely in North Vietnam on a separate aircraft.
- The U.S. television sitcom The Brady Bunch ended its five-season run after the broadcast of its 117th and final original episode before entering re-runs. Since the ABC network had not yet announced its 1974-75 schedule, the season closer was a regular episode. ABC canceled the show on April 24.
- Died: Martha Wentworth, 84, American actress

== March 9, 1974 (Saturday) ==
- In South Vietnam, a mortar shell fired by the Viet Cong, killed 23 young students, ranging from 8 to 12 years old, at an elementary school playground at Cai Lay. The Viet Cong had apparently been aiming at a nearby military compound and had missed. Another nine children died of their injuries after being hospitalized.
- The Soviet Union's Mars 7 lander was released behind schedule during the Mars 7 flyby when it initially failed to separate from the probe. Because of a retrorocket failure, the probe skipped off of the atmosphere of Mars and flew past rather than landing, and came no closer than 810 miles (1,300 km) from the surface before hurtling back into space.
- In a quarter-final match in England's FA Cup competition, visiting Nottingham Forest led against host Newcastle United, 3 to 1, when the game had to be halted as hundreds of football hooligans invaded the pitch Newcastle. After play resumed, Newcastle United won, 4 to 3, but the result was declared void.
- Born:
  - Armen Nazaryan, Armenian Greco-Roman wrestler, Olympic gold medalist 1996 and 2000 and three time world champion in 2002, 2003 and 2005; in Masis, Armenia SSR, Soviet Union
  - Nalbert Bitencourt, Brazilian volleyball player, winner of the Prêmio Brasil Olímpico for the year's best athlete in 2001 and 2002; in Rio de Janeiro.
  - Yuriy Bilonoh, Ukrainian shot putter who won a gold medal in the 2004 Summer Olympics but had it withdrawn in 2012 because of his use of performance-enhancing drugs; in Bilopillia, Ukrainian SSR, Soviet Union
- Died:
  - Earl W. Sutherland, 58, American physiologist, Nobel Prize laureate, died after undergoing surgery for internal bleeding.
  - Harry Womack, 28, American R&B musician for The Valentinos, was stabbed to death by his girlfriend, Patricia Wilson, after a misunderstanding.

== March 10, 1974 (Sunday) ==
- Elections were held in Belgium for all 212 seats in the Chamber of Representatives. The new Belgian Socialist Party of Prime Minister Edmond Leburton won the plurality of seats, with 59, after gaining 34 since the 1971 vote, while the Christian People's Party of former Prime Minister Leo Tindemans finished with 50. The two parties tied with 27 seats each of the 106-seat Belgian Senate.
- Voting was held in El Salvador for the 56 seats of the national assembly, as well as for mayors of the Central American nation's 261 municipalities.
- In Israel, members of the Knesset approved a motion of confidence in the new coalition cabinet that had been formed by Prime Minister Golda Meir, with a margin of 62 to 46 in favor, and nine abstentions.
- Britain's 280,000 coal mine workers began their return to work after ratification of a new pay package, starting with the night shift at 11:00.

== March 11, 1974 (Monday) ==
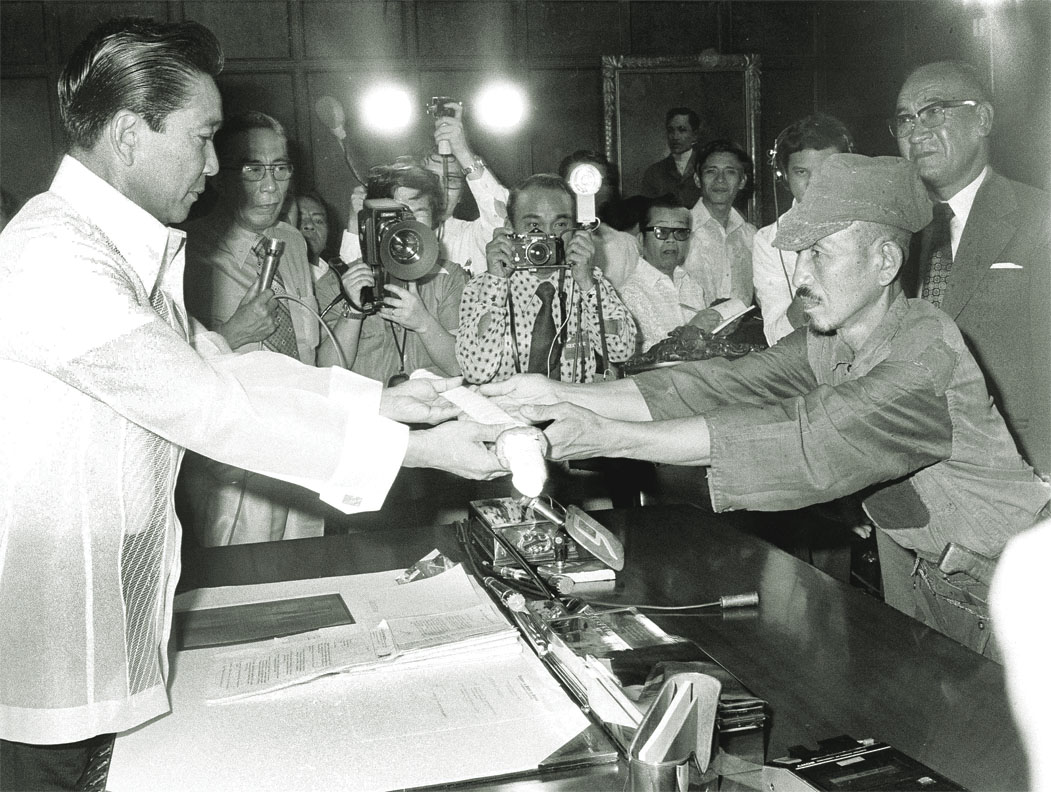
Japanese Army 2nd Lt. Onoda surrendering to Philippine President Marcos

- Imperial Japanese Army second lieutenant Hiroo Onoda formally surrendered after having continued to carry out his orders in World War II to fight in the Philippines for 29 years. Onoda was informed by his former commanding officer, Major Yoshimi Taniguchi, that the War had been over since 1945, and presented his battle sword to Philippine President Ferdinand Marcos.
- Iraq's government gave 15-day ultimatum to Mustafa Barzani, leader of the Kurdistan Democratic Party of Iraq, to accept an offer of an autonomous Kurdish region or to face a renewal of the hostilities arising since the end of the First Iraqi–Kurdish War in 1970. The declaration that was issued provided that the Kurdish people would have an autonomous legislature and executive, with control over their judiciary system and their budgeting. In that the offer of autonomy fell short of what had been promised in 1970 to end the war, Barzani would let the deadline expire on March 26 and a second war would begin in April.
- The United Kingdom formally ended the state of emergency that had been proclaimed in November in response to the energy crisis.
- Free to Be... You and Me, the groundbreaking television incarnation of the then Gold Record Award recipient children's album of the same name, premiered on ABC-TV.
- Born:
  - Jonathan Dunnett, English-born windsurfer and adventurer; in London
  - Sven Šestak, Croatian stage and TV actor; in Koprivnica, SR Croatia, Yugoslavia

== March 12, 1974 (Tuesday) ==
- The Soviet Mars 6 space probe, one of two explorers launched in 1973, entered the Martian atmosphere at 9:05 UTC and, after its descent was slowed by a parachute, returned data to Earth for 3 minutes and 44 seconds, although most of what was transmitted was unusable because of the deterioration of a computer chip. At 9:11 UTC, seconds before retrorockets were to fire to allow a soft landing, all contact with Mars 6 was lost and the probe crashed on Mars at a speed of 61 meters per second, equivalent to 136 miles (219 km) per hour.
- The Congress of Guatemala voted to proclaim General Kjell Laugerud Garcia the winner of the March 3 presidential election in which neither he, nor challenger Efrain Rios Montt, had won a majority.
- Carlos Andres Perez was inaugurated to a five-year term as the 40th President of Venezuela, succeeding Rafael Caldera.
- Born:
  - Yash A Patnaik, Indian television and film producer; in Bhubaneswar, Orissa state (now Odisha)
  - Marko Bošnjak, Slovenian judge of the European Court of Human Rights, the court's vice president since 1922; in Ljubljana, SR Slovenia, Yugoslavia
- Died:
  - Lis Groes, 63, Danish politician and the first woman to serve as the Danish Minister for Trade and Industry (from 1953 to 1957), later the leader of the Dansk Kvindesamfund women's rights organization, 1958 to 1964.
  - Nikolay Korolyov, 56, Soviet Russian boxer, USSR heavyweight boxing champion between 1936 and 1953
  - Brigadier General Alberto Bachelet, 50, Chilean Air Force officer who opposed the 1973 Chilean coup d'état, died of a heart attack while imprisoned in Santiago. In 2006, his daughter Michelle Bachelet, who was 22 at the time of his death, would become the first woman s President of Chile.
  - Billy Fox, 35, Senator for Ireland's Seanad Éireann, was murdered by five gunmen of the Provisional Irish Republican Army while he was visiting his girlfriend's home in Clones, County Monaghan.

== March 13, 1974 (Wednesday) ==
- All 36 people on Sierra Pacific Airlines Flight 802 chartered aircraft were killed in the crash of the Convair 440 airplane. Of the passengers, 31 were employees of Wolper Productions, working on the documentary Primal Man. At 8:24 p.m., the Convair 440 crashed into a foothill in the White Mountains at 6,100 feet (1,900 m), four minutes after takeoff from Bishop, California and were on their way back to Burbank.
- At a meeting of representatives of the Arab nations OPEC, the nine OAPEC members agreed to lift the embargo against the U.S. for two months and restore full production, which had been reduced in October after U.S. support of Israel in the Yom Kippur War.
- Prime Minister Liam Cosgrave of the Republic of Ireland announced that the Irish Republic recognized that Northern Ireland was part of the UK and not a part of the Republic of Ireland. Cosgrave told the parliament, "The factual position of Northern Ireland is that it is within the United Kingdom and my government accepts this as a fact." The declaration was made in an effort to stop the ongoing violence in Ireland as a whole.
- The Union of Arab Banks was founded as a cooperative network for banks in Lebanon, Egypt, Sudan and Jordan.
- Meeting in Athens, scientists from 13 nations on the Mediterranean Sea warned that the vast body of water between Europe and Africa would "become a dead sea" by 2004 if measures were not taken to reduce water pollution.
- Born: Vampeta (Marcos André Batista dos Santos), Brazilian footballer with 39 caps for the Brazil national team; in Nazaré das Farinhas

== March 14, 1974 (Thursday) ==
- Portuguese Army generals Francisco da Costa Gomes and António de Spínola refused to attend a ceremony in Lisbon where more than 100 other senior military officers pledged their loyalty to the authoritarian government of Prime Minister Marcello Caetano. Both Costa Gomes and Spinola were fired four hours later. In April, the two men would lead the "Carnation Revolution" that would overthrow Caetano's Estado Novo regime and being the Portuguese transition to democracy.
- Pursuant to the Grundlagenvertrag, the treaty signed between West Germany and East Germany on December 21, 1972, representatives of the two nations signed the Protocol on the Establishment of Permanent Reperesentation, with each country to have a representative and staff in the other's capital. The Protokoll über die Einrichtung der Ständigen Vertretungen stopped short of establishing diplomatic relations, in that neither nation recognized the other as legitimate.
- Born: Grace Park, Canadian TV actress; in Los Angeles

== March 15, 1974 (Friday) ==
- Fifteen passengers on Sterling Airways Flight 901 burned to death and 37 others were injured when the SE-10 Caravelle jet caught fire while taxiing for departure from Tehran in Iran on a return trip to Copenhagen in Denmark. The airplane, chartered by the Tjæreborg travel agency, had stopped for refueling after a 12-day tour of Asia for 92 customers, mostly from Denmark and Sweden. After it departed from the gate, the jet sustained the collapse of the landing gear on the right side. The fuel line of the right wing was ruptured and ignited.
- Ernesto Geisel was inaugurated to a five-year term as the 29th President of Brazil, succeeding Emílio Garrastazu Médici, who had selected Geisel for certain approval by the National Congress.
- The 100 kilometres per hour (62 mph) speed limit that had been imposed on West Germany's autobahn traffic in October because of the energy crisis, expired on its own terms after the parliament rejected a proposal to set a limit of 140 kilometres per hour (87 mph).
- Born: Percy Montgomery, South African rugby union player with 102 caps for the Springboks, the national team; in Walvis Bay, South West Africa (now Walvisbaai, Namibia)

== March 16, 1974 (Saturday) ==
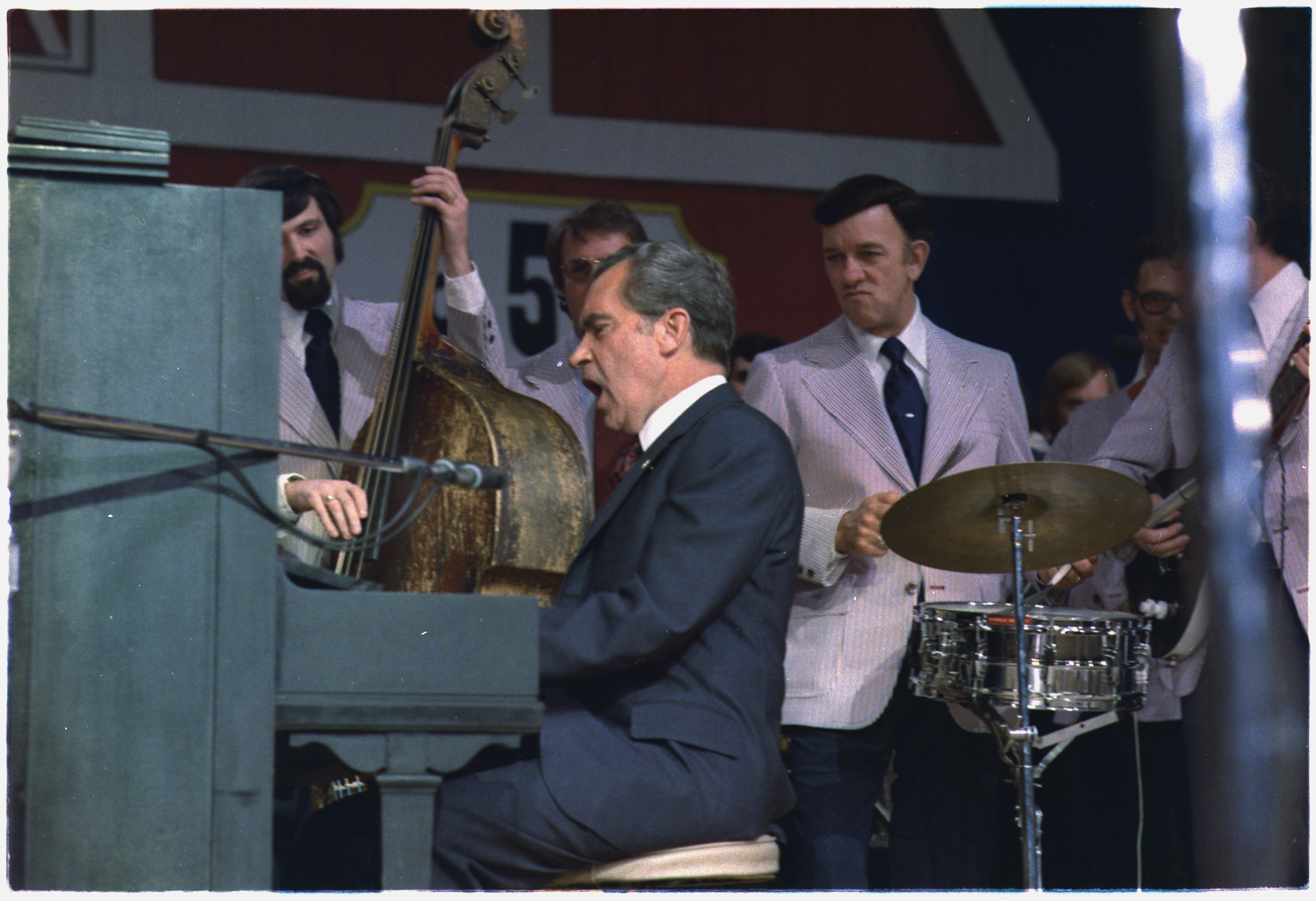
President Nixon performing at the Grand Ole Opry

- U.S. President Nixon last played the piano in public, as part of the dedication of the new Grand Ole Opry House in Nashville, on the grounds of Opryland USA. Nixon played the songs "Happy Birthday to You", followed by "My Wild Irish Rose" and "God Bless America". Previously, country music's Grand Ole Opry had been housed at Nashville's Ryman Auditorium.
- The Minnesota Golden Gophers of the University of Minnesota defeated Michigan Tech (the Huskies of Michigan Technological University), 4 to 2, to win the NCAA ice hockey championship.

== March 17, 1974 (Sunday) ==
- In Bangladesh, at least 50 protesters were killed when members of the JSD, a paramilitary force of supporters of Sheikh Mujibur Rahman fired into a crowd of people marched upon the house of Home Minister Mansur Ali.
- Born: Dorin Recean, Prime Minister of Moldova since 2023; in Dondușeni, Moldavian SSR, Soviet Union
- Died:
  - Louis Kahn (Itze-Leib Schmuilowsky), 73, Estonian-born American architect
  - Carroll Nye, 72, American film actor

== March 18, 1974 (Monday) ==
- The Organization of Arab Petroleum Exporting Countries (OAPEC), made up of Middle Eastern members of OPEC, formally ended the oil embargo declared by its members on October 17, 1973.
- The U.S. State Department announced that the U.S. and Britain would assist Egypt in clearing mines from the Suez Canal in order to reopen the waterway between the Indian Ocean and the Mediterranean Sea.
- The new World Football League (WFL) conducted a draft of NFL and Canadian League players whose contracts had expired or were set to expire at the end of the 1974 and 1975 seasons, with each of the 12 WFL teams making selections. Of the 12 first round picks, six—Larry Csonka, Tim Rossovich, Virgil Robinson, Mike Taylor, Pete Beathard, and Ted Kwalick— would play for WFL teams.
- Born: Anne Tønnessen, Norwegian women's footballer with 68 caps for the Norway women's national team that won the 2000 Summer Olympics competition; in Sokndal Municipality.

== March 19, 1974 (Tuesday) ==
- Republican U.S. Senator James L. Buckley became the first conservative Republican in Congress to call for the resignation of U.S. President Richard Nixon.
- Born:
  - Vida Guerra, Cuban born-American model and actress; in Havana
  - Helsi Herlinda, Indonesian TV actress and producer; in Jakarta
- Died:
  - Edward Platt, 58, American TV actor best known as "The Chief" on the television show Get Smart, died of a heart attack.
  - Anne Klein, 50, American fashion designer, died of breast cancer.

== March 20, 1974 (Wednesday) ==
- In London, an attempt was made to kidnap Princess Anne, daughter of Queen Elizabeth II, Ian Ball, later found by a court to be insane, drove his Ford Escort into the path of an automobile bringing Anne and her husband Mark Phillips back to Buckingham Palace after a charity event. Ball began firing a pistol and shot Anne's bodyguard Jim Beaton; chauffeur Alex Callender; and tabloid reporter Brian McConnell and police constable Michael Hills. A passing pedestrian, former boxer Ron Russell, punched Ball and led Anne to safety. The story would later be dramatized in a 2006 Granada Television film, To Kidnap a Princess.
- A resolution in the Soviet Union for the destruction of designated "unpromising villages" (neperspektivnyye derevni), and the relocation of their residents from rural locations to urban buildings, was approved by the Council of Ministers of the Soviet Union and the Party's Central Committee. Under the terms of the resolution, 143,000 settlements in the U.S.S.R. were identified as being on land that could not be farmed, and 114,000 of those were to be liquidated. The 170,000 families in the "unpromising" locations were to be relocated to comfortable settlements on collective farms with apartment buildings for residents.
- Ugandan dictator Idi Amin ended the hijacking of an East African Airways airliner by talking to a gunman and his wife, and persuading them to surrender, while passengers watched. The Fokker Friendship plane had been carrying 33 other people in Kenya on a flight from Nairobi to Mombasa when the Ethiopian couple forced the pilot to fly to Kampala. A Dutch businessman aboard told reporters, "The president strode up to the cockpit of the plane and began talking with the Ethiopian at pistol point about an hour after we landed at Entebbe Airport. The gunman then threw his pistol from the plane onto the tarmac and he and his wife surrendered to the president," and added "Amin treated the hijackers like kings and seemed to be enjoying it."
- Born: Carsten Ramelow, German footballer with 46 caps for the Germany national team; in West Berlin, West Germany
- Died: Chet Huntley, 62, American journalist and anchor of NBC's Huntley–Brinkley Report from 1956 to 1970, died of lung cancer.

== March 21, 1974 (Thursday) ==
- In Canada, a group of union workers from the Quebec Federation of Labour (FLQ) caused $35,000,000 in damage to the LG-2 (La Grande River) site of the James Bay Project for hydroelectric power. The destruction included using bulldozers to destroy the site and setting buildings on fire. The act came at the direction of FLQ vice president André Desjardins, after a subcontractor had refused to fire two workers belonging to a rival union, the Confédération des syndicats nationaux (CSN).
- Born: Nikolay Tsekhomsky, Russian financier, chairman of the board of Barclays Bank Russia; in Leningrad (now Saint Petersburg), Russian SFSR, Soviet Union
- Died: Candy Darling, 29, American transgender actress, died of lymphoma.

== March 22, 1974 (Friday) ==
- John Patterson, an American diplomat who was the U.S. vice consul to Hermosillo in Mexico, was kidnapped by an American visitor, Bobby Joe Keesee, who demanded a ransom of $250,000 in U.S. currency and no disclosure of the kidnapping to the news media. A ransom brought by Patterson's wife was not collected, and Patterson's badly-decomposed body would be found in the desert 345 miles (555 km) north of Hermosillo, on July 8, with a broken skull.
- The foreign ministers of all seven nations bordering the Baltic Sea— the Soviet Union, West Germany, East Germany, Poland, Sweden, Denmark and Finland— signed a treaty banning the dumping of solid waste into the body of water common to all of them, and to strictly control pollution from DDT and mercury.
- Born:
  - Marcus Camby, American NBA player, 2007 Defensive Player of the Year, 1996 college player of the year; in Hartford, Connecticut
  - Suma Kanakala (stage name for Pallassana Paachuveettil), Indian actress, game show host and producer known for Star Mahila; in Palakkad, Kerala state
  - Bassem Youssef, Egyptian comedian, host of the TV show Al Bernameg; in Cairo
  - Kidada Jones, American actress and fashion designer; in Los Angeles

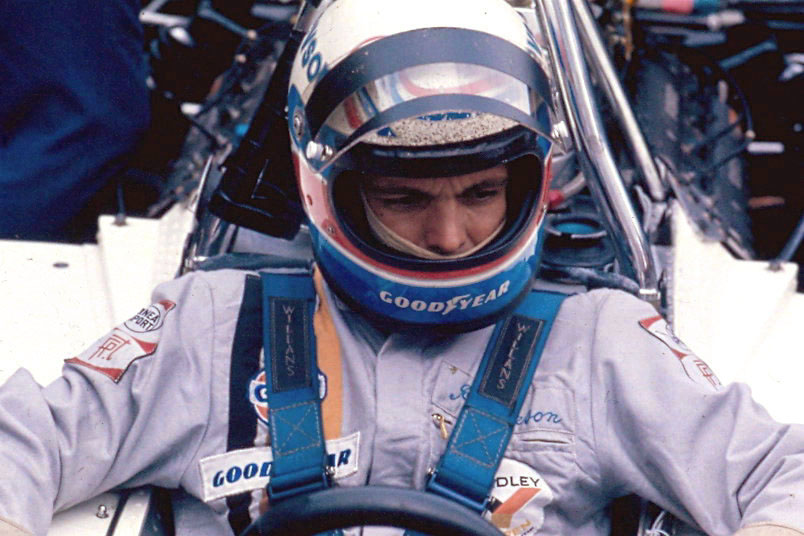
Revson in 1973

- Died:
  - Peter Revson, 35, American race car driver, was killed in a crash while preparing for the 1974 South African Grand Prix.
  - Sam Donahue, 56, American big band jazz saxophonist, died of pancreatic cancer.

== March 23, 1974 (Saturday) ==
- Brigadier General Charles Arube of the Ugandan Army began a rebellion at the Malire Barracks in Kampala, in an attempt to overthrow the government of dictator Idi Amin. Arube, and Lieutenant Colonel Elly Aseni, sought as well to rid the Ugandan armed forces of foreign mercenary officers. Although Arube's rebels were able to kill the 30 guards inside the presidential palace and to trap General Amin, the group hesitated at entering the command post to arrest Amin. General Arube entered the palace alone and was shot to death by General Amin.
- Eight people were killed and six critically injured in a fire that began after a man threw a gasoline can and lighted fuse into a crowded bar in Allentown, Pennsylvania. Ernest James Burton Jr. walked to a police station and turned himself in, 23 minutes after starting the fire. Burton had attacked the Caboose Bar after being ejected earlier in the day.
- "The Wall of Sound", the largest concert sound system up to that time, made its debut at the Grateful Dead's concert at the Cow Palace, near San Francisco. Designed by the band's sound engineer, Owsley Stanley, the Wall of Sound was composed of 604 total speakers with a combined 26,400 watts of power.
- The North Carolina State Wolfpack scored an upset over the heavily favored UCLA Bruins college basketball team in the semifinal of the NCAA tournament, and earned a trip to the national final. Prior to the loss, UCLA had won 38 tournament games in a row and seven consecutive national championships. After trailing by 11 points in the second half, N.C. State tied the score 65 to 65 in regular time, sending the game into overtime, then tied it again 67–67 to go into a second extra period. Trailing 74–67, N.C. State scored 13 points in the next three and a half minutes to win, 80 to 77, ending the Bruins' reign as champions.
- Born: Jaume Collet-Serra, Spanish-born American film director and producer known for Non-Stop; in Sant Iscle de Vallalta, Province of Barcelona
- Died: Edward Molyneux, 82, British fashion designer

== March 24, 1974 (Sunday) ==
Flag of Tanna

- The island of Tanna, southernmost of the New Hebrides islands, seceded from the rest of the jointly-administered Anglo-French Condominium" and was proclaimed by secessionists as the Republic of Tanna. The movement would be suppressed three months later by British and French troops. Tanna is now part of the Tafea province of Vanuatu.
- The last of 120,000 Bangladesh prisoners of war who had been imprisoned in Pakistan were repatriated as a flight brought 206 Bengalis from Karachi in Pakistan to Dhaka in Pakistan.
- All 32 people aboard a passenger bus in Pakistan were killed when the bus fell 1,500 feet (460 m) into a ravine while traveling downhill through the Malakand Pass toward Peshawar.
- Born: Alyson Hannigan, American film and TV actress known for How I Met Your Mother and Buffy the Vampire Slayer; in Washington D.C.
- Died: Hristo Iliev-Patrata, 37, Bulgarian footballer with 24 caps for the Bulgaria national team, was killed in a car accident.

== March 25, 1974 (Monday) ==
- The North Carolina State Wolfpack, who had lost only one game during the season, won the NCAA basketball championship with a 76 to 64 win over the Marquette University Warriors.

== March 26, 1974 (Tuesday) ==
- A group of peasant women in Chamoli district, Uttarakhand, India, surrounded individual trees to prevent loggers from felling them, giving rise to the Chipko movement and the practice of tree hugging as a means of environmental protection.
- In a much-anticipated boxing bout, challenger Ken Norton faced defending WBA and WBC champion George Foreman at the Poliedro de Caracas in Venezuela, with broadcast of the fight seen worldwide on closed-circuit television to paid customers. Norton, who had a record of 30 wins and 2 losses, went up against Foreman, who was unbeaten after 39 professional bouts. The fight itself was anticlimactic, with Norton being knocked down three times in the second round before referee Jimmy Rondeau called the fight and awarded Foreman a win by technical knockout (TKO).
- Born: Philippe Quint, Soviet-born American classical violinist; in Moscow.
- Died: Edward Condon, 72, American nuclear physicist

== March 27, 1974 (Wednesday) ==
- A collision killed 70 train passengers in Magude, in Portuguese Mozambique, at the time an African colony of Portugal. The southbound Rhodesian railway passenger train crashed into a stopped freight train that had been hauling tank cars of oil and gasoline.
- Mamadou Dia, the first Prime Minister of Senegal, who had been jailed since December 17, 1962, was pardoned by President Léopold Sédar Senghor, along with former Interior Minister Valdiodio N'diaye and Information Minister Ibrahima Sarr, and 14 other political prisoners. Dia, N'Diaye and Sarr had spent 11 years in prison after plotting to overthrow the government of the West African nation.
- Born:
  - Amar Neupane, Nepalese novelist; in Chitwan
  - Aram Margaryan, Armenian wrestler and 2002 60 kg world champion; in Yerevan, Armenian SSR, Soviet Union
- Died:
  - Eduardo Santos Montejo, 85, President of Colombia 1938 to 1942
  - Wilhelm Herget, 63, German fighter ace with 73 shootdowns during World War II, committed suicide.

== March 28, 1974 (Thursday) ==
- Flooding of the Tubarão River killed 199 people and left 45,000 others homeless in the Brazilian state of Santa Catarina, primarily in the city of Tubarão.
- The 369 members of the Great National Assembly of the Socialist Republic of Romania gave unanimous approval to the election of Nicolae Ceaușescu (who was already the General Secretary of the Romanian Communist Party and the Chairman of the 21-member Consiliul de Stat) to a five-year term in the newly created office of Primul Președinte al României, President of the Republic.
- The wife and three sons of exiled Soviet writer Alexander Solzhenitsyn were allowed to leave the Communist nation, one month after he had been arrested and sent into exile. The four family members were accompanied by Mrs. Solzhenitsyn's son from a previous marriage, and by her mother, on a Swissair flight from Moscow to Zurich.
- Born:
  - Sharon la Hechicera (stage name for Edith Bermeo Cisneros), Ecuadorian TV actress and singer; in Guayaquil (killed in traffic accident, 2015)
  - Daisuke Kishio, Japanese transsexual voice actress; in Matsusaka, Mie Prefecture
- Died:
  - H. E. Merritt, 74, British mechanical engineer and co-inventor of the Merritt–Brown triple differential tank transmission
  - Dorothy Fields, 69, American librettist and lyricist
  - Mary Strange Reeve, 83, English book illustrator

== March 29, 1974 (Friday) ==
- At 20:47 UTC, the Mariner 10 space probe, launched from the U.S. on November 9, made the closest approach to the planet Mercury up to that time by an Earth spacecraft, coming within 437 miles (703 km) of the surface.

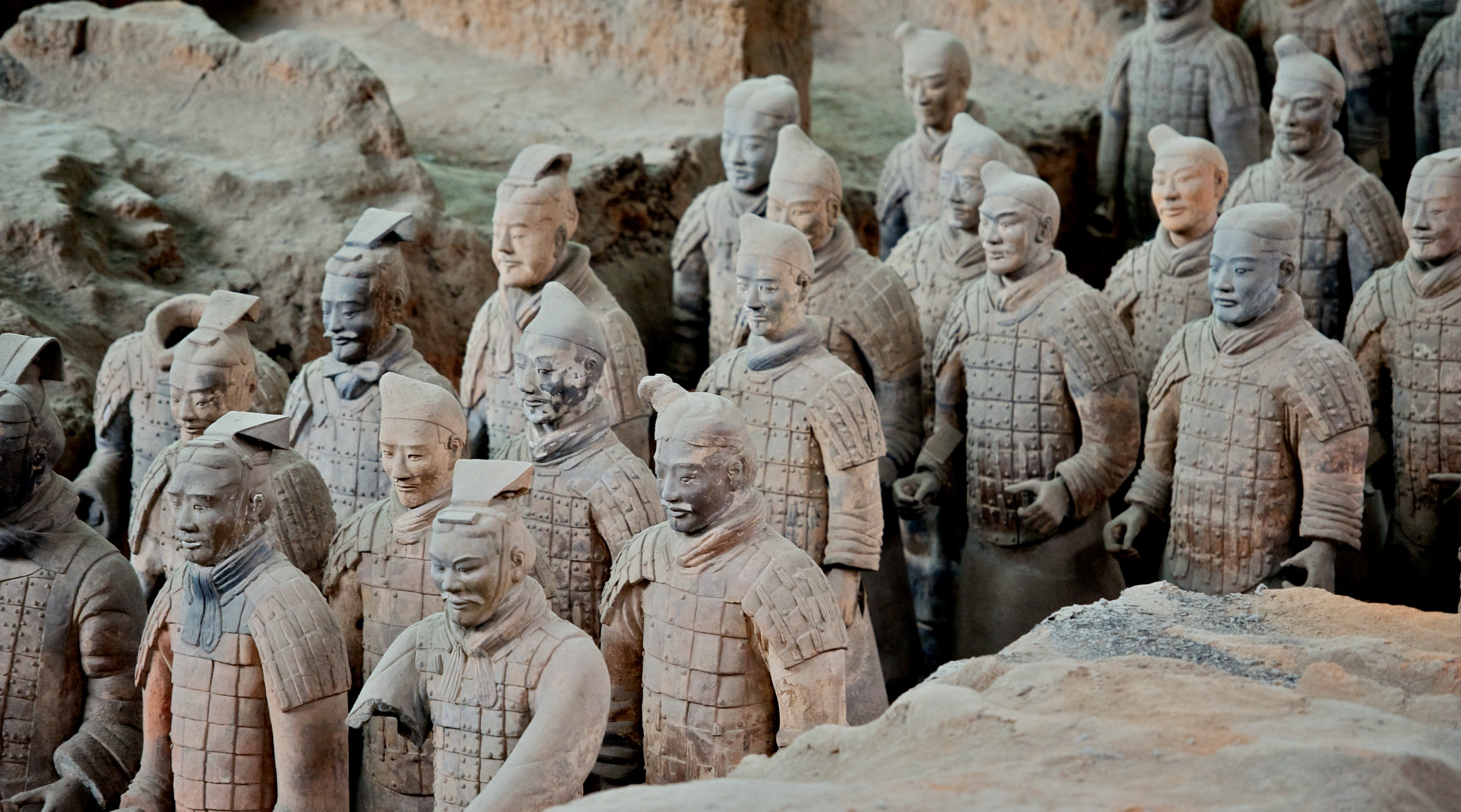
Part of the Terracotta Army in 2011

- The Terracotta Army of Qin Shi Huang was discovered at Xi'an, China.
- The United Kingdom restored the speed limit on its network of M-designated motorways to 70 miles per hour (110 km/h), after having reduced the maximum speed to 50 miles per hour (80 km/h) on December 8 because of the worldwide fuel shortage.
- A U.S. federal grand jury in Cleveland indicted eight members of the Ohio National Guard on civil rights violations for the May 4, 1970 shooting of 13 students at Kent State University, four of whom died of their wounds. Five of the defendants were charged with felonies. The indictments would all be dismissed on November 8 on a finding that the prosecution had failed to produce sufficient evidence to support charges.
- The Volkswagen Golf was launched in West Germany as a modern front-wheel drive hatchback with a goal of replace the iconic Volkswagen Beetle, holder of the world record for the car with the most units produced.
- Died:
  - Czesław Kukuczka, 38, Polish firefighter, entered Poland's embassy in East Berlin and threatened to detonate a bomb unless he could receive a visa allowing him to pass through an East German border crossing into West Berlin. Kukuczka was given the travel documents and driven to the crossing at the Friedrichstrasse railway station. As he walked toward the border with his papers, Kukuczka was shot in the back, then taken to the Stasi prison at Hohenschönhausen, 10 kilometres (6.2 mi) away, rather than to the nearby Krankenhaus der Volkspolizei (Hospital of the People's Police), and he died a few hours later from internal injuries.
  - Andrea Checchi, 57, Italian film actor known for La ciociara, died of polyarteritis nodosa, a rare autoimmune disorder

== March 30, 1974 (Saturday) ==
- The 2-hour pilot for the proposed Little House on the Prairie television series was broadcast on NBC after NBC executive Ed Friendly purchased the exclusive rights to adaptations of the series of eight "Little House" children's novels written by Laura Ingalls Wilder between 1932 and 1943. Actor Michael Landon starred in and directed the film that was part of NBC's Saturday Night at the Movies feature, while Melissa Gilbert narrated and portrayed Laura Ingalls. The pilot was the third highest-rated TV broadcast of the week of March 25 to 31 in the U.S., and would debut as a weekly TV series on September 11.
- The Grand National, England's most famous steeplechase horse race, was won by Red Rum and jockey Brian Fletcher, who repeated their 1973 win.
- Born:
  - Miho Komatsu, Japanese pop singer and songwriter; in Kobe, Hyōgo Prefecture
  - Paola Iezzi, Italian pop music singer and partner with her sister in the duo Paola e Chiara; in Milan

== March 31, 1974 (Sunday) ==
- British Airways was created by the merger of four airlines that had been nationalized by the government of the United Kingdom. British Overseas Airways Corporation (popularly known as B.O.A.C.) and British European Airways (BEA) were combined, and the regional carriers Cambrian Airways and Northeast Airlines were included.
- Born:
  - Natali (stage name for Natalia Rudina), Russian pop music singer; in Dzerzhinsk, Russian SFSR, Soviet Union
  - Jani Sievinen, Finnish Olympic swimmer with five world championships in the 100m, 200m and 400m medley; in Vihti
- Died: Elena Zelayeta, 75, Mexican-born U.S. cook whose 1944 book Elena's Famous Spanish and Mexican Recipes and San Francisco TV cooking show It's Fun to Eat introduced traditional Mexican cooking to non-Hispanic residents.
