= February 1974 =

Month of 1974

<<	February 1974					>>
Su	Mo	Tu	We	Th	Fr	Sa
					1	2
3	4	5	6	7	8	9
10	11	12	13	14	15	16
17	18	19	20	21	22	23
24	25	26	27	28

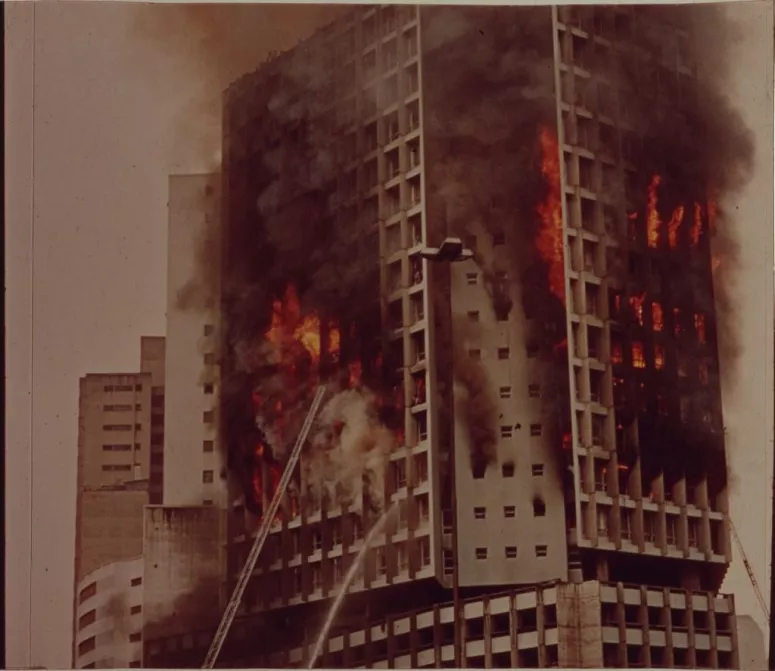
February 1, 1974: High-rise building fire kills 185 people in Brazil

The following events occurred in February 1974:

== February 1, 1974 (Friday) ==
- A fire killed 177 people and injured 293 others in the 23-story Joelma Building at São Paulo in Brazil. Another 11 later died of their injuries. The blaze began on the 12th floor of the building, apparently from a short-circuit in a faulty air conditioner.
- Acting without authority from the Brazilian government, British detectives captured master thief Ronald Biggs in Rio de Janeiro at the Hotel Trocadero on the Copacabana Beach. Biggs, who had been sentenced to 30 years imprisonment for the "great train robbery" of 1963, had been living in Brazil under the alias Michael Haynes and working as a carpenter after escaping from prison in 1965.
- On the last day of the 1974 British Commonwealth Games in Christchurch, New Zealand, Tanzanian athlete Filbert Bayi set a new world record of 3 minutes, 32.2 seconds in the 1500 metres race.
- Kuala Lumpur, the capital of Malaysia, was declared a Federal Territory.
- In the U.S., Lynda Ann Healy, a 21-year-old student at the University of Washington in Seattle, disappeared from her basement apartment and was subsequently killed, becoming the earliest of at least 30 women murdered by serial killer Ted Bundy.
- Born: Roberto Heras, Spanish road cyclist and 4-time winner of the Vuelta a España; in Béjar
- Died:
  - Jackie Kannon, 47, Canadian stand-up comedian, entrepreneur and publisher, died of a heart attack.
  - Alice Eversman, 88, American opera singer and music critic

== February 2, 1974 (Saturday) ==
- After the 1972 declaration of martial law by Philippine President Ferdinand Marcos and the seizure of the private ABS-CBN Corporation network, the Government Television (GTV-4) channel was launched in Manila on VHF channel 4. It would become Maharlika Broadcasting System in 1980, and, after the fall of the Marcos dictatorship, be rebranded as People's Television Network (PTV).

The NZ74 logo

- The 10-day-long 1974 British Commonwealth Games concluded in Christchurch, New Zealand.
- Born:
  - Woo Mi-hwa, award-winning South Korean stage, television and film actress; in Jecheon, North Chungcheong Province
  - Osgood "Oz" Perkins, American actor, screenwriter and director, son of actors Anthony Perkins and Berry Berenson; in New York City
  - Qin Kanying, Chinese chess grandmaster, five-time Chinese national champion; in Shanghai
  - Fariha Pervez, Pakistani pop music singer; in Lahore
- Died:
  - Jean Absil, 80, Belgian composer
  - Marieluise Fleisser, 72, German writer and playwright
  - Stephen Hymer, 39, Canadian economist, was killed in a car accident in Shandaken, New York.
  - Imre Lakatos, 51, Hungarian philosopher of mathematics and science, died of a heart attack.
  - Sir Frank Messervy, KCSI, KBE, CB, DSO & Bar, 80, British Indian Army general who was the first commander-in-chief of the Pakistan Army after the Dominion of Pakistan's independence in 1947.
  - Mauro Pelliccioli, 87, Italian art restorer who worked on the conservation-restoration of Leonardo da Vinci's The Last Supper
  - Lydia Sokolova (stage name for Hilda Tansley Munnings), 77, English ballerina

== February 3, 1974 (Sunday) ==
- Voting took place in Costa Rica for the Central American nation's President and for the 57 seats of the Asamblea Legislativa. After receiving 43.4% of the vote, the threshold for avoiding a runoff election between the top two finishers, Daniel Oduber Quirós was elected to a four-year term to start on May 8, and his National Liberation Party won 27 seats in the Asamblea.
- Born:
  - Shahab Hosseini, Iranian actor and film director; in Tehran
  - Ayanna Pressley, U.S. representative for Massachusetts and one of the eight persons on the far left Democrat group "The Squad"; in Chicago
  - Miriam Yeung (Yeung Chin-wah), Hong Kong actress and singer; in Sai Ying Pun, British Hong Kong

== February 4, 1974 (Monday) ==
- In one of the most famous kidnappings in U.S. history, three members of the left-wing terrorist Symbionese Liberation Army kidnapped 19-year-old Patty Hearst, a granddaughter of newspaper magnate William Randolph Hearst, from her apartment in Berkeley, California. At 9:30 p.m., two African-American men (one of whom was Donald DeFreeze) and a white woman invaded the Berkeley, California apartment of Hearst, a 19-year-old sophomore at the University of California. Hearst's fiancé Steven Weed and a neighbor were beaten, and gunshots were fired at nearby witnesses as the group loaded Hearst into the trunk of a car in the apartment's parking garage.
- In the United Kingdom, the bombing of a bus killed nine soldiers and three civilians (including two children) and injured 38 others. The bus was traveling on the M62 motorway in England when the bomb, hidden in the luggage compartment, exploded near Batley, West Yorkshire, at 12:30 in the morning. The bombing was carried out by the Provisional Irish Republican Army, but the identity of the specific perpetrator or perpetrators remains unknown. Judith Ward was wrongfully convicted of the bombing in November 1974; her conviction was overturned in 1992.
- War resumed between Syria and Israel, with a group of 500 Cuban soldiers joining a Syrian tank division at Mount Hermon in Syria, and then proceeding to battle in the Golan Heights, formerly Syrian territory occupied by Israel since the 1967 Six-Day War. The fighting lasted until a ceasefire was agreed upon on May 31.
- Armed intruders entered the Ya Sin Mosque in Bedford–Stuyvesant, Brooklyn, New York City, leading to a shootout in which two of the intruders, a mosque member and the mosque's leader, Minister Bilal Abdullah Rahman, were killed.
- Born: Urmila Matondkar, Filmafare Award winning Indian actress; in Bombay, Maharashtra
- Died: Satyendra Nath Bose, 80, Indian mathematician and theoretical physicist known for the Bose–Einstein condensate

== February 5, 1974 (Tuesday) ==
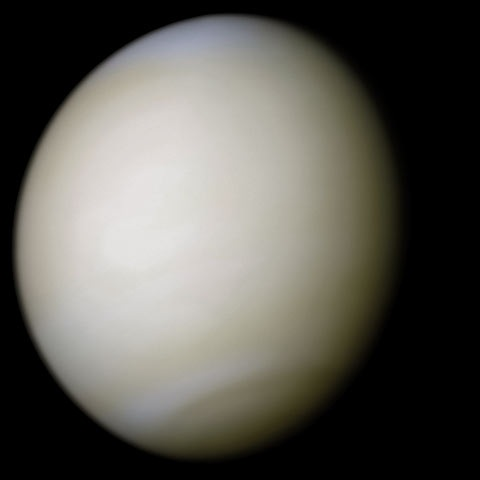
Composite of the first close-up photos of Venus

- The U.S. space probe Mariner 10, launched on November 3, made the first successful broadcast to Earth of images of the planet Venus, starting with the transmission of 4,165 photographs. At 17:01 UTC, it made its closest approach, coming within 3,584 miles (5,768 km) of Venus, then proceeded toward the planet Mercury (which it would reach on March 29).

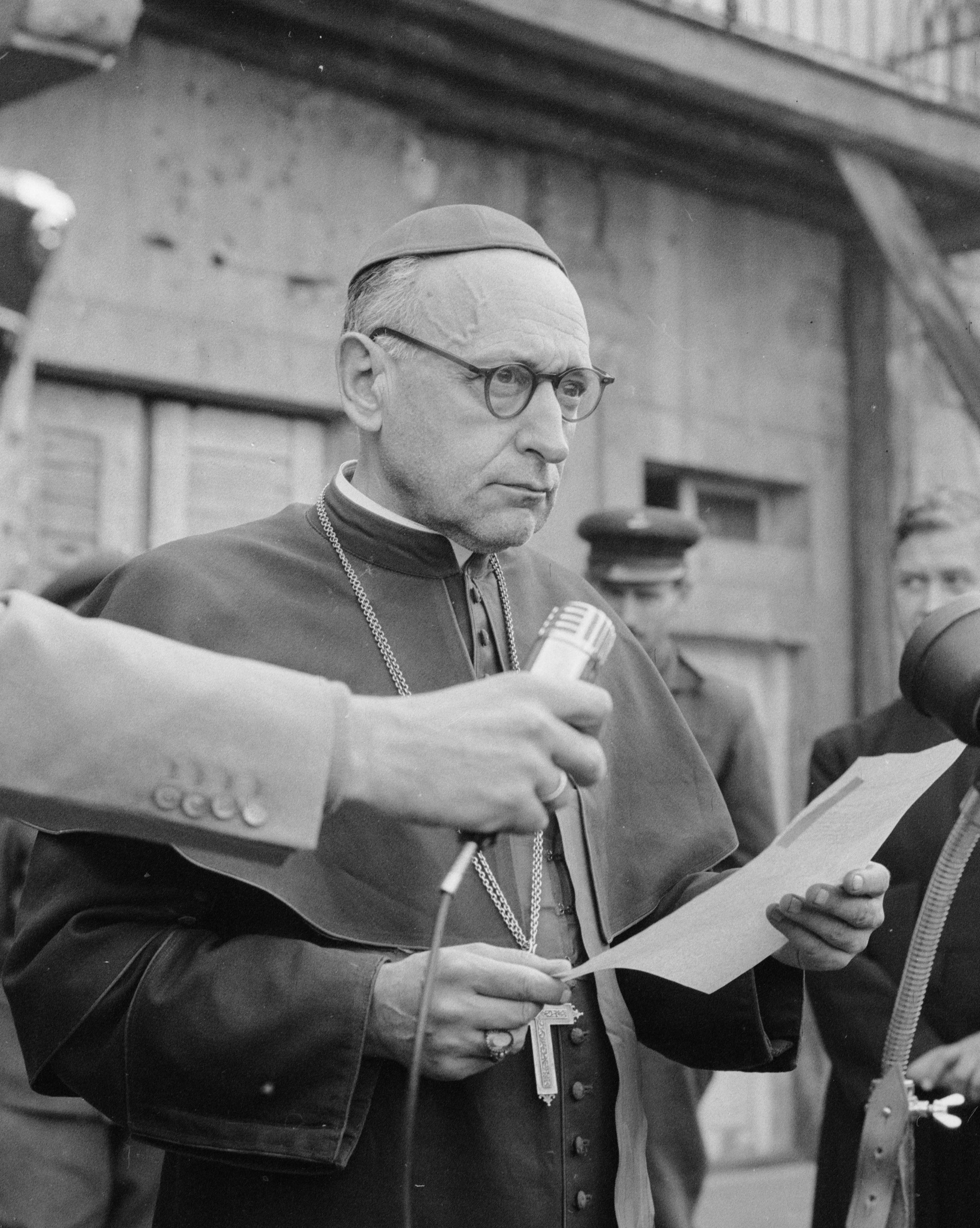
Cardinal Mindszenty

- Cardinal József Mindszenty of Hungary, long a symbol of resistance against totalitarian governments by the Roman Catholic Church, was dismissed by Pope Paul VI from his positions as Archbishop of Esztergom and Primate of Hungary. Mindszenty had been imprisoned for eight years in Hungary and then spent another 15 years inside the U.S. diplomatic legation in Budapest, before being allowed to leave the country in 1971. The dismissal was linked to the Vatican's campaign to establish better relations with the Communist nations in Eastern Europe and Mindszenty's refusal to resign, a condition demanded by the Hungarian Communist Party in negotiations with the Vatican.
- Dr. Raymond Damadian received U.S. Patent No. 3,789,832 for his invention of a proposed "Apparatus and method for detecting cancer in tissue" using nuclear magnetic resonance, after applying on March 13, 1972. The patent described a means of scanning, but not of generating images from a scan, the basis for the magnetic resonance imaging (MRI) scanner.
- Mats Wermelin of Sweden set a record by scoring 272 points for his team in a 272 to 0 win in a regional boys tournament in Stockholm. The story was reported the next day in the Stockholm tabloid Aftonbladet. Wermelin would later play professional basketball for the Stockholm Capitals.
- A two-year-old child who had been kidnapped at knife point more than a year earlier was rescued by the Stanislaus County Sheriff's Department in California. Tommy Lauver, who had been taken from his mother on January 20, 1973, from a supermarket parking lot in Modesto, was found at the home of Robert Coffey and Marjorie Coffey in West Modesto, California, who were arrested after a tip from their neighbor, who had read a story in a local newspaper, The Modesto Bee.
- Harold Potts, the Fire Chief for Gladewater, Texas, was killed by a gunman, and two other firemen were wounded, after responding to a call to extinguish a blaze at a tavern.
- Died: Mestre Bimba (ring name for Manuel dos Reis Machado), 74, master of the Brazilian martial art form capoeira who performed as "Mestre Bimba".

== February 6, 1974 (Wednesday) ==
- A Palestinian guerrilla group seized the Japanese Embassy in Kuwait and took Ambassador Ryoko Ishikawa and several members of his staff hostage, demanding that the four guerrillas trapped aboard the ferryboat Laju in Singapore harbor be flown to Kuwait aboard a Japanese airliner. The Japanese government acceded to the guerrillas' demands, and the hostages were released unharmed after 48 hours.
- The U.S. House of Representatives voted almost unanimously, 410 to 4, to grant the bipartisan House Judiciary Committee the power to subpoena any witness in its inquiry on whether to impeach U.S. President Richard Nixon. A Republican amendment that would have set a deadline of April 30 for any impeachment inquiry failed by a vote of 70 to 342.
- The Roman Catholic Church issued proposed revisions in its ritual for the Sacrament of Penance or confession of sins, with a 121-page document titled Ordo Paenitentiae.
- The science fantasy film Zardoz, directed by John Boorman and starring Sean Connery, opened in Los Angeles and New York City.
- Born: Javier Payeras, Guatemalan poet, novelist and essayist; in Guatemala City
- Died: Dana Latham, 75, former U.S. Commissioner of Internal Revenue.

== February 7, 1974 (Thursday) ==
The flag of Grenada

- At one minute after midnight, the Caribbean island of Grenada became independent of the United Kingdom after 210 years as a British colony. Eric Gairy became the nation's first prime minister, while former colonial governor Leo de Gale became the nation's first Governor-General.
- After being unable to resolve his nation's strike of coal miners, Prime Minister Edward Heath of the United Kingdom said in a televised speech that he would ask for the Crown to dissolve Parliament and to call for a new election for the House of Commons to take place on February 28.
- An agreement between the U.S. and Panama to negotiate a revision of the 1903 Panama Canal Treaty was signed in Panama City by U.S. Secretary of State Henry Kissinger and Panamanian Foreign Minister Juan Antonio Tack.
- Moro rebels in the Philippines massacred 25 civilians in a raid on the town of Pikit on the island of Mindanao.
- Produced by Mel Brooks, the popular satire of movie westerns, Blazing Saddles, had its world premiere in Burbank, California, at the Pickwick Drive-in Theater for 250 invited guests who rode in on horseback rather than in cars, before being released to other U.S. theaters during the winter and spring.
- Born:
  - Steve Nash, Canadian NBA basketball player, NBA Most Valuable Player in 2005 and 2006; in Johannesburg, South Africa
  - J Dilla (stage name for James Dewitt Yancey), American record producer and rapper; in Detroit (d. 2006, cardiac arrest due to thrombotic thrombocytopenic purpura and lupus)
  - Nujabes (stage name for Jun Seba), Japanese record producer and DJ; in Nishi-Azabu, Minato, Tokyo (d. 2010, traffic collision)
- Died:
  - Donald C. McGraw, 76, American publisher who served as president of McGraw-Hill from 1953 to 1966
  - Hiroshi Nakamura, 83, Japanese biochemist, cartographer and nutritionist

== February 8, 1974 (Friday) ==
- A military coup in the Republic of Upper Volta (now Burkina Faso) against the government of Prime Minister Gérard Kango Ouédraogo kept President General Sangoulé Lamizana in power. Lamizana announced the suspension of the Constitution and the dissolution of the National Assembly.

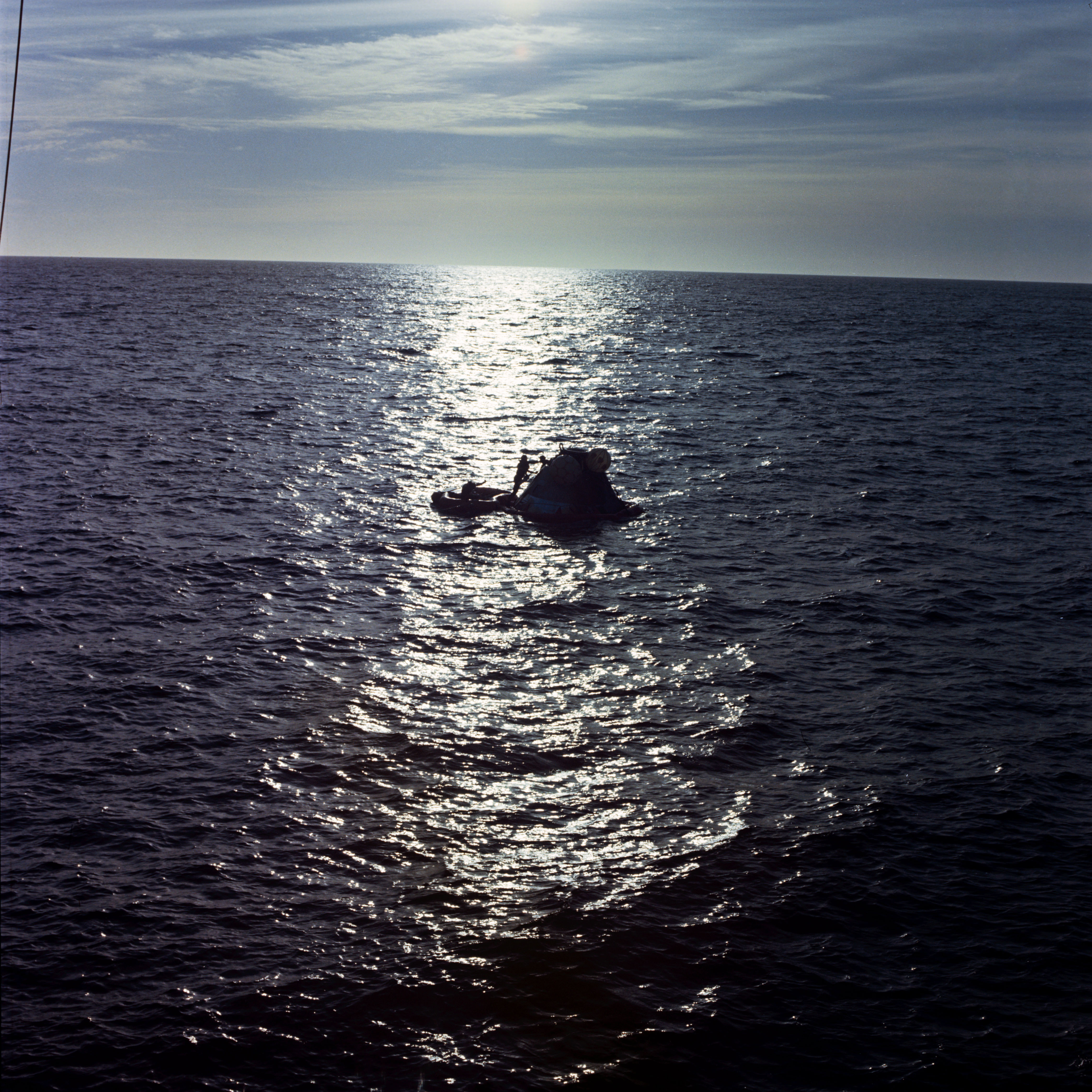
Skylab 4 crew returns to Earth

- After a record 84 days in orbit, the crew of the fourth Skylab mission — astronauts Gerald Carr, Edward Gibson and William Pogue — returned to Earth. Seventy-six minutes after the 84-day mark, the Apollo space capsule separated from the space station and landed in the Pacific Ocean 176 miles (283 km) southwest of the U.S. coast, and was recovered by the amphibious assault ship USS New Orleans (LPH-11). The recovery was the first splashdown of a crewed NASA spacecraft since 1966 not to be broadcast live on U.S. television.
- The popular TV sitcom Good Times premiered on CBS as the first TV show about a two-parent African-American family. The show was a spin-off of Maude (which in turn had been spun off from All in the Family, making Good Times the first "spin-off from a spin-off", with all three shows created by Norman Lear and Bud Yorkin). Esther Rolle brought her role of Florida Evans from Maude and was joined by John Amos as her husband, but actor Jimmie Walker would become the most popular character.
- North Vietnam and South Vietnam resumed their exchange of prisoners of war for the first time since July. A group of 199 Viet Cong guerrillas was transported by a South Vietnamese Army helicopter from Bien Hoa Air Base to the South Vietnamese town of Lộc Ninh, which was under Communist control.
- "A Proclamation for Dissolving the Present Parliament, and Declaring the Calling of Another" was issued in the United Kingdom, which normally would have been made by Queen Elizabeth II, but was issued instead by the Queen Mother and by the Queen's sister, Princess Margaret, in their roles as two of the six "Counsellors of State" "during the period of Her Majesty's absence from the United Kingdom" after "having received the express instructions of Her Majesty". At the time, Queen Elizabeth was in New Zealand for the Commonwealth Games.
- A B-52 Stratofortress veered off the runway, crashed and exploded prior to takeoff from Beale Air Force Base in California, killing seven of its eight crewmembers.
- Born:
  - Seth Green (born Seth Benjamin Gesshel-Green), American film actor and comedian; in Overbrook Park, Philadelphia, Pennsylvania
  - Kimbo Slice (ring name for Kevin Ferguson), Bahamian-born American boxer and mixed martial artist; in Nassau (d. 2016 from congestive heart failure)
  - Guy-Manuel de Homem-Christo, French musician and half of the duo Daft Punk; in Neuilly-sur-Seine, Hauts-de-Seine département
- Died: Fritz Zwicky, 75, Swiss-American astronomer known for the discovery of the gravitational anomaly which he called "dunkel Materie", commonly called dark matter, died of a heart attack.

== February 9, 1974 (Saturday) ==
- In India, President's rule was imposed on the state of Gujarat after Chief Minister Chimanbhai Patel was asked to resign in the face of the violent protests by the Navnirman Andolan movement against state government corruption. President V. V. Giri became the administrator of the state, followed by Fakhruddin Ali Ahmed until the lifting of President's rule on June 18, 1975. The law would remain in effect for 16 years before being repealed in 1990.
- The parliament of Bangladesh enacted the Special Powers Act, 1974, allowing the government to detain any arrested person up to six months without charges, and indefinitely if a special advisory board approved a longer incarceration.
- A U.S. Air Force T-39 jet trainer carrying seven service members from Peterson Airfield in Colorado to McClellan Air Force Base in California crashed into the tail section of an NKC-135 jet at an altitude of 23,000 feet (7,000 m) and exploded, killing all aboard. The wreckage landed in a farmer's pasture 17 miles (27 km) east of Peterson Airfield. The T-39, carrying 18 people, landed safely.
- A boat and 13 people in it was sucked into a whirlpool on the Urubamba River in Peru's La Convención Province, drowning everybody on board.
- Alfred Schnittke's Symphony No. 1 was given its first performance, as Gennady Rozhdestvensky conducted the Gorky Symphony Orchestra in the Soviet Union.
- Died:
  - Lieutenant General Raymond Wheeler, 88, Chief Engineer of the United States Army Corps of Engineers, 1945 to 1949
  - Amund Dietzel, 82, American tattoo artist

== February 10, 1974 (Sunday) ==
- The Soviet Mars 4 space probe, launched in July 1973, flew past Mars at a distance of about 1,300 miles (2,100 km) and took pictures but failed to enter orbit due to a malfunction.
- All 260,000 coal miners in the United Kingdom went on strike as a result of a wage dispute with the National Union of Mineworkers.
- Born:
  - Elizabeth Banks (born Elizabeth Irene Mitchell), American actress and film director; in Pittsfield, Massachusetts
  - David Datuna, Georgian-American artist; in Tbilisi, Georgian Soviet Socialist Republic, Soviet Union (d. 2022, lung cancer)
  - Ivri Lider, Israeli pop singer; in Givat Haim (Ihud)
- Died: Gaston Bergery, 81, French international lawyer, co-founder of the Frontist Party, and aide of Vichy French leader Philippe Petain

== February 11, 1974 (Monday) ==
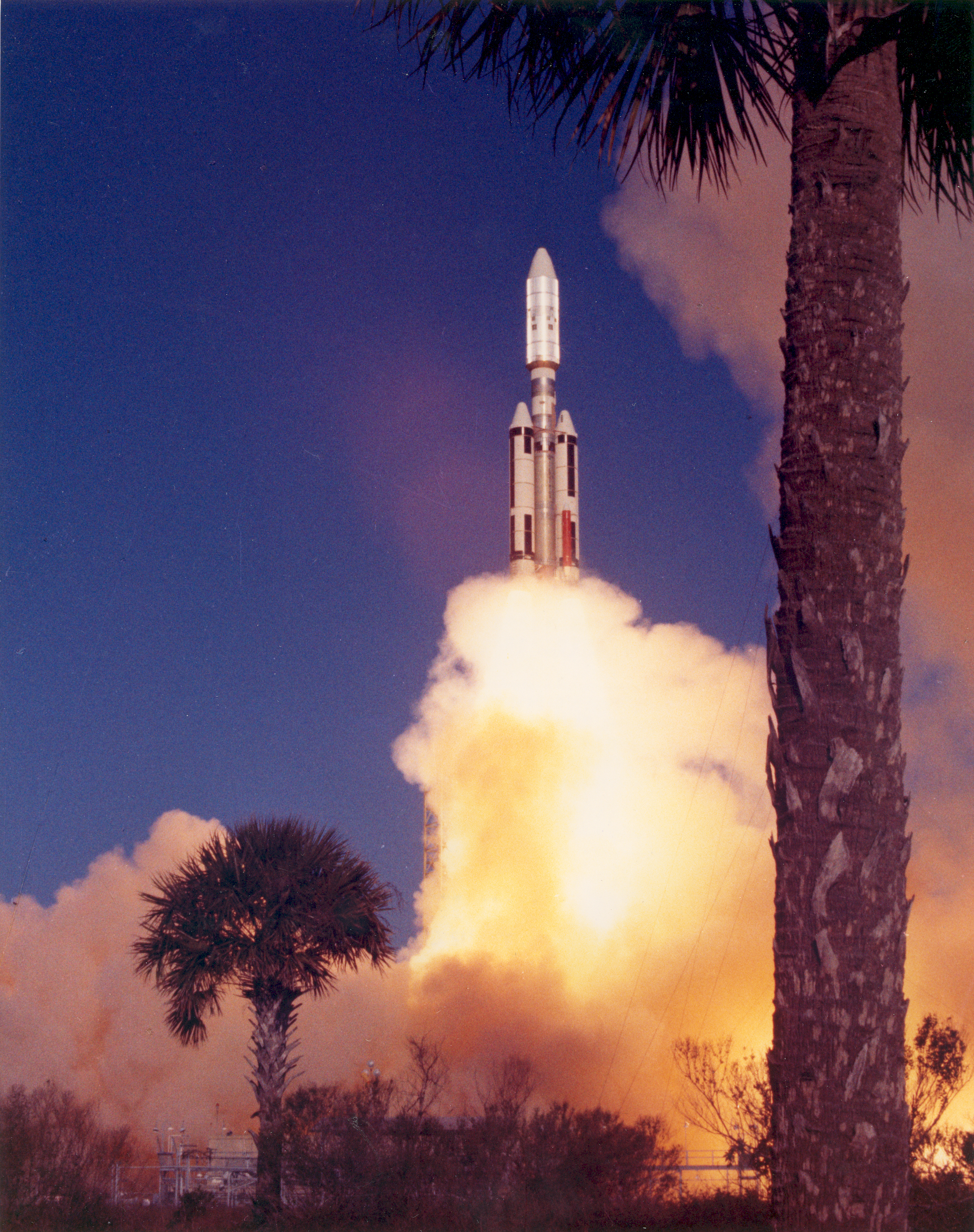
First Titan IIIE launch test

- The first Titan IIIE rocket launched from Cape Canaveral was destroyed by the range safety officer 748 seconds after liftoff due to engine failure. The pieces of the $20,500,000 rocket fell into the Atlantic Ocean 2,200 miles (3,500 km) down range after the destruct order was carried out. Destroyed along with the rocket was its payload, the SPHINX (Space Plasma High Voltage Interaction Experiment) satellite and the supporting Viking Dynamic Simulator.
- Khmer Rouge guerrillas in Cambodia fired a heavy barrage of 105-mm howitzer shells and 122-mm rockets on the capital, Phnom Penh, killing 139 residents and wounding 300 others, as well as destroying 1,200 homes. Most of the victims were in the crowded Sa Deoum Ko marketplace in the southwestern part of the city.
- The Islamic Republic of Libya announced that its government would nationalize Amoseas Petroleum Ltd., jointly operated by Texaco and Standard Oil of California, and the Libyan-American Oil Company, already 60 percent owned by the Libyan government.
- The three-day Washington Energy Conference of oil-consuming nations began to discuss ways of combating the oil crisis.
- Dick Woodson of the Minnesota Twins became the first Major League Baseball player to have his case accepted for arbitration, after being among 45 players to invoke MLB's new free agency clause to resolve a salary dispute.
- Born:
  - D'Angelo (stage name for Michael Eugene Archer), American singer and songwriter, 4-time Grammy Award winner; in Richmond, Virginia
  - Alex Jones, American conservative talk radio host, conspiracy theorist, author and filmmaker, known for having a defamation lawsuit judgment against him for $1.4 billion in Lafferty v. Jones; in Dallas, Texas
  - Pedrito de Portugal (born Pedro Alexander Roque Silva), Portuguese matador known for Portuguese-style bullfighting; in Lisbon
- Died:
  - Anna Q. Nilsson, 85, Swedish-born American silent film star
  - Ghantasala Venkateswararao, 51, popular Indian singer and film score composer, died of a sudden heart attack.

== February 12, 1974 (Tuesday) ==
- Soviet police agents arrested Russian writer and dissident Aleksandr Solzhenitsyn, author of The Gulag Archipelago, at his apartment in Moscow. He would be deported to West Germany and stripped of his Soviet citizenship the following day.
- The Soviet Mars 5 space probe successfully entered orbit around Mars at 14:44 UTC, but sustained a micrometeoroid impact along the way, causing a slow leak in the spacecraft's pressurized instrument compartment. Mars 5 would cease transmission 16 days later, after returning 43 good quality photographs and making spectrometer observations of elements on the Martian surface, and obtaining specific surface temperatures ranging from 28 °F (−2 °C) during the day to −99 °F (−73 °C) at night.
- On Indonesia's Lombok Island, an angry mob raided the houses of the village elders in Dasan, Lajut and Newar Praja and beheaded nine of the men. Police arrested 132 people and their leader, who had compiled a list of 32 village leaders who had tried to stop his business of selling sacred oil to the local residents.
- Born:
  - Naseem Hamed, British boxer, WBO featherweight world champion 1995 to 2000, holtder of WBO, IBF and WBC titles 1999 to 2000; in Sheffield, South Yorkshire
  - Philippe Léonard, Belgian footballer with 28 caps for the Belgium national team; in Liège, Belgium
- Died:
  - Arthur Samish, 75, California lobbyist
  - Alec Harris, 76, Welsh and South African spiritualist known for conducting elaborate séances with multiple "spirit" figures

== February 13, 1974 (Wednesday) ==
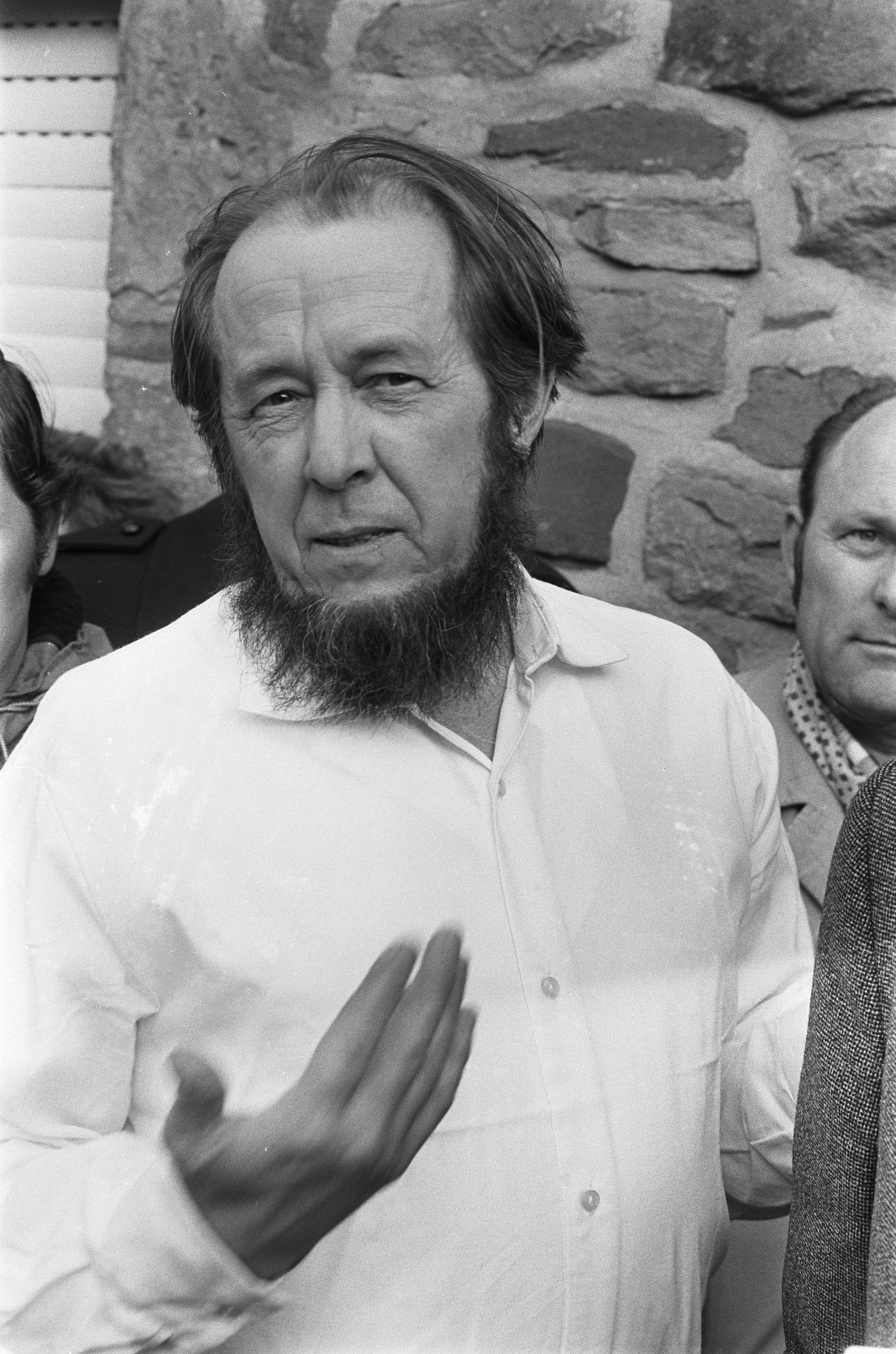
February 14, 1974: Solzhenitsyn in Cologne after his expulsion from the Soviet Union

- After a hearing, a Soviet court revoked the citizenship of dissident writer Aleksandr Solzhenitsyn, ordered him to be removed permanently from the USSR, and placed him on an Aeroflot flight to West Germany. Solzhenitsyn, wearing only the clothes he had put on when he was arrested, arrived in Frankfurt, where friends picked him up and drove him to the home of Heinrich Böll in Langenbroich. A representative of the KGB announced that Solzhenitsyn's wife and children would be allowed to join him "when they deem it necessary." The day after Solzhenitsyn's expulsion, an order from the Soviet Ministry of Culture directed any public or school library with his novel One Day in the Life of Ivan Denisovich to remove the book from its shelves, along with any item containing one of his four published short stories.
- Born:
  - Robbie Williams, English pop music singer with 14 No. 1 best-selling albums, known for the songs "Angels" and "Millennium"; in Newcastle-under-Lyme, Staffordshire
  - Steven Rinella, American hunting outdoorsman and TV personality best known for his weekly show MeatEater on the Sportsman Channel; in Twin Lake, Michigan
- Died:
  - Dan Golenpaul, 73, American radio producer, creator of the Information Please radio quiz show and editor of the Information Please Almanac
  - Sir Leslie Munro KCMG KCVO, 72, New Zealand diplomat, President of the United Nations General Assembly 1957 to 1958
  - Ustad Amir Khan, 61, Hindustani classical singer and founder of the Hindustani gharana organization, was killed in a car accident.

== February 14, 1974 (Thursday) ==
- In Buenos Aires, Argentina, 19-year-old middleweight boxer Ruben Loyola collapsed in the dressing room after losing his third professional bout and never regained consciousness. He would die of a cerebral hemorrhage the following day. Loyola had been fighting against Roque Roldan in the city of Pergamino and lost in a decision after going 15 rounds.
- Born:
  - Valentina Vezzali, Italian Olympic champion fencer with six gold medals in five consecutive Olympic Games (1996, 2000, 2004, 2008 and 2012) and politician; in Iesi, Province of Ancona, Italy
  - Alexander Wurz, Austrian racing driver, winner of two 24 Hours of Le Mans events; in Waidhofen an der Thaya, Lower Austria
  - Matt Redman, English gospel music singer and songwriter, twice a Grammy Award winner; in Watford, Hertfordshire
  - Garik Martirosyan, Armenian-Russian comedian and TV host known for Komedi Klub and the satirical talk show Prozhektorperiskhilton on Russian television; in Yerevan, Armenian SSR, Soviet Union

== February 15, 1974 (Friday) ==
- The North Korean Navy sank a South Korean fishing boat that had strayed too close to the Five West Sea Islands, killing 13 of the 14 people on board. The sole survivor was captured by the North Koreans after a rescue. Later in the day, the crew of 14 of another fishing boat was captured.
- Born: Mr Lordi (stage name for Tomi Petteri Putaansuu), Finnish singer and make-up artist; in Rovaniemi, Lapland
- Died:
  - George W. Snedecor, 92, American mathematician and statistician known for the F-distribution
  - Kurt Atterberg, 86, Swedish composer and engineer

== February 16, 1974 (Saturday) ==
- During an international 500-mile (800 km) snowmobile race in Michigan, 36-year-old American racer Bill Bowen was thrown from his vehicle and struck by two other snowmobiles, dying of his injuries later in the day.
- At a supermarket in Somerset, Massachusetts, three men robbed an armored truck belonging to International Protective Service, Inc., of Providence, Rhode Island, of at least $200,000 in cash.
- Born:
  - Mahershala Ali (born Mahershalalhashbaz Gilmore), American film and TV actor, winner of two Academy Awards for Best Supporting Actor and one Emmy Award; in Oakland, California
  - Jamie Davies, English racing driver, winner of the 2003 24 Hours of Le Mans; in Yeovil, Somerset
  - Tomasz Kucharski, Polish rower with two Olympic gold medals (2000 and 2004); in Gorzów Wielkopolski
  - Mark Mowers, National Hockey League forward; in Decatur, Georgia
- Died:
  - Anita Bush, 90, African American stage and silent film actress and playwright, known as "The Little Mother of Colored Drama"
  - John Garand, 86, Canadian-born American firearms designer who invented the M1 Garand semi-automatic rifle
  - Alfred Mazure, 59, Dutch comics artist known for creating the popular detective comic Dick Bos
  - Paul Struye, 77, Belgian politician and journalist, President of the Belgian Senate 1950 to 1954 and 1958 to 1973
  - Frederick V. Waugh, 75, American agricultural economist known for the Frisch–Waugh–Lovell theorem
  - Enayet Karim, 48, Foreign Secretary of Bangladesh, died four days after suffering a heart attack in his office.

== February 17, 1974 (Sunday) ==
- A stampede killed 49 people and injured 46 others at a soccer football match at the Zamalek Stadium in Cairo, where a Cairo team was scheduled to play against Dukla Praha of Czechoslovakia. Fifteen minutes before kickoff, 60,000 people had crowded into the 40,000 capacity stadium after organizers had canceled TV coverage and moved the game from 100,000-seat Nasser Stadium despite all 100,000 tickets being sold. The match was canceled after the disaster, but Dukla Praha and Zamalek Sporting Club would play on February 19.

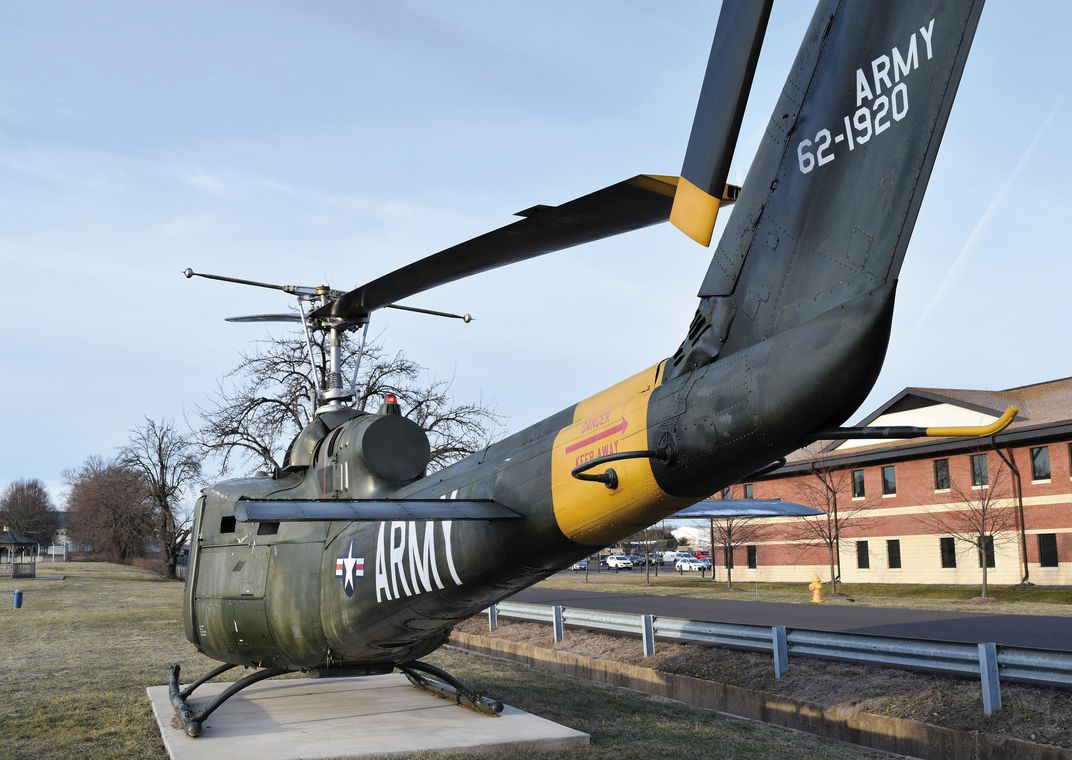
The helicopter

- At 2 a.m., 20-year-old U.S. Army Private First Class Robert K. Preston landed a stolen helicopter on the South Lawn of the White House, about 100 yards (91 m) from the residence, after the Executive Protection Service fired with shotguns and struck the aircraft. Preston had stolen the helicopter from the Tipton Airfield at Fort Meade in Maryland. U.S. President Richard Nixon was at his vacation home at Key Biscayne, Florida at the time of the incident. Preston would receive a one-year prison sentence and a general discharge from the Army, dying of cancer in 2009.
- Spiro Agnew, the former Vice President of the United States, lost all rights to protection by the U.S. Secret Service, four months after his resignation. Agnew's security detail of at least 12 agents left after midnight after traveling with him to the home of Frank Sinatra in Palm Springs, California.
- In Queens, New York City, a fire destroyed the 117-year-old St. Mary's Star of the Sea church building.
- During disturbances in Belfast, British Army troops shot and killed a member of the Ulster Defence Association and mortally wounded another, who would die on February 25.
- Coretta Scott King, the widow of civil rights leader Dr. Martin Luther King Jr., unveiled a portrait of her husband in the Georgia State Capitol in Atlanta, the first picture of a black man ever displayed in that building. A statue of King would be unveiled on the State Capitol grounds in 2017.
- American driver Richard Petty won the 1974 Daytona 500, his fifth victory in the event, becoming the first driver to win the race two years in a row. Because of the ongoing energy crisis, the race was only 450 miles (720 km) and 180 laps around the track in Daytona Beach, Florida. In order to make 200 laps, the first lap was designated as "Lap 21".
- Born:
  - Al-Muhtadee Billah, Crown Prince of Brunei; in Istana Darul Hana, Bandar Seri Begawan
  - Jerry O'Connell, American film and TV actor; in Manhattan, New York City
- Died:
  - Jack Cole (stage name for John Ewing Richter), 62, American dancer and choreographer
  - Ralph W. Gerard, 73, American neurophysiologist and behavioral scientist

== February 18, 1974 (Monday) ==
- At 7:29 p.m., Colonel Thomas L. Gatch, Jr., took off in his balloon Light Heart from Harrisburg, Pennsylvania, to attempt the first crossing of the Atlantic Ocean in a balloon. Air currents pushed Light Heart far south of Gatch's planned course. An airliner would make the final radio contact with Gatch on February 19, and the last sighting would be by a freight ship, Ore Meridian, on February 21. The search by the U.S. Department of Defense was abandoned on March 6 after more than two weeks. Neither Light Heart nor Gatch had been found almost 50 years after his disappearance.
- Daniel Patrick Moynihan, the U.S. Ambassador to India, presented the largest check on record to the government of India, canceling India's $3.2 billion debt to the U.S. for food and humanitarian aid after signing an agreement with the government. Moynihan presented the Indian Secretary of Economic Affairs, M. G. Kaul, with a check signed by John G. Kaptain, the disbursement officer for the U.S. Embassy in India, for 16,640,000,000 (16 billion, 640 million) Indian rupees, equivalent to $2,046,700,000 in U.S. dollars under the prevailing exchange rate. The remainder of the remaining 1.17 billion dollars would be drawn upon for operations of the U.S. embassy and for educational and cultural projects. Moynihan commented later, "I never saw so much money on such a small piece of paper in my life."
- Born:
  - Nadine Labaki, Lebanese film director, actress and activist; in Baabdat, Mount Lebanon Governorate
  - Jillian Michaels, U.S. fitness expert and TV personality; in Los Angeles
- Died: Arthur Elrod, 49, American interior designer, was killed in a traffic accident when the vehicle he was in was struck by a drunk driver.

== February 19, 1974 (Tuesday) ==
- The Foreign Ministry of the Soviet Union summoned ambassadors from the U.S., the UK, France and other Western nations and announced that it would end most travel restrictions against diplomats. A spokesperson told the ambassadors that they would be allowed to travel, without prior permission, to any non-restricted area of the Soviet Union, as long as 24 hours notice had been given, and allowing free access to all but restricted areas within the 40-kilometre (25 mi) radius of central Moscow.
- Born: Keila Vall de la Ville, Venezuelan author, known for Los días animales.
- Died: John Oliver Henderson, 64, United States federal judge, died after surgery for a ruptured aorta.

== February 20, 1974 (Wednesday) ==
- Second Lieutenant Hiroo Onoda, a member of the Imperial Japanese Army's intelligence unit who had been in hiding on Lubang Island in the Philippines for 29 years after World War II, was located by a Japanese adventurer, Norio Suzuki. After being told that World War II had ended, 2nd Lt. Onoda told Suzuki that he would not surrender until ordered to by a superior officer, and finally gave up on March 9 when his former commander, Major Yoshimi Taniguchi, delivered the order. Onoda was the second-to-last Japanese officer to surrender after World War II. The last one, Teruo Nakamura, would be located in Indonesia on December 18, 1974.
- J. Reginald Murphy, editor of the Atlanta Constitution newspaper, was kidnapped by a right-wing activist who claimed to be a member of a group called the "American Revolutionary Army". Murphy was freed two days later after the newspaper paid a ransom of $700,000, and William A.H. Williams was arrested later in the day after the FBI had been tipped off by a Miami investor who had been swindled out of $6,000 by Williams.
- Born:
  - Ömer Halisdemir, Turkish Army non-commissioned officer who foiled the 2016 attempt to overthrow the Turkish government; in Niğde (killed 2016)
  - Monita Rajpal, Hong Kong-born Canadian journalist and TV anchor for CNN; in Hong Kong
- Died: Matilde Hidalgo, 84, Ecuadorian physician and women's rights activist

== February 21, 1974 (Thursday) ==
- The last Israeli troops on the west bank of the Suez Canal departed on schedule, after having controlled both sides of the canal since 1967.
- A new constitution went into effect in Yugoslavia on the proclamation of President Josip Broz Tito after being approved in a special session of parliament. Since 1971, the Socialist Federal Republic of Yugoslavia had technically been ruled by the 23-member Presidency of Yugoslavia (in Serbian, the Predsedništvo), with Tito as the Chairman of the Presidency. The new constitution designated Tito as the Chairman for the rest of his life, and the Presidency was reduced to nine members (Tito and one leader from each of the six socialist republics and two autonomous regions). After Tito's death, the chair would be rotated annually to one of the socialist republic leaders.
- In India, the collision of a fast moving passenger train and a stalled freight train killed 40 people and injured 19 others near Moradabad in the Uttar Pradesh state.
- Near Weaverville, California, Trinity High School students conducted a mock funeral for the Trinity River, claiming that the Trinity Dam had ruined it as a habitat for fish.
- Died: Tim Horton, 44, Canadian ice hockey player and co-founder of the Tim Hortons restaurant chain, was killed in a car accident while driving eastbound on the Queen Elizabeth Way in Canada in St Catherines, Ontario. According to a local police constable whom he passed, the defenseman for the Buffalo Sabres NHL team had been driving "over 100 miles an hour" while on his way home to Buffalo, New York, after a 4 to 2 loss the night before to the Toronto Maple Leafs. Horton was thrown from his Ford Pantera car after the car ran onto a grass median and rolled over several times.

== February 22, 1974 (Friday) ==
- A group of 157 trainees of the South Korean Navy were killed when the tugboat YTL 30 capsized and sank 700 yards (640 m) offshore in Chungmu City harbor. Another 159 were rescued by naval vessels and fishing boats.
- Hosting the opening of the three-day Organisation of Islamic Conference summit in Lahore, Pakistan extended diplomatic recognition to Bangladesh, the former East Pakistan. After the first day of the summit, the leaders of 39 Muslim nations prayed together at the Badshahi Mosque.
- During a failed attempt at Baltimore/Washington International Airport to hijack Delta Air Lines Flight 523 to Atlanta, 44-year-old Samuel Byck shot and killed an airport policeman and the copilot of the DC-9 and seriously wounded the pilot before killing himself. Byck had intended to crash the plane into the White House in order to assassinate President Nixon.
- The Teleamazonas television network began broadcasting in Ecuador as color television was introduced to South America.
- The Italian oil-tanker Giovanna Lolli Ghetti exploded and sank in the Pacific Ocean after departing Los Angeles in the U.S. with a cargo of oil bound for Indonesia, killing seven of the people on board.
- A food giveaway by the Hearst Corporation, on behalf of kidnap victim Patty Hearst, made at the demand of the Symbionese Liberation Army as a condition of setting the heiress free, began in San Francisco and Oakland at four distribution centers where bags of groceries were given away. The bags contained "a small frozen turkey, a box of crackers, a box of biscuit mix, a can of tomato juice and a quart carton of milk," for the thousands of people who showed up.
- Student protests began in Ethiopia over soaring prices and began a series of events that would eventually lead to the overthrow of Emperor Haile Selassie. Within five days, the rebellion had spread to the northeast African nation's armed forces.
- U.S. Navy Lieutenant (junior grade) Barbara Allen became the first woman in the U.S. to be designated as a naval aviator, receiving her wings pin at ceremonies at Naval Air Station Corpus Christi.
- Born: James Blunt, English singer with three number 1 best-selling albums; in Tidworth, Hampshire
- Died: Adlai Rust, 81, former Chief Executive Officer of State Farm Mutual Automobile Insurance Company, 1954 to 1970

== February 23, 1974 (Saturday) ==
- More than two years after the Bangladeshi war of independence from Pakistan, the leaders of Pakistan and Bangladesh (formerly East Pakistan) made peace with each other. Sheik Mujibur Rahman, the Prime Minister of Bangladesh, was welcomed to Lahore by Pakistan's Prime Minister Zulfiqar Ali Bhutto. The welcome came the day after Pakistan extended diplomatic recognition to its former province, which had seceded in 1971.
- An artillery shell fired more than 55 years earlier killed seven people near the Italian town of Asiago. A group of scavengers were looking for war material left during the 1916 Battle of Asiago fought in World War I between the Italian Army and an invading force from the Austro-Hungarian Empire.
- Died:
  - George Van Biesbroeck, 94, Belgian-born American astronomer
  - William Knowland, 65, U.S. Senator for California from 1945 to 1959 and Senate Majority Leader 1953-1955 and 1956-1957, publisher of the Oakland Tribune newspaper, committed suicide with a self-inflicted gunshot wound. His death came two days after the Oakland Tribune celebrated the 100th anniversary of its 1874 founding.
  - J. W. B. Barns, 61, British Egyptologist
  - Harry Ruby, 79, American musician, film score composer and songwriter known for "Who's Sorry Now?"

== February 24, 1974 (Sunday) ==
- The Fireforce military tactic, perfected by the white 1st Battalion of the Rhodesian Light Infantry in the Bush War, was first put to use as part of the counterinsurgency against the black guerrilla soldiers of the Zimbabwe African National Liberation Army (ZANLA).
- The legacy of the ancient Chinese philosopher Confucius became the latest target of the Cultural Revolution as Prime Minister Zhou Enlai of the People's Republic of China confirmed that the Communist government would support a nationwide campaign to discredit Confucius and the late Lin Biao as "reactionaries who tried to turn back the wheel of history." Zhou made his comments at a state banquet in Beijing for the visiting President of Zambia, Kenneth Kaunda.
- Born:
  - Gila Gamliel, Israeli Minister of Intelligence; in Gedera
  - Oscar Mabuyane, Premier and head of government of the Eastern Cape province of South Africa somce 2-10; in Engcobo, Transkei bantustan, South Africa
  - Mike Lowell, U.S. Major League Baseball third baseman for the Boston Red Sox and MVP of the 2007 World Series; in San Juan, Puerto Rico
- Died:
  - Margaret Leech (aka Margaret Pulitzer), 80, American historian and fiction writer, died of a stroke.
  - Charlotte Zaltzberg (born Charlotte Singer), 49, American writer, co-author of the book for the 1973 musical Raisin, died of breast cancer.
  - Robert A. Stemmle, 70, German screenwriter and film director
  - Joseph Striker, 74, American film and stage actor, star of the 1929 film (The House of Secrets)
  - Lothar Mendes, 79, German-born British screenwriter and director known for The Man Who Could Work Miracles

== February 25, 1974 (Monday) ==
- The first issue of People magazine, post-dated March 4, 1974, went on sale at newsstands and supermarkets in the United States as a new weekly publication from Time Inc., providing news and photographs of celebrities and some stories about non-celebrities. Actress Mia Farrow was the first person to be featured on the cover of the magazine, which was sold for 35 cents, and subscriptions were initially not available.
- The first "single-point urban interchange" on a highway was opened at Clearwater, Florida, in the United States at the intersection of U.S. Route 19 and Florida State Road 60.
- Born:
  - Divya Bharti, Indian film actress; in Bombay (killed in an accidental fall, 1993)
  - Sébastien Loeb, French rally driver, winner of 9 consecutive World Rally Championships 2004 to 2012; in Haguenau, Bas-Rhin département
  - Dominic Raab, British Foreign Secretary 2019-2021, Deputy Prime Minister of the United Kingdom 2021 to 2023; in Buckinghamshire, England
- Died:
  - Winthrop W. Aldrich GBE, 88, American banker and financier, U.S. Ambassador to the Court of St James's as the senior diplomat to the UK, 1953 to 1957
  - Frank Assunto, 42, American jazz trumpeter for the Dukes of Dixieland band

== February 26, 1974 (Tuesday) ==
- The Gambell incident occurred when a Soviet ice reconnaissance aircraft was running low on fuel and made an emergency landing in the United States. The Antonov An-24 touched down at the airport at Gambell, Alaska on St. Lawrence Island with 15 people on board; the 12 passengers were all Soviet scientists. Two days later, the An-24 was refueled by a U.S. Air Force C-130 airplane and departed at 7:30 in the evening.
- "SN 1974C", a supernova that had occurred at least 46 million years earlier, was observed on Earth for the first time. The supernova was first spotted from Earth by astronomer Arp van der Kruit.
- Officers of the 2nd Division of the Ethiopian Army and at an Ethiopian Air Force base seized control of the African nation's second largest city, Asmara.
- Died: Paul Sample, 77, American artist

== February 27, 1974 (Wednesday) ==
- The sinking of a Mexican Navy tugboat drowned 43 of the crew of 46. The vessel sank 60 miles (97 km) off of the coast of Veracruz after having engine trouble during bad weather.
- U.S. Secretary of State Henry Kissinger was in Damascus meeting with Syrian president Hafez al-Assad, and because the meeting "lasted longer than expected", he apparently avoided an assassination attempt that would have been made on him at the Umayyad Mosque. Syrian intelligence officials said that they learned about the plot only after the missed visit.
- On the same day that Ethiopia's Emperor Haile Selassie opened a meeting of the Organization of African Unity (OAU) hosted in Addis Ababa, rebels within the Ethiopian Navy seized control of the naval base at Massawa, the nation's leading port. Prime Minister Aklilu Habte-Wold and his entire cabinet submitted their resignations later in the day.
- After being nominated by Prime Minister Gough Whitlam, John Kerr was appointed by Queen Elizabeth II to be the next Governor-General of Australia, as the successor of Paul Hasluck. Kerr would take office on July 11. Less than two years later, Kerr would dismiss Whitlam and replace him with Malcolm Fraser.
- France's Interior Minister Raymond Marcellin was forced to resign after police from the Ministry's Directorate of Territorial Security were caught attempting to place eavesdropping devices in the offices of Le Canard enchaîné, a weekly investigative newspaper.
- The Governor of Argentina's Córdoba Province, Ricardo Obregón Cano, was taken prisoner at his residence in the Córdoba after a rebellion by the provincial police by officers. An estimated 800 mutineering police, angry at Obregon for firing police chief Antonio Navarro, invaded the Government House and took him hostage, along with the Vice-Governor, Atilio Lopez and the new police chief. The next day, the Provincial Superior Court cleared the way for Mario Agodino, a supporter of President Juan Perón, to replace the left-leaning Governor Obregón, based on a section of the Córdoba constitution that provided that a successor could be appointed when the governor was "unable to perform his duties", including being held hostage. Obregón Cano and Vice Governor Lopez were freed two days later, but not allowed to return to office.
- Born:
  - Hiroyasu Shimizu, Japanese speed skater, 1998 Olympic gold medalist and winner of five world championships in the 500 metre race; in Obihiro, Hokkaido island
  - Julie Andrieu, French food critic and host of multiple cooking shows on television; in Neuilly-sur-Seine, Paris
  - Carte Goodwin, U.S. Senator for West Virginia for four months from July to November 2010, appointed to fill the seat of the late Robert Byrd.

== February 28, 1974 (Thursday) ==
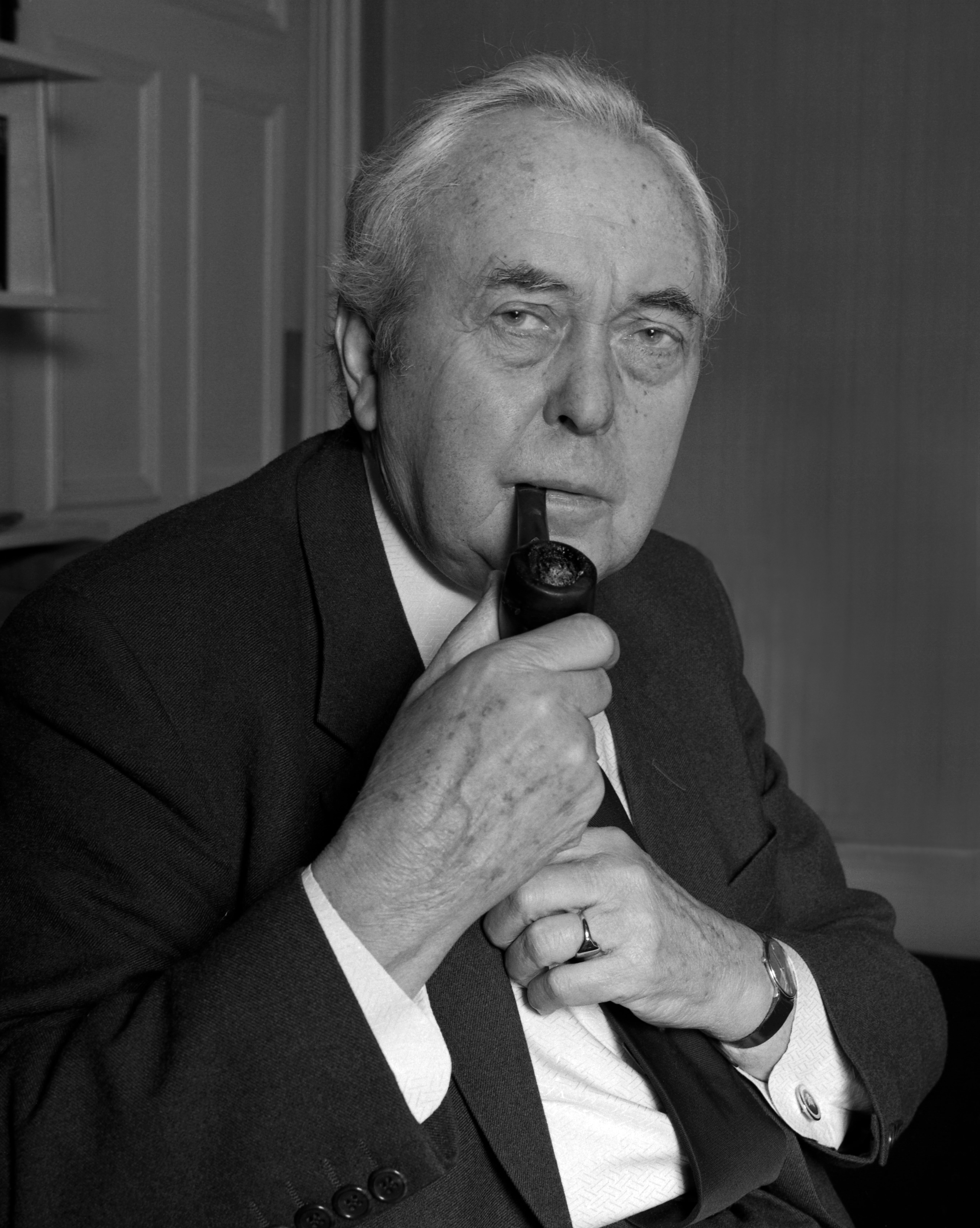
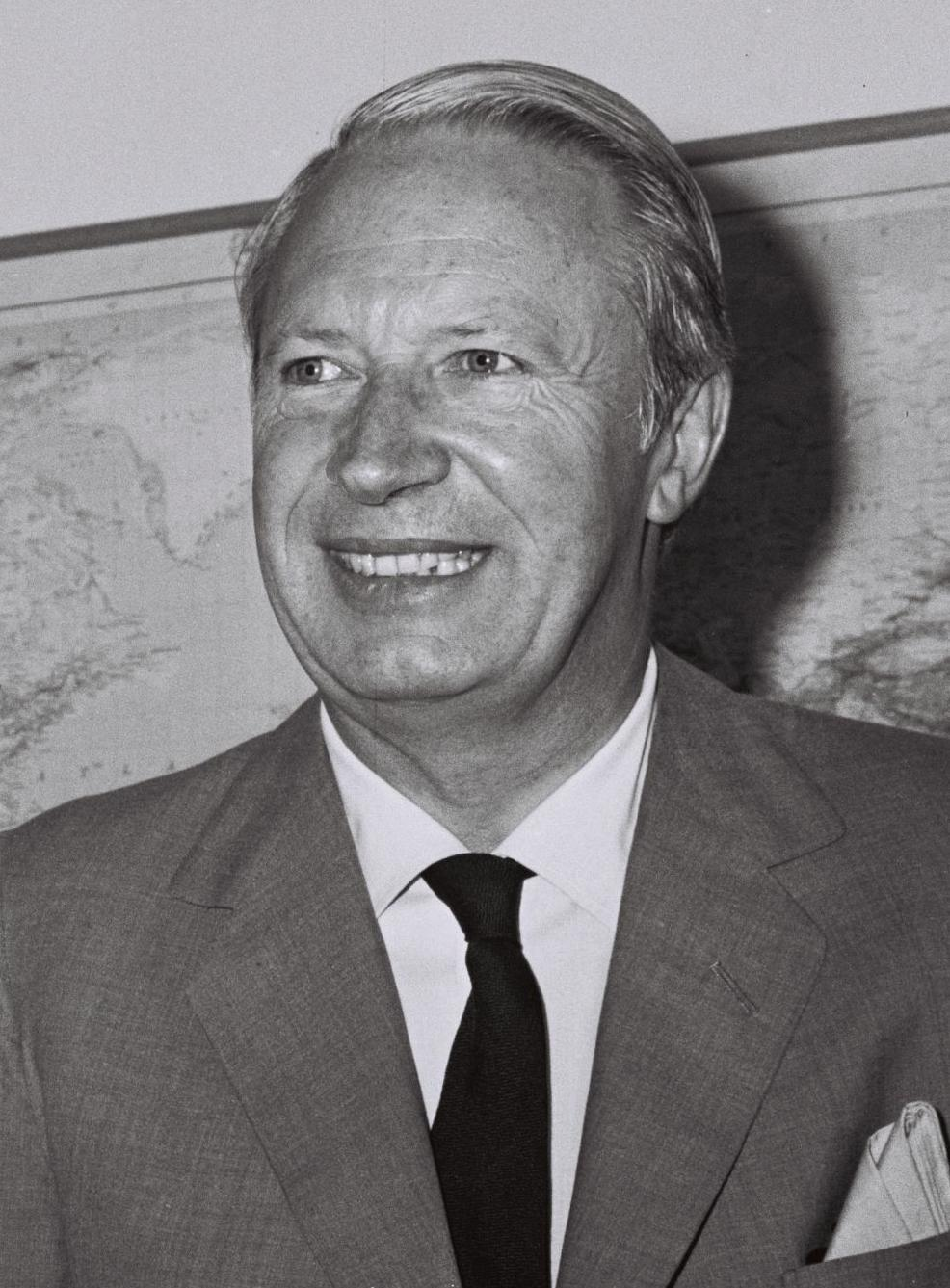
Harold Wilson (Labour) and Edward Heath (Conservative)
- The British general election ended in the first hung parliament since 1929, with no party having the required 318 seats to form a majority government in the 635-seat House of Commons. Prime Minister Edward Heath's Conservative Party lost its majority, losing 28 seats to fall from 330 seats to 297, while Harold Wilson and the Labour Party gained 14 to win a plurality of 301 seats. The Liberal Party, led by Jeremy Thorpe won 14 seats, its largest share ever, while 21 other seats went to six other parties. After being unable to form a coalition government, Heath stepped down and was replaced as prime minister by Wilson on March 4.
- Rebellious Ethiopian Army troops took control of most of the capital of Addis Ababa. Roadblocks were set up around the city, particularly at approaches to the city's airport, in an attempt to arrest the 19 members of the Cabinet who had resigned the day before.
- Egypt and the United States restored full diplomatic relations for the first time in almost seven years as the U.S. Embassy reopened in Cairo. U.S. Ambassador Hermann F. Eilts was received by Egypt's President Anwar Sadat and Egyptian Ambassador Ashraf Ghorbal was designated to come to the Egyptian Embassy in Washington.
- The Palais des congrès de Paris was inaugurated, with Georg Solti conducting a performance of the finale of Beethoven's Symphony No. 9.
- Died:
  - Bobby Bloom, 28, American singer and songwriter, was shot to death at the home of his former girlfriend, either in a suicide or a murder.
  - Carole Lesley (born Maureen Rippingale), 38, English actress, committed suicide by drug overdose.
  - Roland Rohlfs, 82, American aviator who held the world record for highest altitude in 1919 for reaching 34,610 feet (10,550 m).
