= Nikolay Tsekhomsky =

Russian financier and senior manager (born 1974)

- Born: 21 March 1974 (age 52); Leningrad, Soviet Union
- Education: St. Petersburg academy for engineering and economics
- Occupations: Financier, senior manager

Nikolay Tsekhomsky (Russian: Николай Викторович Цехомский; born March 21, 1974, in Leningrad, USSR) is a Russian financier and senior manager. He has headed finance departments of MTS, Renaissance Capital and VTB banks; held the post of chairman of the board of Barclays bank Russia, and he was senior vice president and member of the board of Sberbank of Russia.

== Biography ==
=== Education, early career ===
Nikolay Tsekhomsky was born in Leningrad on March 21, 1974. In 1995, he graduated from the St. Petersburg academy for engineering and economics majoring in management, and in 1996 – majoring in Economics and Management in Engineering. During his senior years at the academy, Tsekhomsky headed the Saint Petersburg regional committee of the International Student Association AIESEC. After finishing the graduate school in 1999, he received a PhD in economics.

Tsekhomsky's career started in 1995 in the Saint Petersburg department of Ernst & Young, the audit company. After working as an economist and economist-auditor for two years, he was transferred to the position of the senior auditor in the London department of the company. In August 1998, Tsekhomsky returned to Russia to hold the post of the deputy financial controller and chief accountant in Brunswick UBS Warburg in Moscow regional office.

financial control officer and senior accountant of the Moscow regional office of Brunswick UBS Warburg, an American investment bank. He has later saved the position despite laying off 250 out of 300 employees that followed the default and financial crisis in 1998.

In 1999, Tsekhomsky accepted Stephen Jennings' offer and took job as chief financial officer at his Renaissance Capital investment bank. His responsibilities included restructuring the bank that had suffered from crisis and adjustment of business processes.

=== MTS ===
In September 2002, Tsekhomsky took similar position with the telecom operator Mobile TeleSystems, and was promoted to vice president of finance and investment in July 2003. His main task was to overcome the atomism of the business that had occurred due to acquiring other market players: regional companies acquired by MTS had kept their management, standards and financial report systems that differed from those established in parent company.

Tsekhomsky changed the organizational structure of the finance department. The changes included dividing the branch network into 10 conditional parts where chief financial officers were responsible for standardization and reporting by regions.

Tsekhomsky's responsibilities at MTS included the following: being on the board of directors of MTS MTS Ukraine; organizing several issues of MTS's eurobonds; supervising accountability of the public company to regulatory authorities in the United States and Great Britain (MTS's stock was trading in the New York and London Stock Exchange); and participating in preparatation of an initial public offering of Sistema, the principal shareholder of the company.

=== VTB ===
Tsekhomsky took the position of senior vice president and chief financial officer of Vnestorgbank in October 2005 as a part of the bank's preparation to partial privatization through IPO after abandoning the plans to attract a strategic investor (such as European Bank for Reconstruction and Development, Deutsche Bank or Mediobanca). Here, Tsekhomsky also developed stock options plan and held supervisory board of the banks that belonged to VTB: Industry and Construction Bank of Saint Petersburg, Kyiv JSCB "Mria" (after the IPO they became the bank's branches) and VTB 24.

The IPO organized by Citigroup, Deutsche Bank and Renaissance Capital was held in May 2007 at the Moscow Interbank Currency Exchange and London Stock Exchange. The bank attracted 8 billion dollars for 22,5% of shares, including 1,5 billion from 131 thousand private investors in Russia. The IPO has become the most large-scale in the history of the domestic stock market and the largest bank offering in Europe. The market players, specifically, the president of Renaissance Capital Ruben Aganbegyan, noted that IPO of a big bank had been the major professional success of Tsechomskiy as a financier.

=== Barclays Bank ===
Barclays bank Russia was created in spring 2008 with the acquisition of Ekspobank by the British financial group and became the second attempt for Barclays to open a commercial bank in Russia (the first attempt in 1998 failed, and 250 million pounds were lost). Before the deal, Ekspobank occupied the 77th place in the country with 30,7 billion rub. in terms of capital, but during the crisis years of 2008-2009 its assets have decreased by 48% and the bank fell to the 127th place. By October 2009, a share of overdue debt in the business portfolio has reached 30%, and 14% in retail. In 2009, Barclays invested 4,3 billion rub. in recapitalization of the bank.

Since autumn of 2008, the financial group had been looking for an experienced senior manager to control subsidiaries, and Frits Siggers, the manager of retail and corporate business of the bank, launched the negotiations with Tsekhomsky in spring 2009. In November 2009, Tsekhomsky accepted the offer of Barclays. They decided at once to put efforts to developing retail business. In summer of 2010, Tsekhomsky presented a new strategy that limited the geography of work to Moscow and Saint Petersburg and focused on mortgage products, development of corporate and retail lending, providing service to corporations and wealthy private individuals.

Despite increasing the financial figures of Barclays, in the end of 2010, Tsekhomsky suggested to sale the bank. This decision coincided with changing the bank's strategy to refuse risky and unpromising assets. In February 2011, the financial group officially started searching for a buyer. In October 2011, the bank was bought by a group of investors headed by Igor Kim, the co-owner of the East Express Bank and MDM Bank. He replaced Tsekhomsky in the position of the chairman of the board in December.

=== Sberbank ===
In November 2012, the first management personnel change in two years resulted in Tsekhomsky heading the finance department of the Sberbank of Russia. Soon he took the position of a counsellor of the bank's President Herman Gref, and in January he held the post of the vice president and finance director and became part of the board. In July 2014, Tsekhomsky became one of three senior vice presidents of Sberbank.

=== VEB.RF ===
In March 2016, Tsekhomsky moved to Vneshekonombank (VEB, later VEB.RF) and was appointed the first deputy chairman.

=== Other ===
In December 2009, Tsekhomsky became a member of the executive candidate pool under the patronage of the President of Russia Dmitry Medvedev. In April 2011, the director general of Norilsk Nickel Vladimir Strzhalkovskiy invited Tsekhomsky to join the board of directors of TransCreditBank. Here, he conducted due diligence of a bank which became the grounds for dismissing the former Director General Alexander Dymov in the end of 2011. During 2012, Tsekhomskiy was a private investor, funding a network of private kindergartens and taking part in a syndicated venture round.

== Acknowledgement ==
Tsekhomsky was many times placed high in all-Russian executives ratings prepared by the Association of Managers of Russia. In 2005, restructuring of MTS's assets earned him the 5th place in the list of the best 200 chief financial executives. Together with the top position in the 2008 rating, he received the Aristos prize annually presented by the association and Kommersant publishing house. A year later he took the first place in the category of Chief Financial Executives of commercial banks. After his transfer to Barclays, Tsekhomsky took the 10th place in the rating of the managers of commercial banks in 2010 The interview with Tsekhomsky is included in the book "Time. Business. People. 2005-2014: Best of TOP-1000 Russian Managers" prepared by the Association of Managers of Russia and the Snob project that was published in September 2015 by Alpina Publisher.

In addition, in 2008, Tsekhomsky was included in the "33 peppers" rating of the "Finance" magazine held among successful businessmen and managers in the age group up to 33 years. In 2012, he joined the jury of Russian CFO Awards, the industry award for finance managers organized by the Institute of Adam Smith.

== Personal life ==
Divorced, with a son and a daughter.

Nikolay Tsekhomsky is committed to charity work. He used to be a donor and a member of the supervisory board of the Warm Home Children's Charity Foundation; served on the board of directors of the United Way of Russia Charity Fund; sponsored the Maria's Children Arts Center for orphans, special needs children and orphanage graduates, and UWC Dilijan, a non-profit educational project established by Armenian and British charity funds.
