= Alla Levashova =

Russian fashion designer

- Алла Александровна Левашова
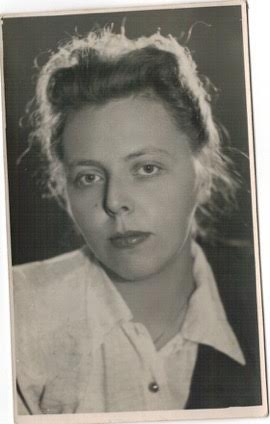
- Born: 22 March 1918; Moscow
- Died: 3 March 1974 (aged 55); Moscow
- Citizenship: Soviet
- Education: Moscow Textile Institute
- Occupation: Fashion designer

Alla Levashova (22 March 1918 – 3 March 1974) was a Soviet fashion designer.

== Biography ==
Alla Levashova was born in Moscow on 22 March 1918. She graduated from the Moscow Textile Institute in 1941. She later played an important role in establishing the department of fashion designers at this institute.After completing her education, she joined at the Stanislavsky Moscow Opera and Drama Studio as a production designer. Later she moved to All-Union Model House, where she began a new career in fashion designing.

In 1966 she became director for the newly created Special Designing Bureau (SKhKB) in the Ministry of Light Industry. She established contact with number of popular fashion design houses in other countries including Christian Dior, and led the official Soviet delegation on visits.In Paris, she personally met the popular French designer Yves Saint Laurent, who was the artistic director of Christian Dior.

In 1962, Levashova succeeded in creating the Special Art and Design Bureau of the Ministry of Light Industry (SHKB) and became its director and artistic director. Levashova assigned a decisive role to fashion designers capable of working in industry. Collection planning was based on the actual production of textile mills, knitwear, accessories, etc. SKHKB was the first enterprise in the country where the three-stage system of fashion production was applied. Also in SKHKB for the first time in the USSR the method of one basis was realized - creation of a series of models-variants on the basis of one pattern. The collections are updated by means of fabrics and decorations without introducing a fundamentally new cut. The method allows to easily reorganize production and increase the choice of fashionable goods.

In her writings, she advocated the need for creating “clothes for everyone,” and emphasised on the importance of designing clothes for “broad masses.” Under her leadership, the Special Designing Bureau facilitated the production of garments that were “inexpensive and accessible to ordinary people.”

Her fashion designing models reflected the combination of “elegance and simplicity.” She also actively promoted the “idea of central control of Soviet fashion industry” in which the local industries at different locations adopted the mass design solutions developed by an office at the federal level.

She is being considered as “one of the Soviet Union’s leading fashion designers.”

She died in Moscow on 3 March 1974.
