= Operation Moolah =

US Air Force effort to obtain a Soviet MiG-15

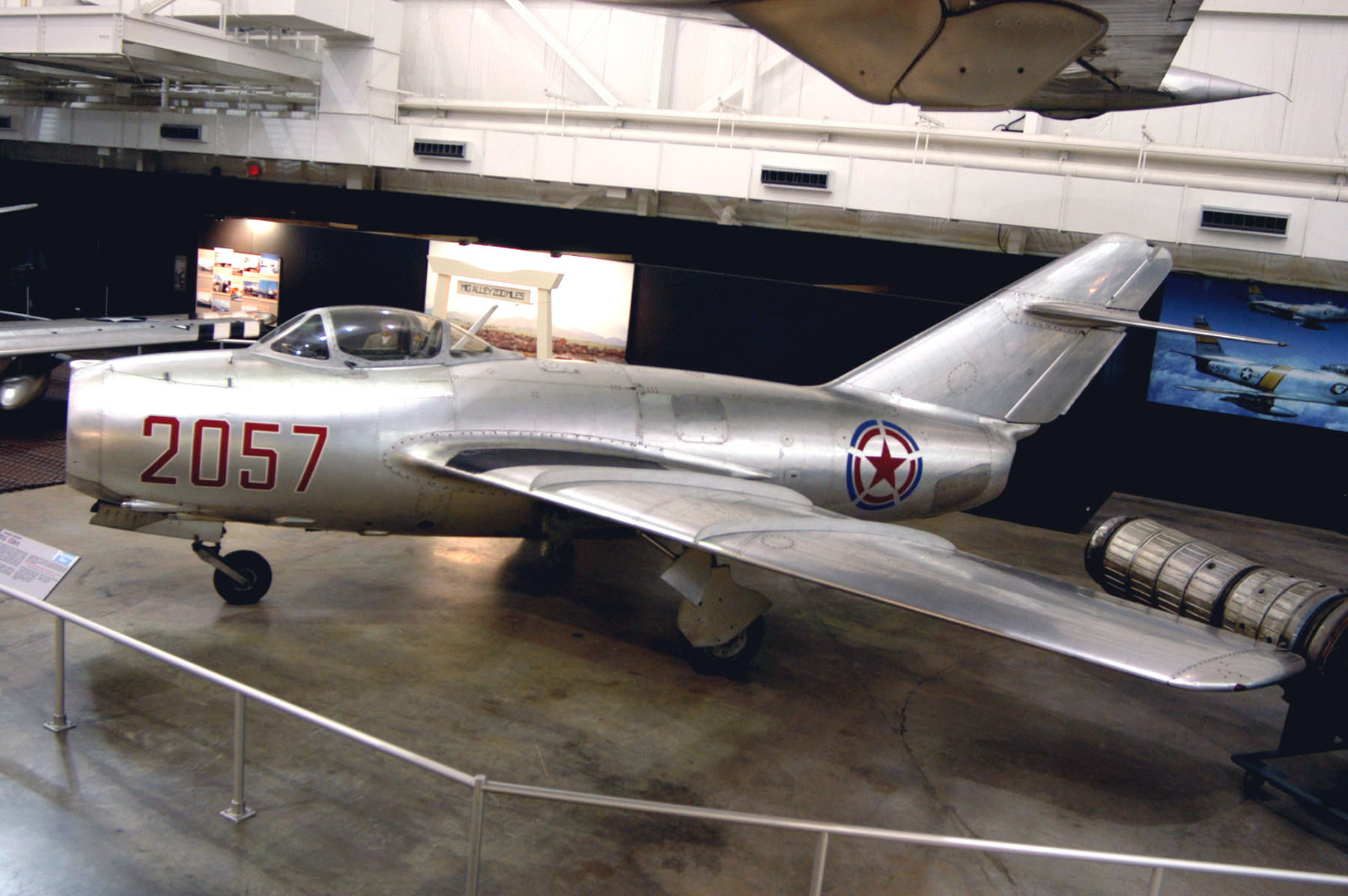
MiG-15 in the Korean War Gallery at the National Museum of the United States Air Force.

Operation Moolah was a United States Air Force (USAF) effort during the Korean War to obtain through defection a fully capable MiG-15 jet fighter, which was at the time the Soviet Union's best fighter. Communist forces introduced the MiG-15 to Korea on November 1, 1950. USAF pilots reported that the performance of the MiG-15 was superior to that of United Nations aircraft, including the USAF's new F-86 Sabre. The operation focused on influencing Communist pilots to defect to South Korea with a MiG for a financial reward. The success of the operation is disputable since no Communist pilot defected before the armistice was signed on July 27, 1953. On September 21, 1953, North Korean pilot Lieutenant No Kum-Sok flew his MiG-15 to the Kimpo Air Base, South Korea, unaware of Operation Moolah.

== Background ==
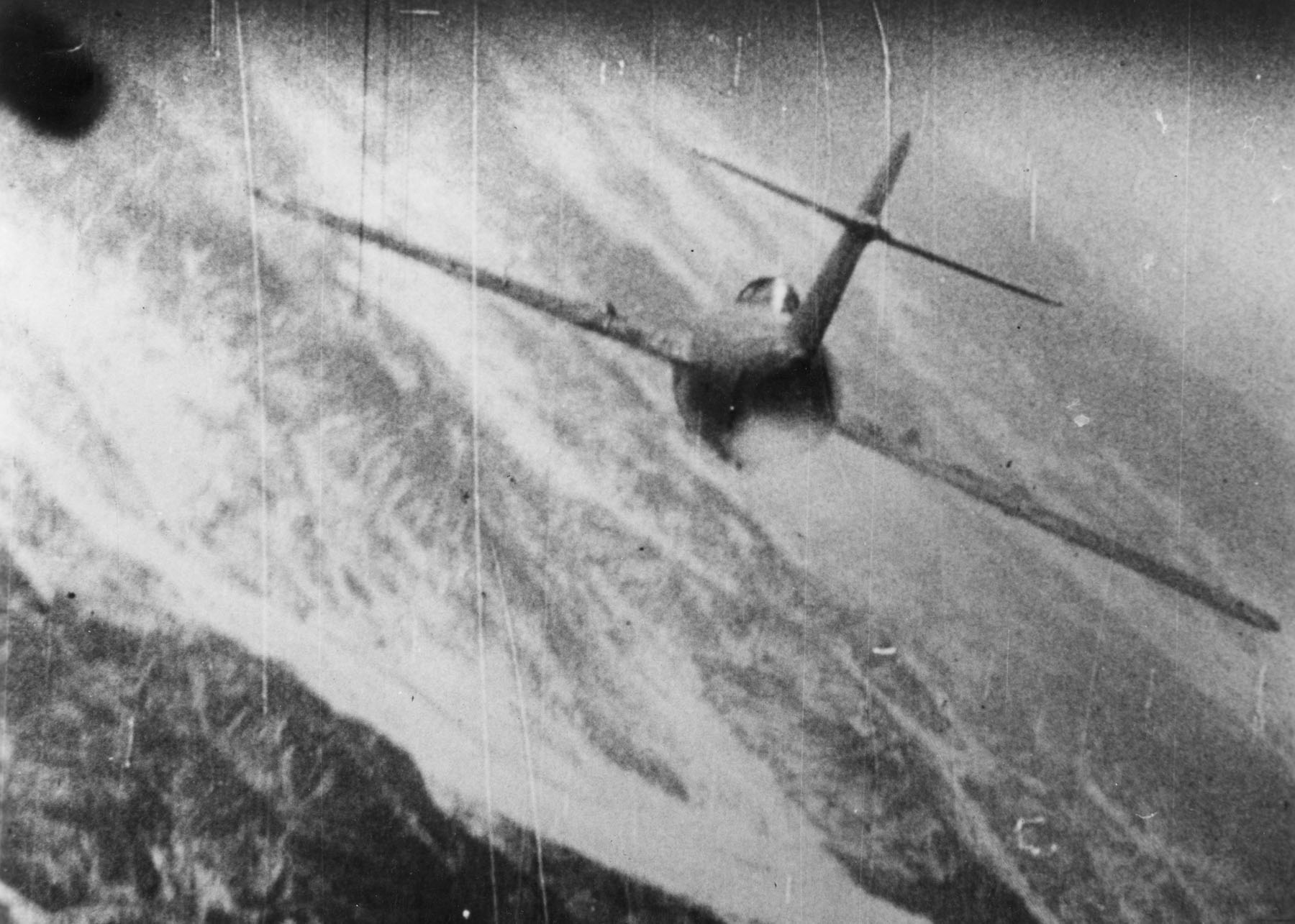
Gun camera photo of a MiG-15 being attacked by a USAF fighter.

The arrival of Soviet-made MiG-15s over the Korean peninsula in November 1950 initially placed United Nations aircraft, especially the USAF F-86 Sabre, at a disadvantage. In a dogfight, the MiG-15 could out-accelerate the F-86, including in a dive, even though the Sabre had higher terminal velocity. The MiG was more maneuverable above 10,000 m (33,000 ft), although the F-86 was more maneuverable below that altitude. The MiG-15 was armed with a heavy 37mm cannon that could shoot down USAF bombers. U.S. planners at the Strategic Air Command (SAC) were aware of the cannon but knew little more about the technical aspects of the aircraft, including flight performance. By the end of the war, UN air forces had gained ascendancy over the MiGs due to superior tactics, techniques, and procedures (TTPs), better-trained pilots, upgraded Sabres, and especially due to the withdrawal of Soviet pilots from the conflict.

The appearance of the MiG-15 over North Korea led to speculation about the Soviet Union's involvement in the Korean War. USAF pilots reported hearing Russian on the radio channels used by the MiG-15s. Before the November 1950 sighting of the MiG-15s by USAF pilots, Soviet MiG-15 regiments were stationed at the Moscow Air Defence District to protect the capital against NATO bombers.

Some UN prisoners of war reported talking to Soviet pilots while in captivity in North Korea. According to General Mark Clark, the commanding general of the UN Command had enough intelligence to claim that the Soviets were covertly lending their pilots in support of North Korean forces. According to Lieutenant No Kum-Sok, by February 1951, some half-a-dozen Soviet Air pilots visited North Korean pilots at their northeast China air base at Jilin. The plain clothes officers were there to investigate the ability of the North Korean pilots and determine if they were capable enough to fly the new MiG-15. By March, the Soviet 324th Fighter Air Division, led by Colonel Ivan Kozhedub, deployed to Jilin and began training the first class of North Korean air force pilots on the MiG-15. One month later, these same Russian pilots entered combat on behalf of North Korea, though internationally their involvement was never announced. The Soviets had gone to great lengths to hide their involvement in the war, including painting Chinese and North Korean insignia on their planes. By the end of the war, the Russians had provided half the aircraft and 5,000 pilots in support of the Communist war effort against the UN.

== Origins ==
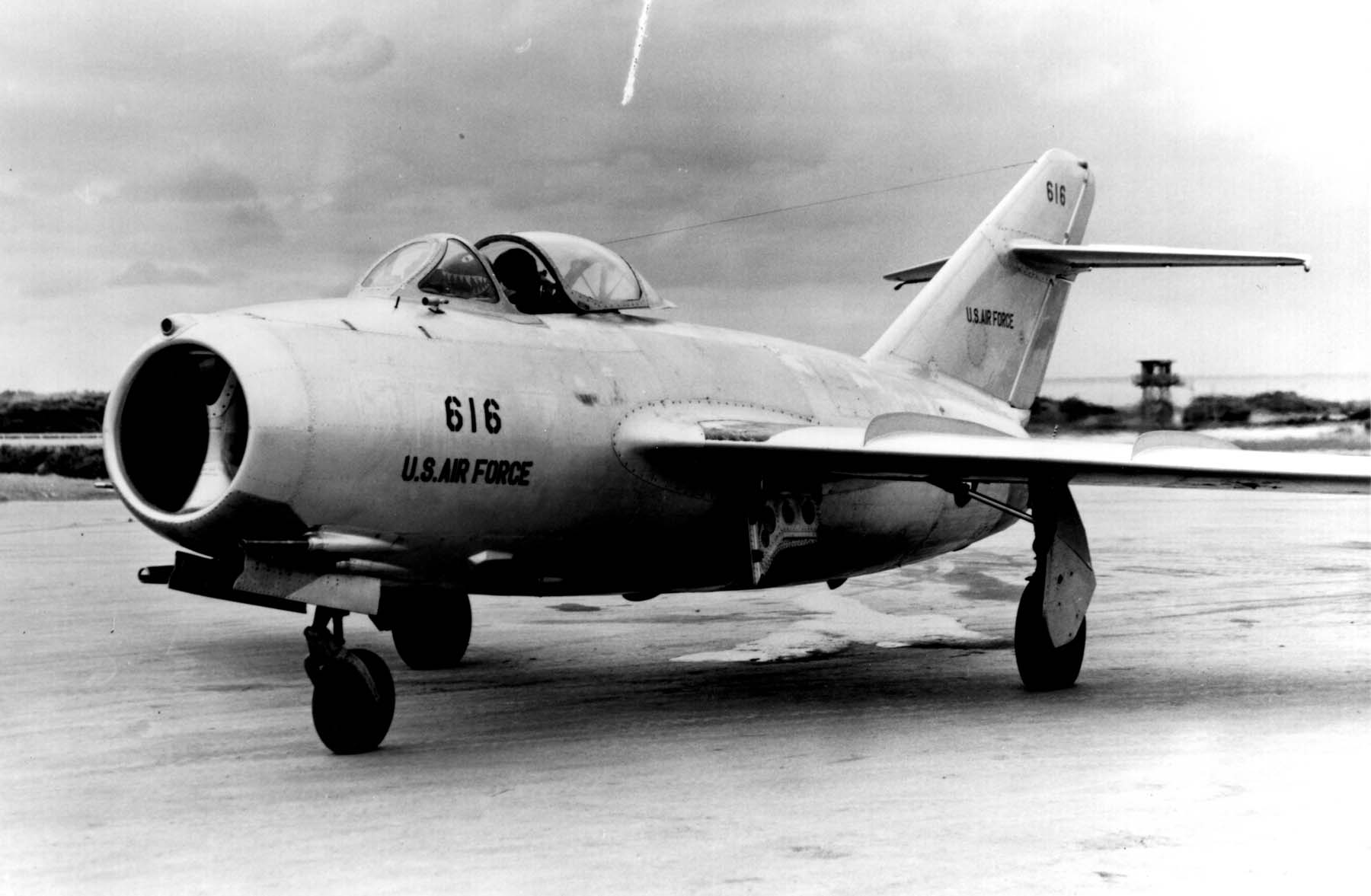
MiG-15 delivered by No Kum-Sok, a defecting North Korean pilot to the US Air Force

Speculation exists about the origin of Operation Moolah. According to Captain Alan Abner, the idea of the operation originated from his office at the Army's Psychological Warfare Branch, in Washington DC. According to intelligence reports that they received, dissatisfaction within the Soviet Air Force, even to the extent of some desertions by disgruntled pilots, led to the promising belief of possible future defections by some pilots. The plan set forth an offer of $100,000 (equivalent to $1,093,781 in 2022) for a Soviet MiG-15 and political asylum for the pilot. The plan was marked Top Secret and requested the offer be passed by rumor through ranks of Communist forces to ensure that the offer would not be attributable to the US. The plan was delivered to The Pentagon on a Monday, and by that Saturday, details of the plan had been published in The Washington Post with the title, "Gen. Mark Clark Offers $100,000 Reward for Russian Jet." Abner was disappointed because the article did not mention that his organization had conceived the plan.

A second version of this story originates from General Mark W. Clark. According to him, the origin of Operation Moolah was from a war correspondent closely associated with the general but was not identified in Clark's book, From the Danube to the Yalu. The war correspondent developed the idea of the metaphor "silver bullet" and its effect on the Chinese in early 1952. He then developed and wrote a fictitious interview between an "anonymous" and a nonexistent Air Force general suggesting the MiG reward. The Far East Air Force (FEAF) headquartered in Tokyo was given the fictitious interview and thought the idea was worth looking into and passed it onward to the Department of the Air Force in Washington, DC. The idea circulated the Pentagon and the Department of State until it was transmitted back to Clark from the Department of the Army through a message that he received in November 1952.

According to Herbert Friedman, the unidentified war correspondent was Edward Hymoff, the Bureau Chief of the International News Service and former World War II OSS veteran, whom he interviewed. Another source attributes the idea to Major Donald Nichols, commanding officer of the 6004th Air Intelligence Service Squadron.

== Execution ==
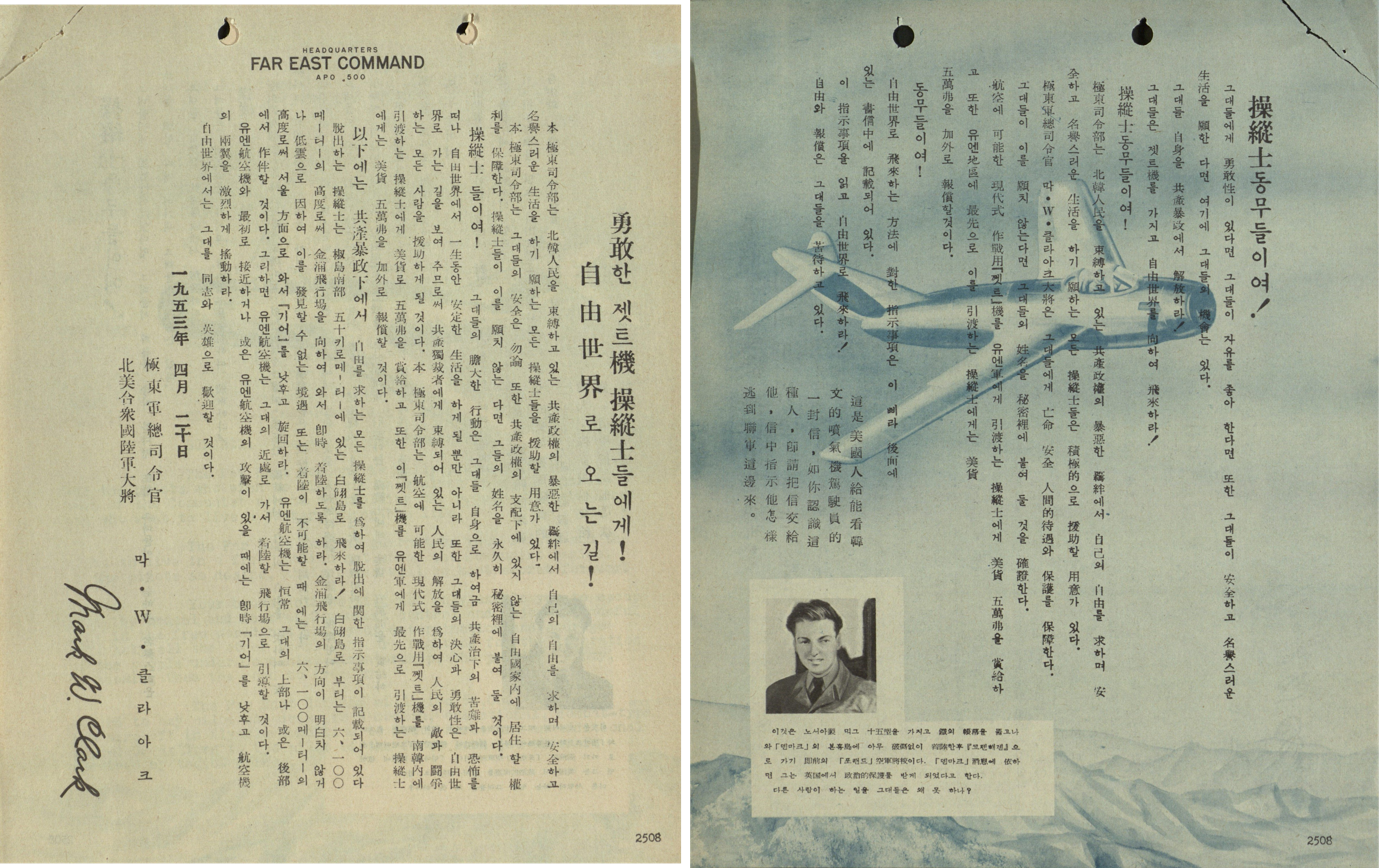
Operation Moolah propaganda leaflet promising a $100,000 reward to the first North Korean pilot to deliver a Soviet MiG-15 to UN forces

On March 20, 1953, the Joint Chiefs of Staff approved the plan. The approved operation was forwarded on April 1, 1953, to the Joint Psychological Committee at FEAF in Tokyo, Japan, where it was staffed, approved, and advanced to Clark. He dubbed the plan Operation Moolah. The plan offered $50,000 to any pilot who flew a fully mission capable MiG-15 to South Korea. The first pilot to defect would be awarded an additional $50,000. The plan also included complete political asylum, resettlement in a non-Communist country, and anonymity if desired.

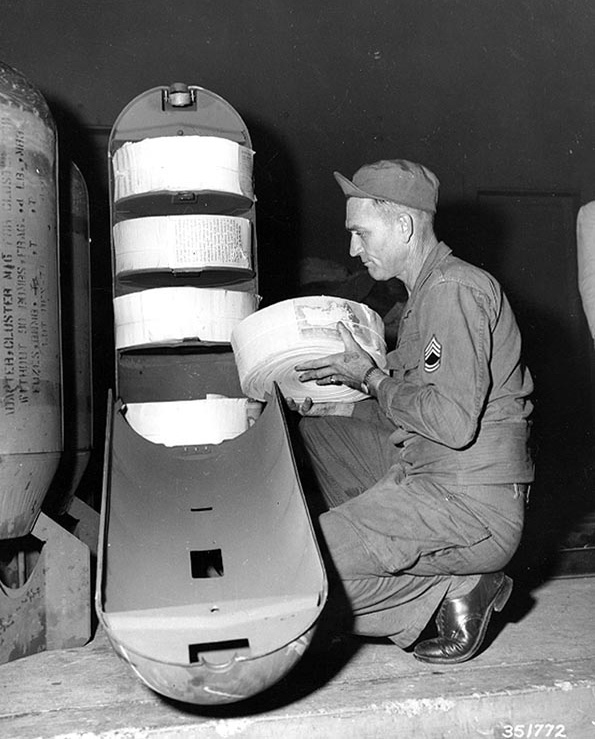
SFC Furl A. Krebs loads an M16A1 cluster adapter at the FEC (Far Eastern Command) Printing Plant, Yokohama, Japan. The bomb type adapter will contain 22,500 psychological warfare leaflets sized 5 by 8 inches (130 mm × 200 mm).

If such a defection occurred, the propaganda value would be significant to UN forces. The defection of the pilot would be articulated to the global audience that the pilot fled from the perils of Communism and a totalitarian regime for freedom in South Korea. The operation would also create North Korean and Chinese trepidation and mistrust of their pilots. A Soviet defection would provide vital intelligence and demonstrate the Soviet Union was an active participant in the war. UN forces would also have the opportunity to test the MiG-15s capabilities and establish procedures against the MiG-15's technical advantages over the F-86 Sabre.

On April 26, armistice negotiations between Communist forces and the UN began. Clark issued the offer of Operation Moolah on the 27th to coincide with Operation Little Switch, the exchange of sick and wounded POWs between the Communist and the UN forces. The timing was intentional because the US and South Korean President Syngman Rhee were not able to agree upon the conditions of the armistice. The intent of Operation Moolah was to discourage captured Communist forces from returning to North Korea or China. The effect was to demonstrate that Communist POWs were treated better under the care of UN forces and did not wish to return to their home country.

General Clark announced the offer on April 27, 1953, through a shortwave radio transmission. The transmission, translated into Korean, Mandarin, Cantonese, and Russian, was broadcast by 14 radio stations in Japan and South Korea into North Korea and China. Clark stated: "To all brave pilots who wish to free themselves from the Communist yoke and start a new, better life with proper honor ... you are guaranteed refuge, protection, humane care and attention. If pilots so desire, their names will be kept secret forever ..."

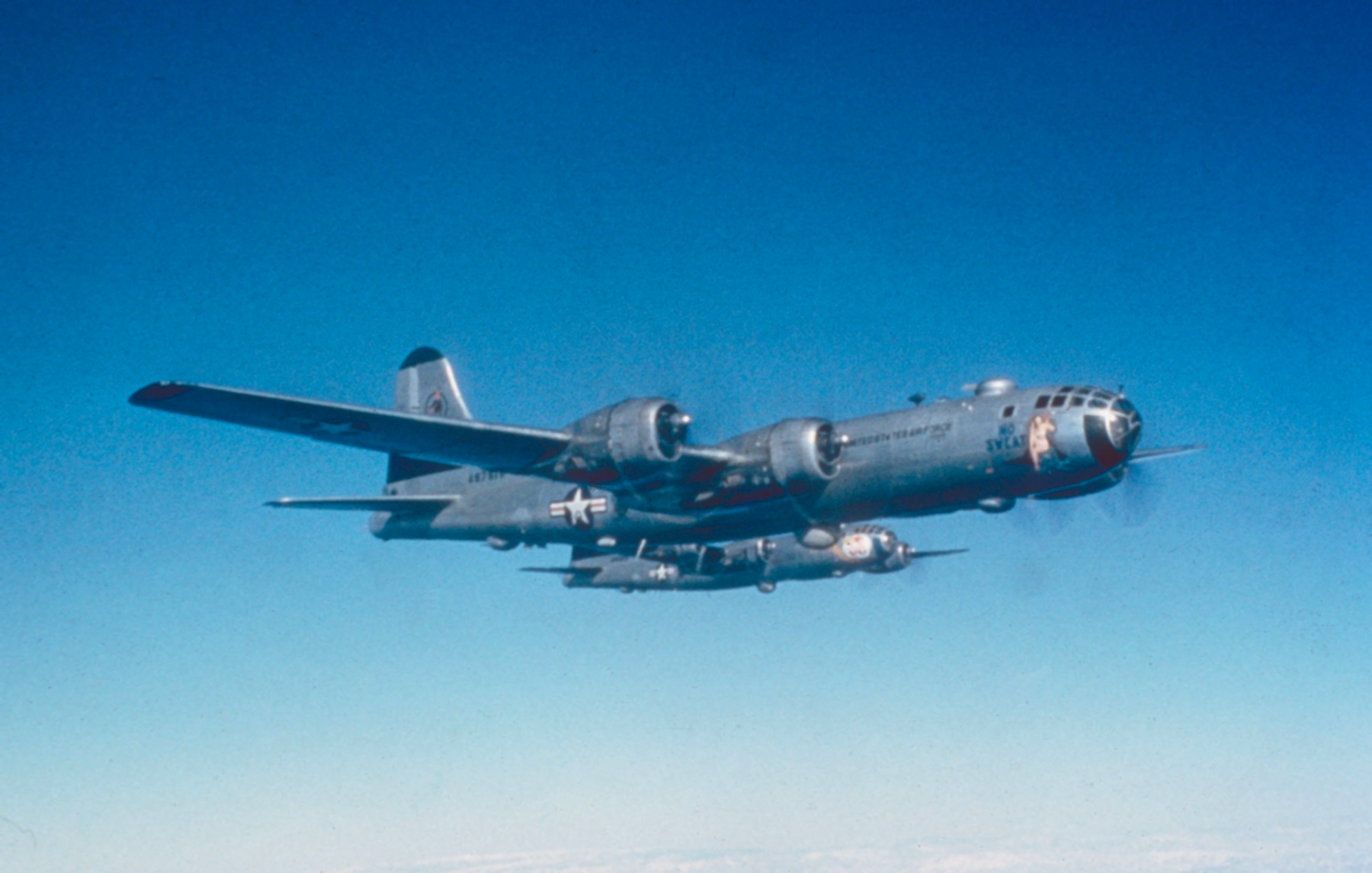
B-29 Superfortress in flight over Korea

On the night of April 26, 1953, two B-29 Superfortress bombers dropped 1.2 million leaflets over Communist bases in the Yalu River Basin. These leaflets were written in Russian, Chinese, and Korean. According to General Clark, immediately after the drop of the leaflets on April 26, UN aircraft did not make visual contact with any MiG aircraft for the following eight days. Though weather may have been a factor, he opines that the leaflets had a direct effect and believes that senior Communist military leaders began to screen for politically unreliable pilots. Incidentally, immediately after the leaflet drop in April, a radio-jamming transmitter whose location could not be identified began to jam all UN Russian-language broadcasts of Gen. Clark's MIG-15 offer, but Chinese and Korean broadcasts were unhindered.

On May 10, US B-29 bombers returned at night to drop an additional 40,000 Operation Moolah leaflets over the Sinuiju and Uiju Airfields. The UN broadcast the same message delivered by General Clark in April translated in Russian, Chinese, and Korean. That would be replicated on the evening of May 18, with an additional 90,000 leaflets.

MiG-15 flights were rumored to have decreased drastically or ceased after the April leaflet drop and radio broadcasts of the offer. However, it has been reported that MiG-15 sorties were suspended for eight days, but a large formation of approximately 166 MiG-15s was sighted on April 30. Thirty MiG-15s were sighted on May 1, forty-four on May 2, and from May 3 to 7, not a single MiG-15 was sighted, almost certainly because of poor weather conditions. One noticeable change was the paint pattern of the Communist aircraft. Prior to April 27, all MiG-15s were painted the same pattern as the Soviet air force, with the red star, but after the 27th, all Communist aircraft had Chinese and North Korean markings. On May 27, North Korean dictator Kim Il Sung gave a radio speech to the "heroes" of the North Korean Air Force that their country would assume a larger role in the defense of North Korean airspace. Kim also exhorted his countrymen to ensure military discipline and equipment is fortified to ensure victory against the UN forces.

According to Lieutenant No Kum-Sok, the North Korean pilot who defected after the Korean War was over, his vice battalion commander, Captain Kim Jung-Sup was summoned to Sinuiju, the North Korean Air Force headquarters in early May 1953 for one week. The purpose of his trip was unknown to No, but rumors had circulated throughout the command that Lieutenant No was under investigation, questioning his loyalty to the Democratic People's Republic of Korea. No continued to fly and assumed that his vice battalion commander had defended his loyalty to the Communist regime. Coincidentally, with the death of Soviet Premier Joseph Stalin on March 5, 1953, and the significant loss of Russian aircraft, the Soviet Union grounded and recalled their pilots from the Korean theater. The Soviet Union had gone to great lengths to disguise their involvement in the Korean War. Russian pilots were taught Mandarin in order to deceive UN pilots. USAF pilots noted after the 27th, they had not heard any Russian chatter on the intercoms of MiG-15s from the Soviet Union's "Honchos" pilots.

Between May 8–31, 56 MiG-15s were destroyed with only one F-86 loss in the same period. USAF pilots noticed that Communist pilots who observed USAF aircraft flying near their airspace prior to any engagement, bailed from their aircraft to ensure their personal survival.

General Clark received reports of the poor quality of Communist pilots after the leaflet drops of Operation Moolah, their worst piloting of the war. Communist pilots flew fewer sorties in the 90 days after Operation Moolah than in the 90 days before the first leaflet drop. UN pilots shot down 155 MiG-15s with a loss of only three F-86 aircraft during that period.

The Korean Armistice Agreement was signed on July 27, 1953, ceasing all combat operations. Not one single pilot had defected to South Korea. The effectiveness of Operation Moolah was difficult to assess. Though UN forces did not recover a single MiG-15 aircraft, Operation Moolah had residual effects on Communist forces. There is some evidence to believe that the Soviet Union feared a defection from its pilots more than the Chinese or North Korean regimes. US intelligence reports indicated that Soviet Far Eastern audiences were shown films depicting the failure of US intelligence agents bribing the crew and passengers of a Czech plane into defecting to the west. Presumably the Russians may have well believed that the UN reward offer would appeal to airmen from their satellite countries in the Warsaw Bloc.

The leaflets used in Operation Moolah carried the photo of Lieutenant Franciszek Jarecki, who had flown his Lim2 (license version of MiG 15bis) from Poland to political asylum in Denmark in March 1953.

== Aftermath ==
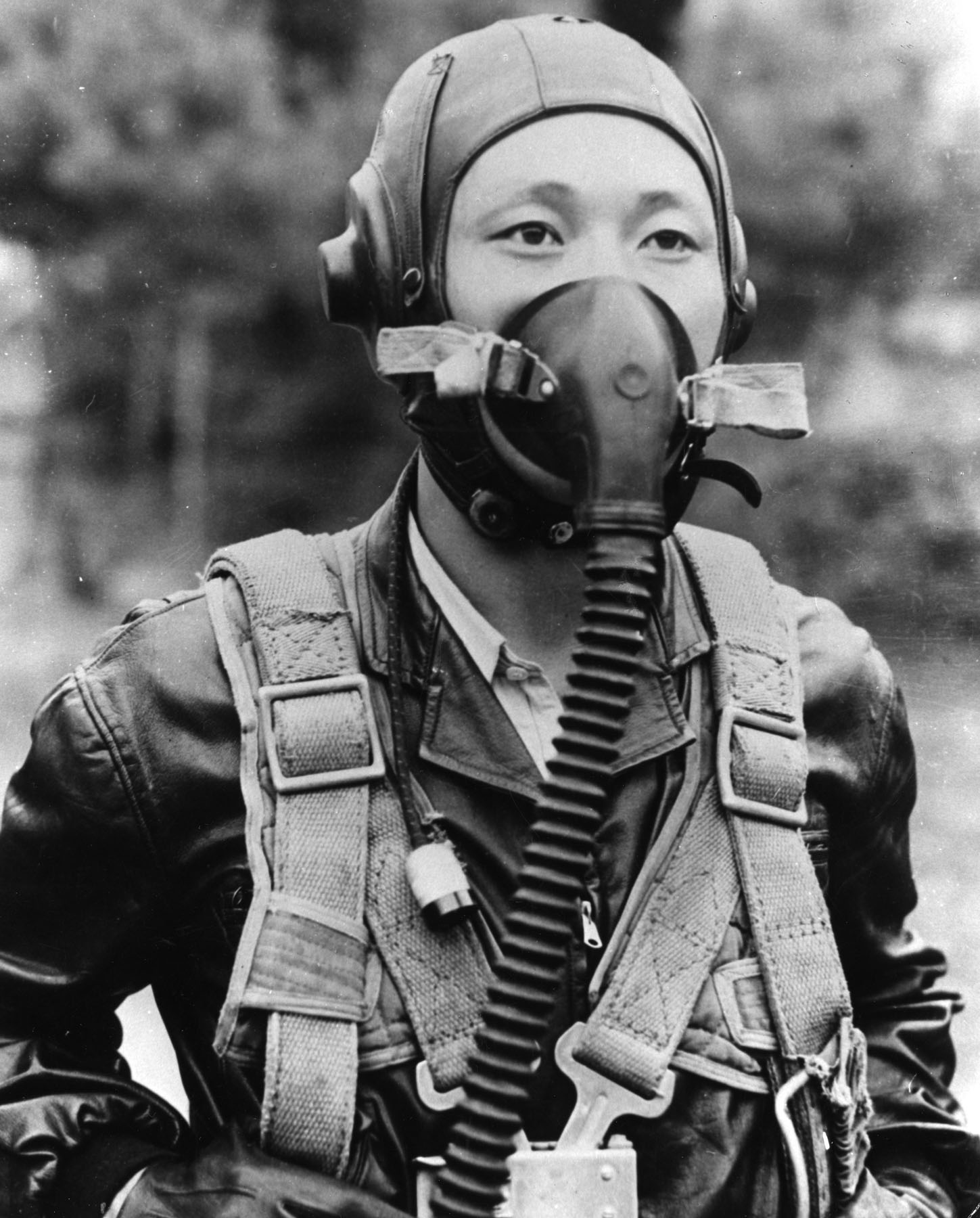
MiG-15 pilot Lieutenant No Kum-Sok, pictured in 1953 wearing typical North Korean flight clothing.

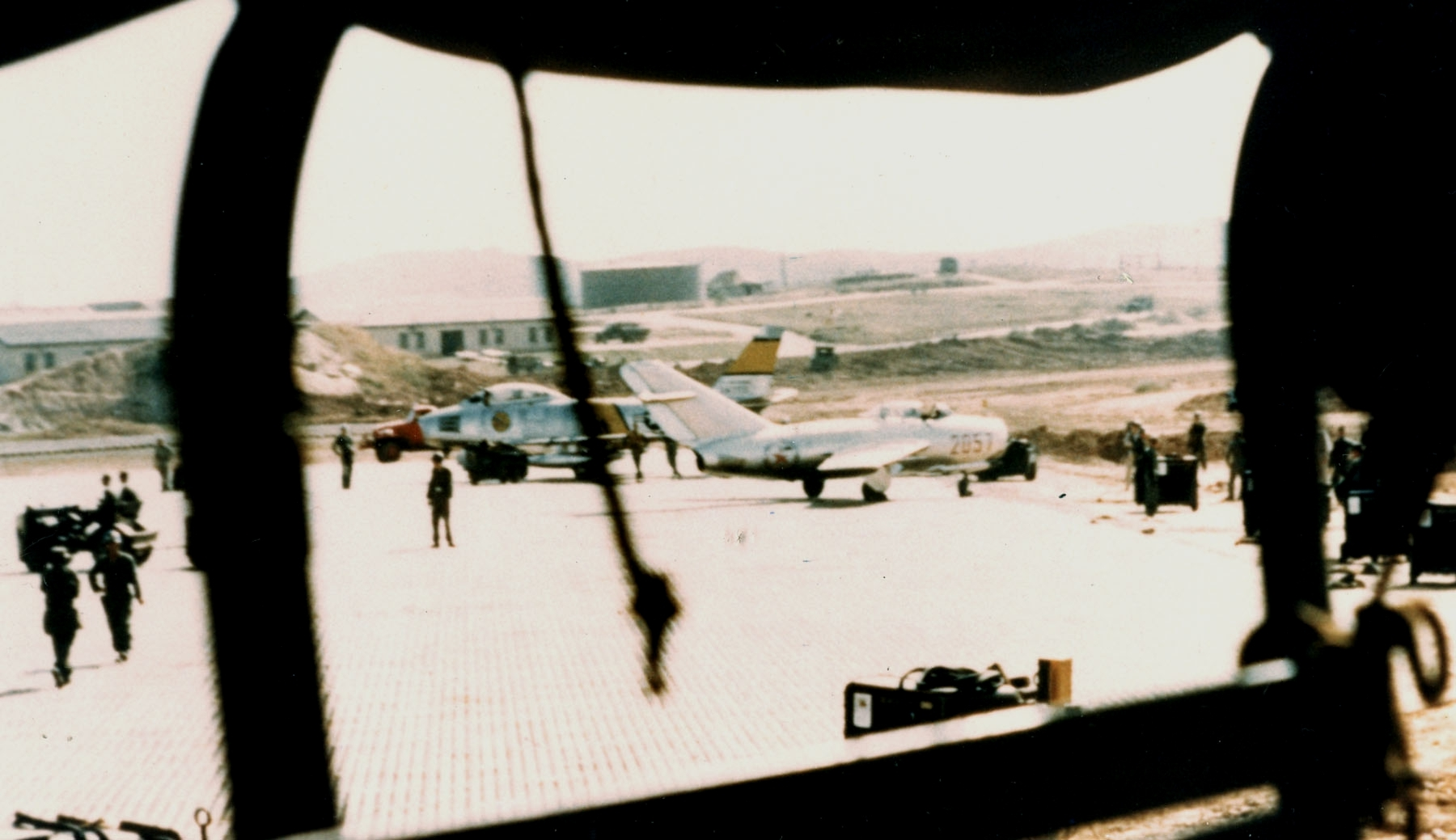
No Kum-Sok's MiG-15, minutes after landing at Kimpo.

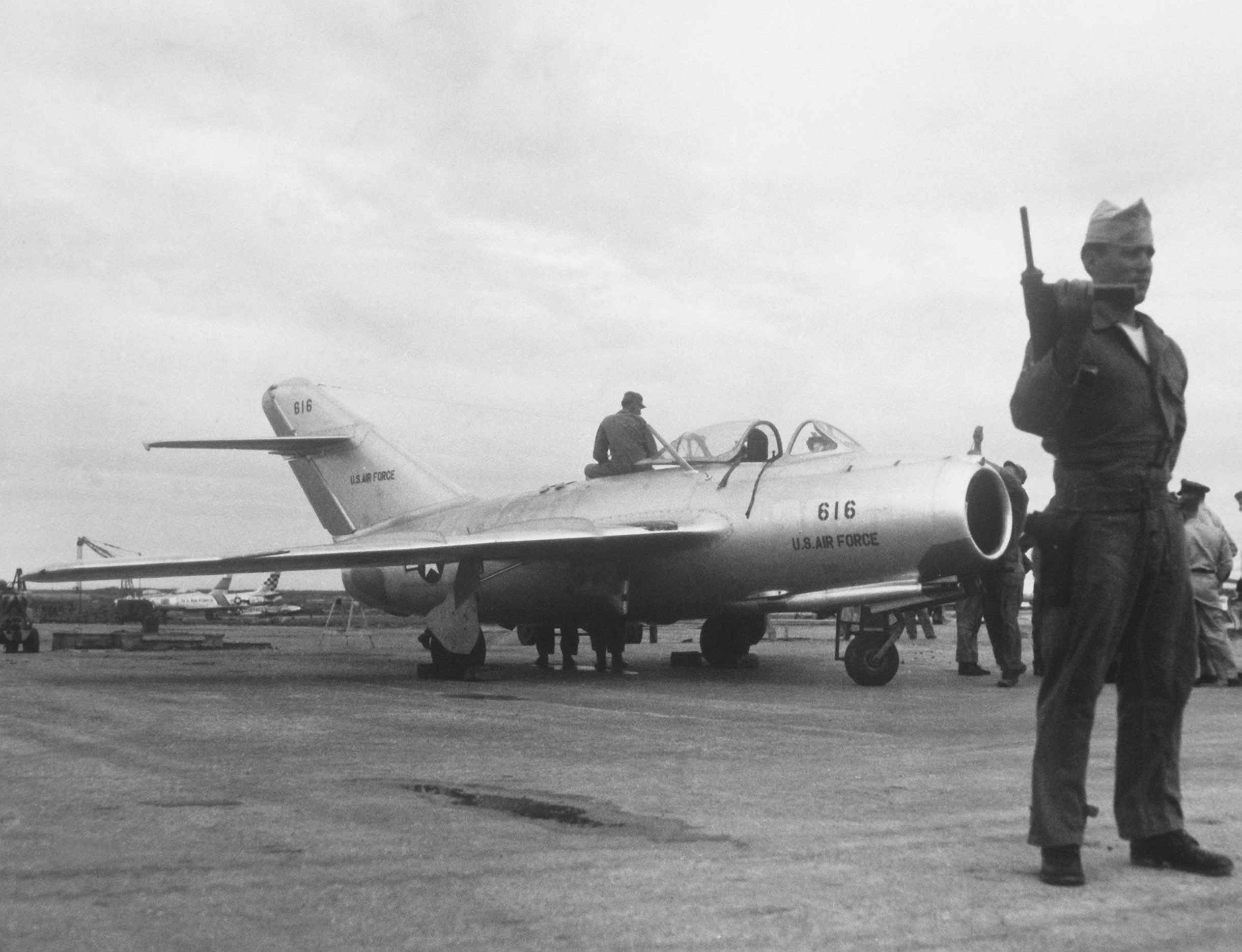
Repainted in USAF markings and insignia, the MiG-15b is under guard and awaiting flight-testing at Okinawa.

Early in the morning on September 21, 1953, Lieutenant No Kum-Sok flew a MiG-15bis, bort number 'Red 2057', of the 2nd Regiment, Korean People's Air Force, from Sunan Air Base, just outside Pyongyang, North Korea and landed before 10:00 a.m. at Kimpo Air Base in South Korea. He was immediately taken into the base headquarters for interrogation and physical examination. Shortly afterwards, he was taken by helicopter to a secluded US military base at Oryu-dong, just outside Seoul, where the Fifth Air Force Intelligence Office was located. His aircraft was disassembled and loaded onto a C-124 Globemaster and shipped off the next day to Kadena Air Base on Okinawa. The next morning, South Korean newspapers mentioned the defecting North Korean pilot and his award of $100,000. No, though, was unaware of Operation Moolah and its rewards. No was later advised by the Central Intelligence Agency (CIA) to decline the reward money in exchange for paid education at an American college of his choosing. President Dwight D. Eisenhower did not support Operation Moolah. He thought it unethical to offer money to a defector and was concerned about the North Korean reaction to the defection due to the uneasy armistice agreement.

One of his handlers from the CIA was Larry Chin, who was arrested by the Federal Bureau of Investigation (FBI) in 1985 for spying. In the aftermath of No's defection, five of his fellow pilots were executed.

According to No, the reward would not have motivated any North Korean pilots to defect, for a number of reasons. First, the offer made available in April 1953 was advertised through leaflets dropped at North Korean air bases on the Yalu River. However, at that point in the war, all Russian, Chinese, and North Korean MiG-15s were stationed in Manchuria, so it was unlikely that any MiG-15 pilots had seen the leaflets. Secondly, even if the USAF had dropped leaflets in Manchuria, a North Korean pilot would not have trusted the authenticity of the offer. Nor were North Korean pilots generally aware of the purchasing power of the American dollar. Had Operation Moolah instead guaranteed freedom and a job in the United States, it would have been viewed as a more tempting offer.

Even though it was not directly influenced by Operation Moolah, No's defection did allow the USAF insight into the aircraft and the state of the northern air forces. For the next several months, No answered numerous questions related to North Korea's military and the support it received from the Soviet Union and China. He also provided valuable insight to American test pilots prior to their evaluation of the MiG at Kadena Air Base. The test pilots were Major Chuck Yeager and Captain Harold "Tom" Collins, led by Major General Albert Boyd, the commander of the Wright Air Development Center. Major Yeager later stated, "Flying the MiG-15 is the most demanding situation I have ever faced. It's a quirky airplane that has killed a lot of its pilots."

Testing of the MiG-15 lasted 11 days. It revealed that the aircraft was a reasonably good fighter, but lacked the technological sophistication of American aircraft, such as the F-86. Major Yeager was able to fly the aircraft to 0.98 Mach before it became dangerously uncontrollable. While the MiG-15 did have a faster climb rate and operated in a higher altitude ceiling than the F-86, it suffered from problems with oscillation, poor pressurization, unexpected pitch-up at high speeds, unrecoverable spins, sudden stalls, and a particularly dangerous emergency fuel pump that could cause the aircraft to explode if improperly activated. Despite such shortcomings, Yeager and Collins determined that the MiG-15 and F-86 were equally capable. Pilot experience and training proved to be the most important factor during dogfights. Maj. Yeager said, "The pilot with the most experience will whip your ass no matter what you're flying!"

After the testing of the MiG-15bis, it was again disassembled and each part was scrutinized and evaluated by engineers. The Americans offered to return the aircraft to North Korea, but there was no response. The MiG-15 was crated and shipped to Wright-Patterson Air Force Base, in Dayton, Ohio, in February 1954. From March to October 1954, the MiG-15bis, was tested at Eglin AFB, Florida. It was flown extensively in comparisons with the B-36, B-47, F-84 and F-86 before returning to Wright-Patterson AFB, Ohio, in October. Further evaluation of the aircraft continued until it was damaged in a hard landing in 1956. The aircraft was donated to the National Museum of the US Air Force for restoration and display, where it remains.

== Example for future psychological operations ==
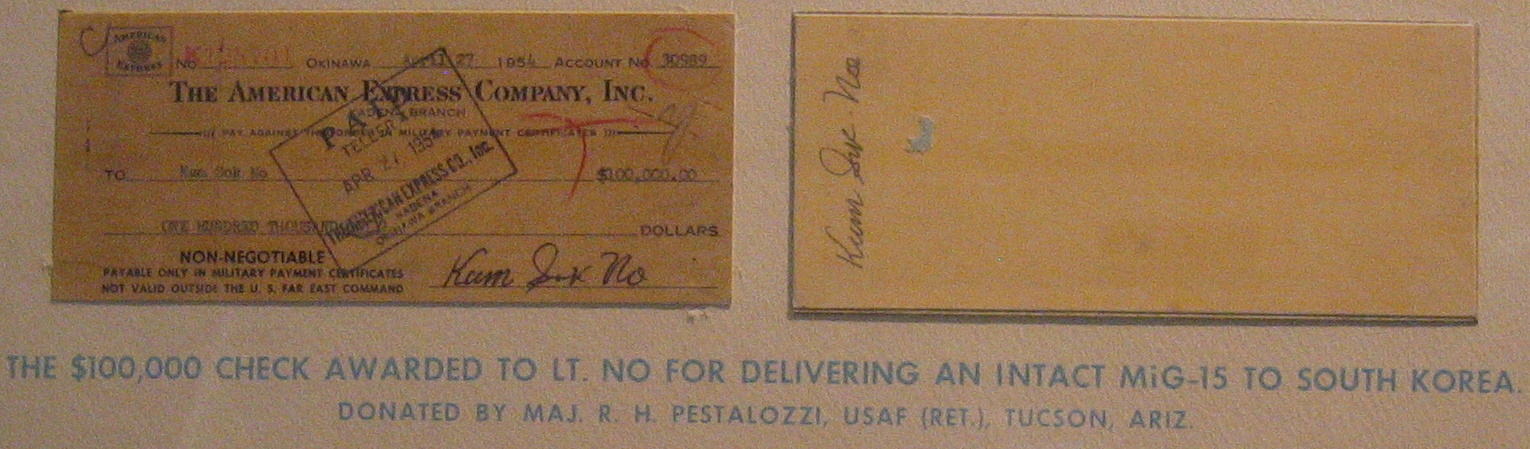
The $100,000 check awarded to No Kum-Sok as a reward for bringing the MiG-15 to South Korea.

Operation Moolah has been replicated multiple times since 1953. The Kuomintang, Chinese nationalists, dropped leaflets over mainland China, offering 28 to 113 kilograms (1,000 to 4,000 oz) of gold to Communist Chinese pilots who defected to Taiwan. The more modern the aircraft, the more gold the defecting pilot would receive. In 1966, the Joint Chiefs of Staff approved Operation Fast Buck, an exact replica of Operation Moolah, to secure a MiG-21 and the Soviet Mil Mi-6 "Hook" helicopter. Other goals of this operation were also to acquire intelligence, force the government of North Vietnam to evaluate the loyalty of its pilots and reduce MiG sorties. Operation Diamond, a Mossad covert operation, was similar to Operation Fast Buck; an Iraqi MiG-21 pilot successfully defected, and the captured MiG was evaluated by the Israeli Air Force, USAF, and the US Navy.

== Portrayal in fiction ==
In Episode 243 of Season 11 of M*A*S*H, a lightly wounded North Korean pilot winds up at the 4077 M*A*S*H. He landed due to engine trouble, with no intention of defecting, but an Army PR man offers him a deal very much like Operation Moolah, even citing Gen. Mark Clark by name.

In the 1983 film Under Fire, fictional characters portrayed by Nick Nolte and Ed Harris discuss a leaflet drop in Africa offering a new home and swimming pool to any opposition pilot who defects. Nolte's character says it is a false offer but Harris counters that its effect is to ground the opposition air force - air force superiors will not allow their aircraft to fly for fear of the pilots defecting.

Lieutenant No's defection was the subject of a mission in Chuck Yeager's Air Combat, a 1991 combat flight simulator.
