= Albert Boyd =

United States Air Force general (1906–1976)

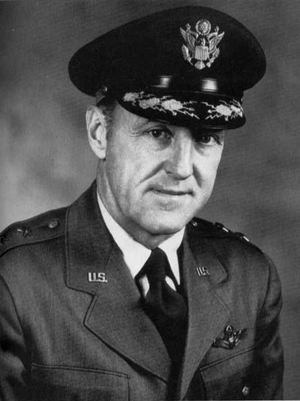
- Major General Albert Boyd (USAF Photo)
- Born: November 22, 1906; Rankin, Tennessee, U.S.
- Died: September 18, 1976 (aged 69)
- Burial place: Arlington National Cemetery
- Military career
- Allegiance: United States of America
- Branch: United States Air Force
- Service years: 1927–1957
- Rank: Major general
- Nickname: Al
- Commands: Chief of Flight Section, Wright-Patterson AFB; Commander, Experimental Test Pilot School; Commander, USAF Flight Test Center at Edwards AFB; Commander, Wright Air Development Center; Deputy Commander, Weapons System Headquarters, ARDC
- Awards: Legion of Merit; Distinguished Flying Cross; Distinguished Service Medal

Albert G Boyd (November 22, 1906 – September 18, 1976) was a pioneering test pilot for the United States Air Force (USAF). During his 30-year career, he logged more than 23,000 hours of flight time in 723 military aircraft (total aircraft, not types of aircraft). When he retired in 1957, he had flown every aircraft type operated by the USAF, including attack, cargo, trainer, fighter, experimental, bomber, mission trainer, liaison, observation, and general aviation planes and helicopters.

From 1947 to 1957, Boyd flew and approved every aircraft type acquired by the USAF. When he retired, he was praised as the "Father of Modern Flight Testing," "World's Number One Test Pilot," "Dean of American Test Pilots" and "Father of USAF Test Pilots."

His assignments included:

- Chief of Flight Section at Wright-Patterson AFB
- Commander of Experimental Test Pilot School
- First commander of USAF Flight Test Center at Edwards Air Force Base
- Commander of Wright Air Development Center (Maj. Chuck Yeager, a test pilot in his command, was the first American pilot to test the MiG-15, associated with Operation Moolah.)
- Deputy commander of Weapons System Headquarters, Air Research and Development Command
- Commanding general of Edwards AFB

Boyd piloted the prototype Lockheed P-80 Shooting Star, modified as a racer and designated P-80R, to 623.73 mph (1,004.2 km/h) on 19 June 1947. This was recognised as an official air speed record, although this speed had already been exceeded by the Me 163 and Me 262 in 1944. Along with Major General Harold E. "Tom" Collins, and Chuck Yeager, Boyd was the first American to pilot an intact Mig-15

Boyd led the newly formed Air Force's X-1 supersonic flight program and chose Chuck Yeager to pilot the plane. Yeager described Boyd as a strict disciplinarian who would enforce USAF uniform regulations, often with a very loud voice. "You might be his star pilot, but Lord help you if you came before him in his office with an un-shined belt buckle", Yeager said. Boyd was highly respected by his subordinates.

Boyd died on September 18, 1976. He and his wife Anna Lu (1907–1981) are buried at Arlington National Cemetery.

== Awards ==
- Octave Chanute Award
- Legion of Merit
- Distinguished Flying Cross
- Distinguished Service Medal
- Air Power Trophy
- Schilling Award
- Médaille de l'Aéronautique
- Brevet Militarire de Pilote d'Aviation
- Aerospace Walk of Honor (1991)
- Inducted into the National Aviation Hall of Fame in 1984.
