= No Kum-sok =

Korean-American aviator (1932–2022)

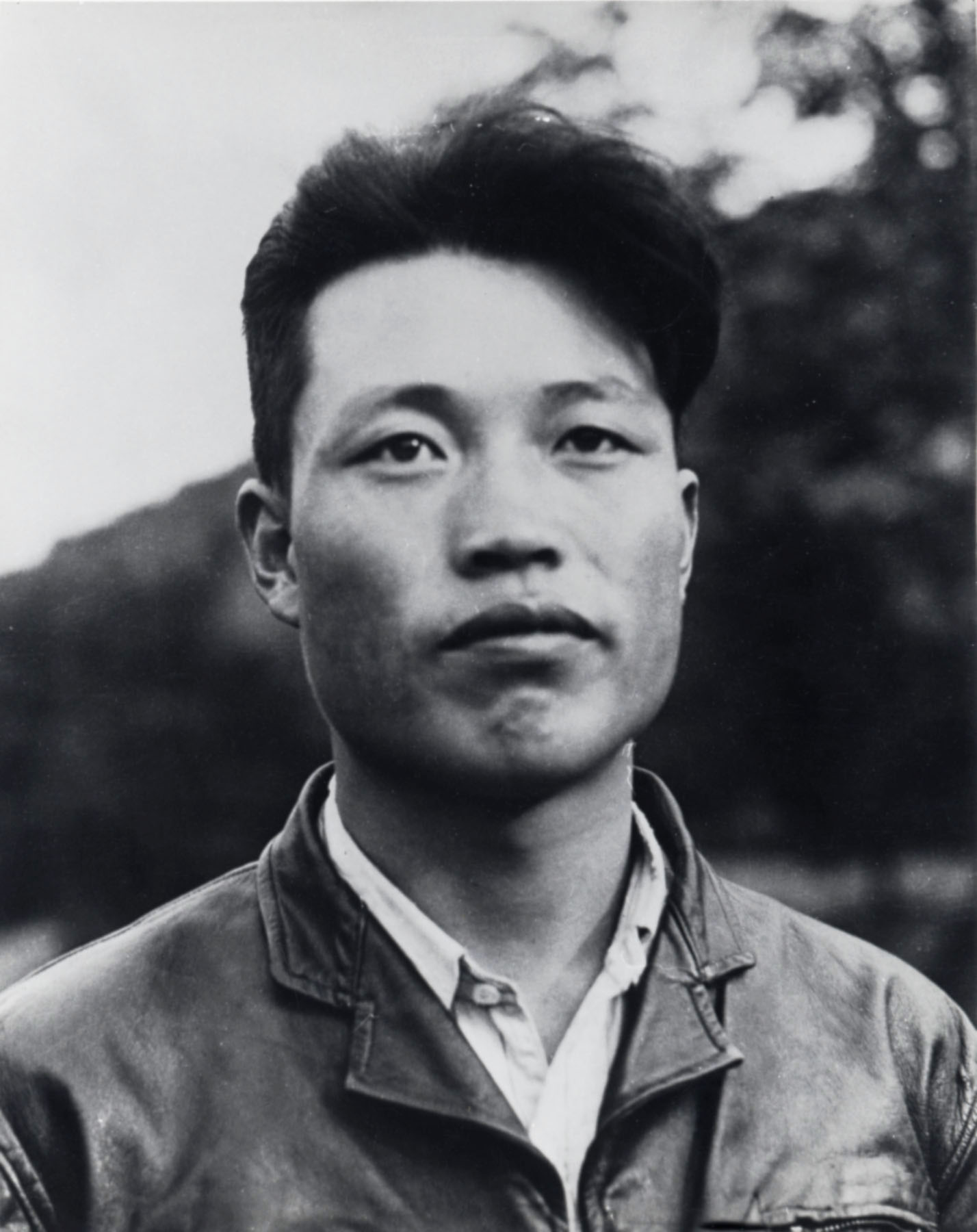
- No in 1953
- Born: No Kum-sok; January 10, 1932; Shinko, Kankyōnan-dō, Korea, Empire of Japan (now Sinhung County, South Hamgyong Province, North Korea)
- Died: December 26, 2022 (aged 90); Daytona Beach, Florida, U.S.
- Military career
- Allegiance: North Korea (defected)
- Branch: Korean People's Army Air Force; Korean People's Navy
- Service years: 1949–1953
- Rank: Senior lieutenant
- Conflicts: Korean War

- No Kum-sok
- Hangul: 노금석
- Hanja: 盧今錫
- RR: No Geumseok
- MR: No Kŭmsŏk

No Kum-sok (Korean: 노금석; January 10, 1932 – December 26, 2022) was a North Korean–born American engineer and aviator who served as a senior lieutenant in the Korean People's Army Air and Anti-Air Force during the Korean War. Under colonial rule, No was required to adopt a Japanese name, Okamura Kiyoshi. Approximately two months after the end of hostilities, he defected to South Korea in a MiG-15 aircraft, and was subsequently granted political asylum in the United States. He then adopted the English name Kenneth H. Rowe.

== Early life and education ==
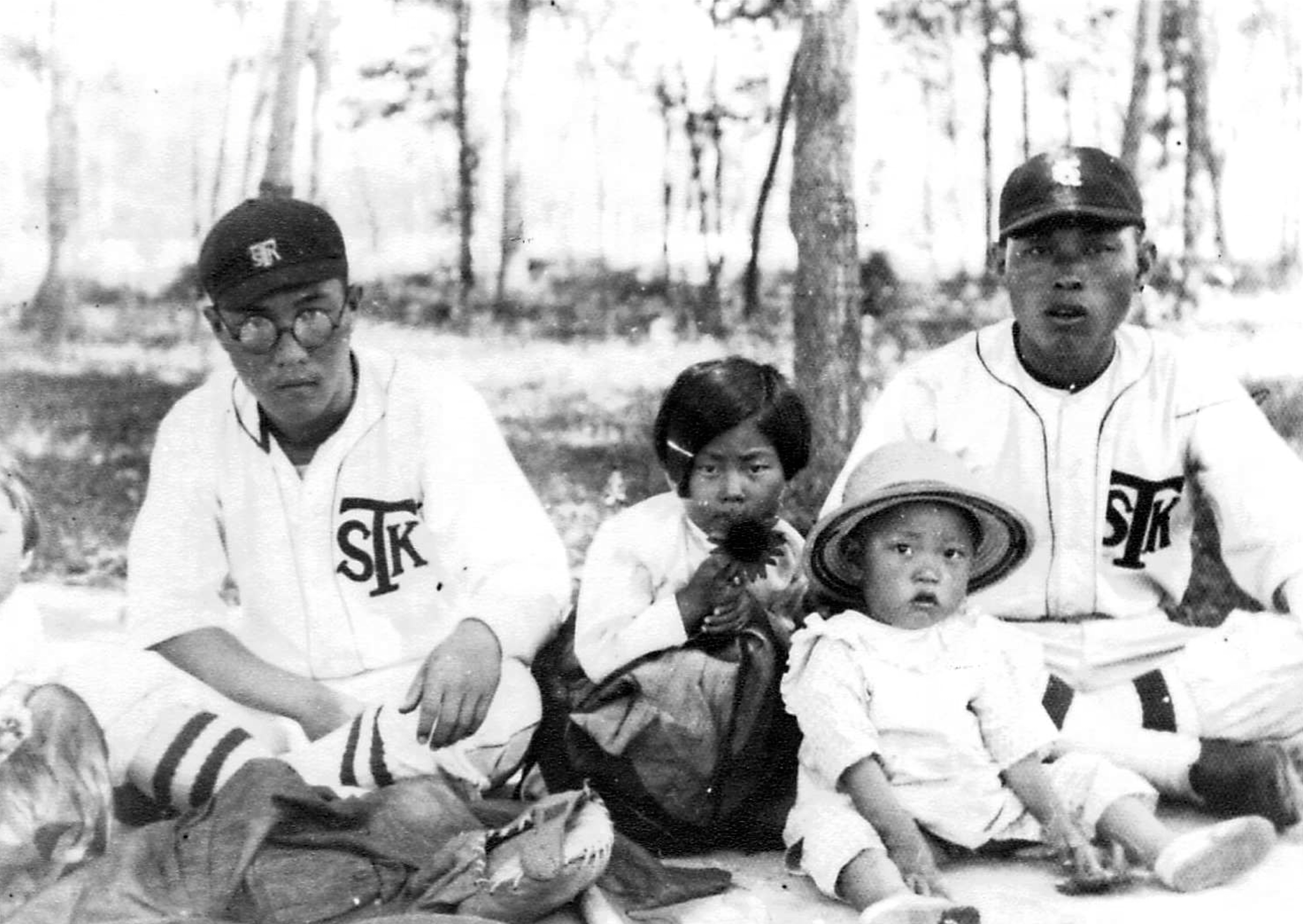
No as a toddler in 1935, with his father, who was a baseball player.

No was born on January 10, 1932, in Shinko, Kankyōnan-dō, Korea, Empire of Japan (now in North Korea).

During World War II, No supported Japan and considered becoming a kamikaze pilot, but his father was adamantly against it. No's support for Imperial Japan waned, and he became pro-American, though he had to hide these views due to the dangers of being recognized in northern Korea at the time.

According to No, he attended a speech by Kim Il Sung in early 1948 as a teenager; although No was opposed to communism, he found Kim to be a capable orator. However, No had to keep his anti-Communist views hidden, due to the danger of what would happen if North Korean authorities had found out about them.

== Career ==
A U.S. newsreel from 1954 covering No's arrival in the country.

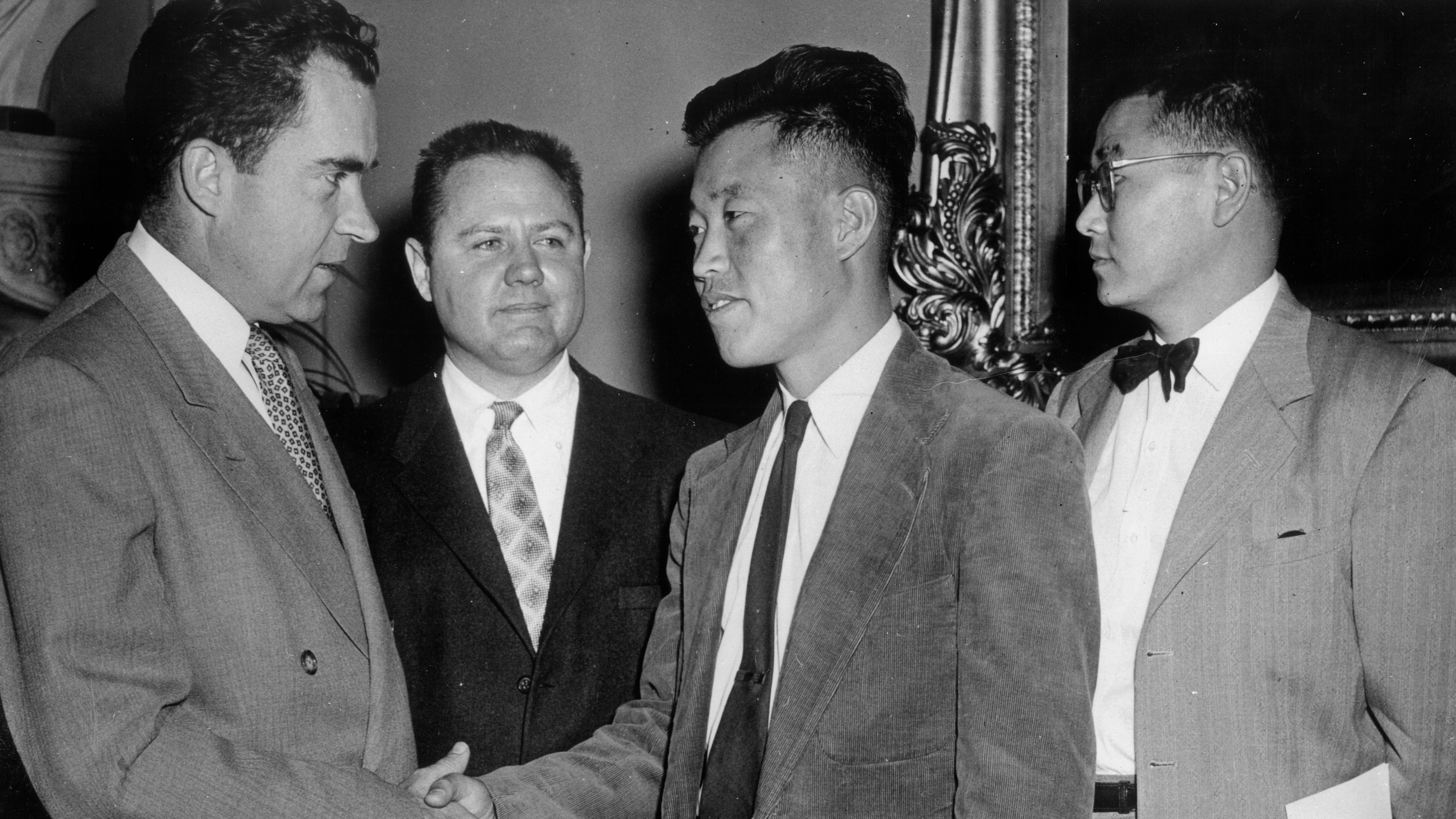
No meeting with Vice President Richard Nixon at the U.S. Capitol in May 1954.

=== Korean War ===
During the Korean War, No applied to join the Korean People's Navy and was accepted after he lied in the selection test. At the naval academy, No won the favor of his history professor who later helped No in the pilot selection test. After passing the selection test, No was promoted to ensign, and brought to Manchuria for flight training. He subsequently received promotion to the rank of lieutenant and then to senior lieutenant. He flew more than 100 combat missions during the war.

=== Defection ===
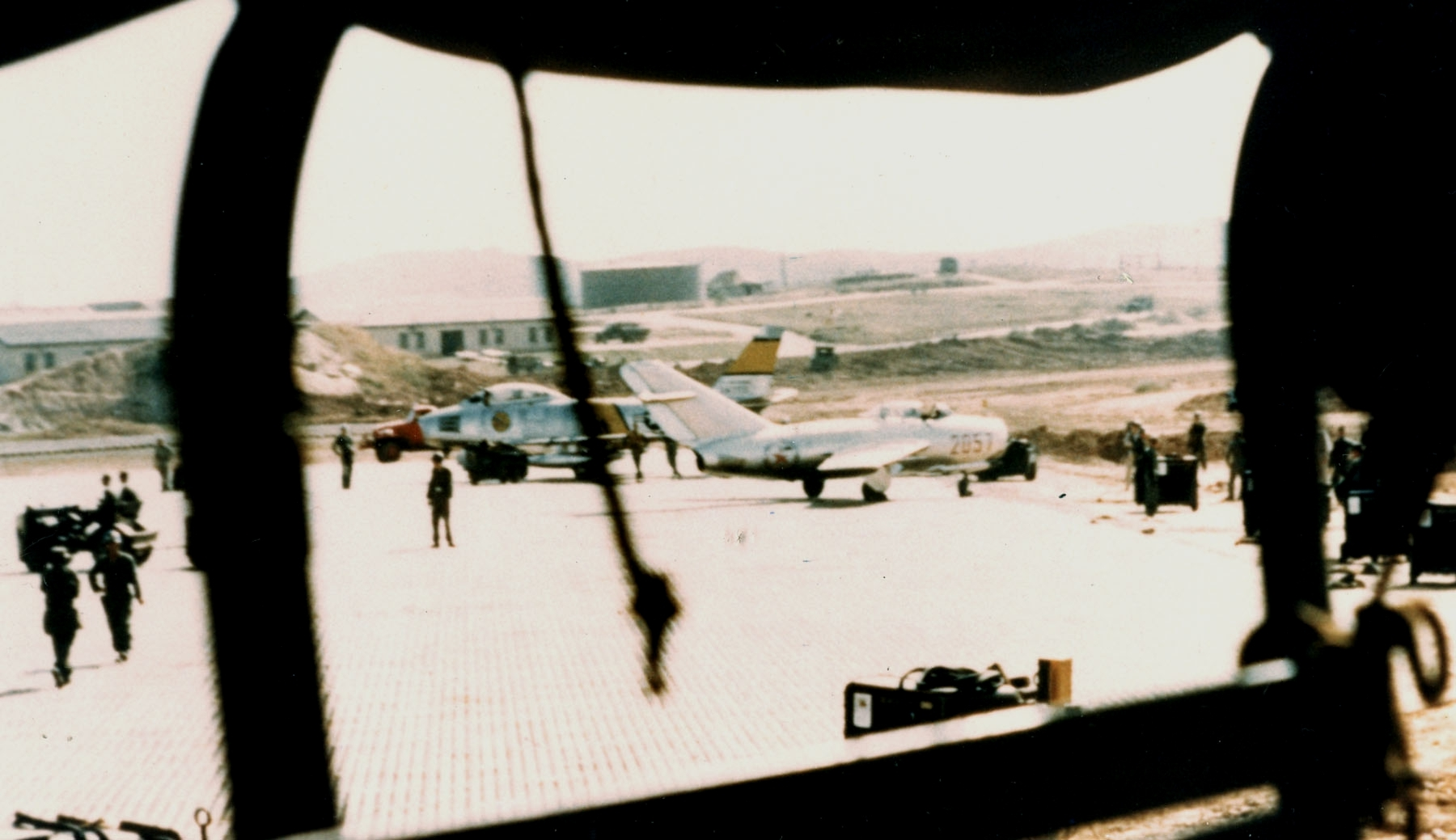
No's MiG-15 at Gimpo Airport on September 21, 1953, minutes after No's defection and arrival.

On the morning of September 21, 1953, No flew his Mikoyan-Gurevich MiG-15 from Sunan just outside Pyongyang to Kimpo Air Base in South Korea. The time from take-off in North Korea to landing in South Korea was 17 minutes, with the MiG reaching 1,000 km/h (620 mph). During the flight, he was not chased by North Korean aircraft (as he was too far away), nor was he interdicted by American air or ground forces; U.S. radar near Kimpo had been shut down temporarily that morning for routine maintenance. No landed the wrong way on the runway, almost hitting an F-86 Sabre jet landing at the same time from the opposite direction. Captain Dave William veered out of the way and exclaimed over the radio "It's a goddamn MiG!". Another American pilot, Captain Jim Sutton, who was circling the airport, said that if No had tried to land in the right direction, he would have been spotted and shot down. No taxied the MiG into a free parking spot between two Sabre jets, got out of the plane and began tearing up a picture of Kim Il Sung that was placed in the cockpits of North Korean aircraft, and then threw up his arms in surrender at approaching airbase security guards.

After being taken into custody and debriefed by CIA operative "Andy Brown" (born Arseny Yankovsky, son of Yuri Yankovsky), No received a $100,000 (equivalent to $1,203,358 in 2025) reward offered by Operation Moolah for being the first pilot to defect with an operational aircraft, which he said he never heard of prior to his defection. No explained that North Korean pilots were not allowed to listen to South Korean radio, the leaflets broadcasting the award were not dropped in Manchuria where the pilots were based, and even if they had heard about the reward, the pilots would not have understood the purchasing power of the US dollar; he said the program would have been more effective if they had offered a good job and residence in North America. President Dwight D. Eisenhower was against paying defectors.

=== No's MiG-15 ===
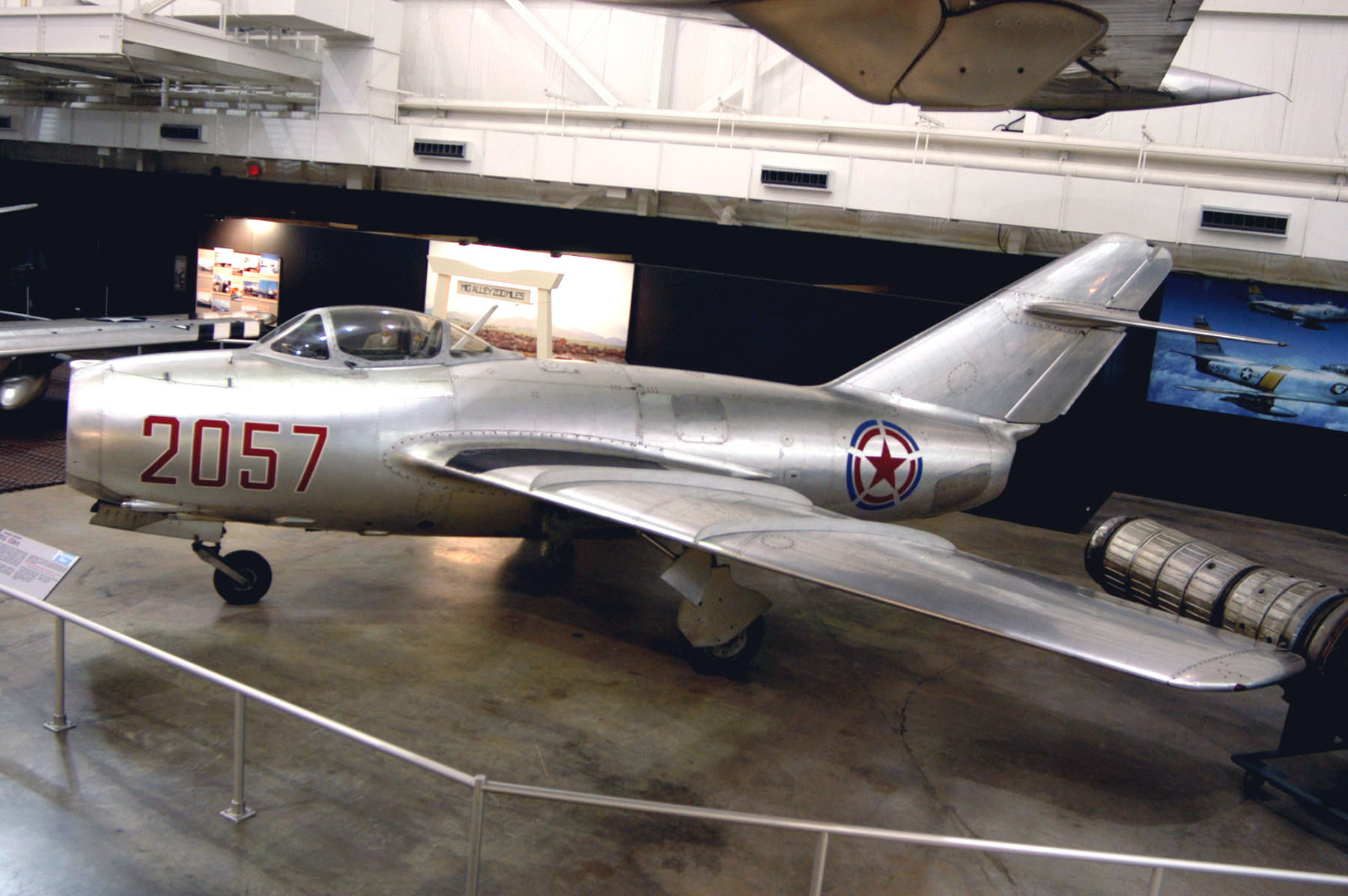
No's MiG-15 on display at the National Museum of the United States Air Force.

After No surrendered his aircraft, it was taken to Okinawa, where it was given USAF markings and test-flown by Captain H.E. Collins and Major Chuck Yeager. The MiG-15 was later shipped to Wright-Patterson Air Force Base after a U.S. offer to return it to its rightful owner was ignored. It is currently on display at the National Museum of the United States Air Force.

== Post-defection life ==
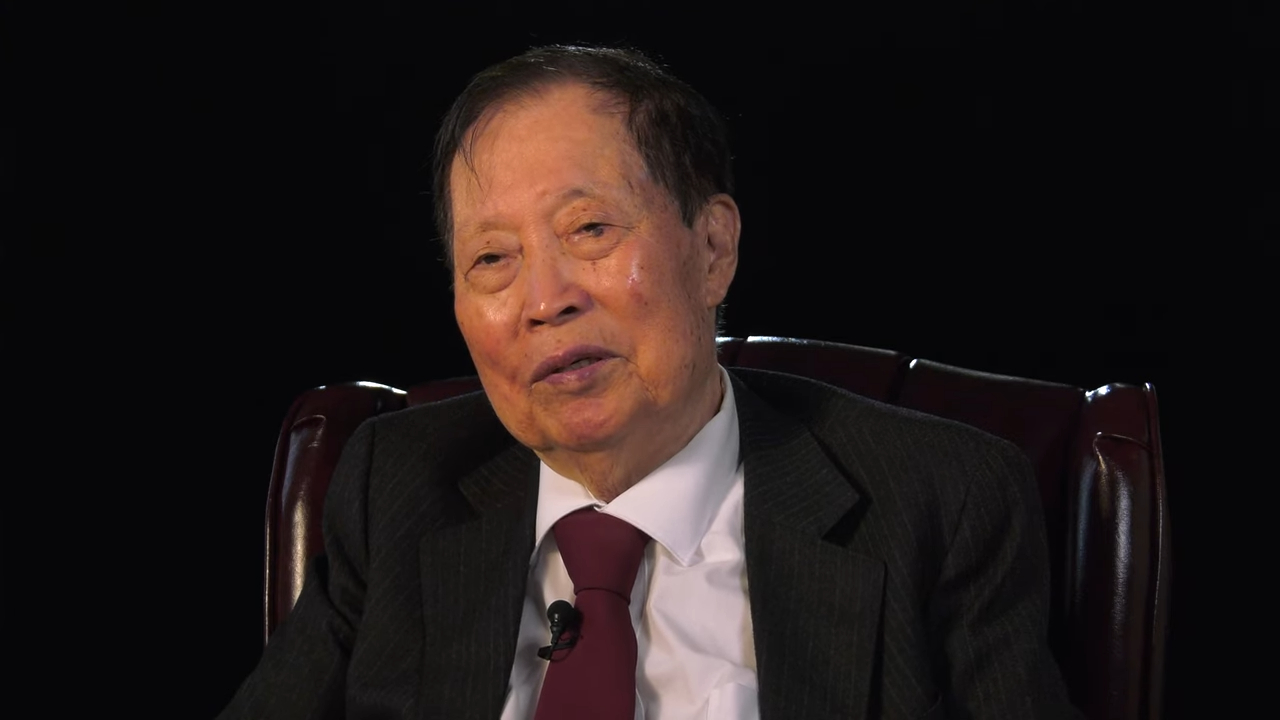
No interviewed by the National Museum of the United States Air Force in 2018

In 1954, No immigrated to the United States, where he met Vice President Richard Nixon. After immigrating, he anglicized his name to "Kenneth H. Rowe". In 1957, he was joined in the U.S. by his mother, who had defected to South Korea earlier in 1951. He subsequently graduated from the University of Delaware with degrees in mechanical and electrical engineering. He married an émigré from Kaesong, North Korea; they raised two sons and a daughter, and he became a U.S. citizen. He worked as an aeronautical engineer for Grumman, Boeing, Pan Am, General Dynamics, General Motors, General Electric, Lockheed, DuPont, and Westinghouse.

There were repercussions for No's defection, according to Captain Lee Un-yong, a flight instructor with the Korean People's Army Air and Anti-Air Force who defected to South Korea two years after No. In the 1970s, General Wan-yong, the top commander of the Korean People's Army Air and Anti-Air Force, was demoted, and five of No's comrades and commanders in the air force were executed. Among those killed was Lieutenant Kun Soo-sung, No's best friend and fellow pilot. No's parents would have also faced punishment for their son's defection; however, his father had already died in the Korean War, and his mother had defected to the South. The fate of No's uncle and the rest of his family remains unknown.

One of the pilots and a friend in his squadron, O Kuk-ryol, became a general and was considered by some the second most powerful man in North Korea.

In 1996, he wrote and published a book, A MiG-15 to Freedom, about his defection and previous life in North Korea. No retired in 2000 after working 17 years as an aeronautical engineering professor at Embry–Riddle Aeronautical University. A biography of No by Blaine Harden was published in 2015 as The Great Leader and the Fighter Pilot: The True Story of the Tyrant Who Created North Korea and The Young Lieutenant Who Stole His Way to Freedom. Harden had interviewed No and had access to newly released intelligence about him.

== Personal life ==
No spoke fluent English, Japanese, Korean and some Russian. He lived in Daytona Beach, Florida, where he died on December 26, 2022, at the age of 90. No stated that he never second-guessed his decision to defect from North Korea and make a new life in America.

At the time of his death, No was surrounded by his wife, daughter, younger son and one grandson.
