= Myra, West Virginia =

- Unincorporated community
- Location within West Virginia Location within the United States
- Coordinates: 38°13′17″N 82°06′45″W
- Country: United States
- State: West Virginia
- County: Lincoln
- Elevation: 663 ft (202 m)
- Time zone: UTC-5 (Eastern (EST))
  - Summer (DST): UTC-4 (EDT)
- ZIP code: 25544
- Area codes: 304 & 681
- GNIS feature ID: 1549843

Myra is an unincorporated community in Lincoln County, West Virginia, United States. Myra is located on the Mud River, 4 miles (6.4 km) south of Hamlin.

== History ==
A post office was operated at Myra from September 7, 1883, until it was closed on March 19, 2011. The community was founded at the same time the post office was established.

== Notable people ==
- Chuck Yeager, aviator (1923–2020), was born in Myra.
