= Chuck Yeager =

American flying ace and test pilot (1923–2020)

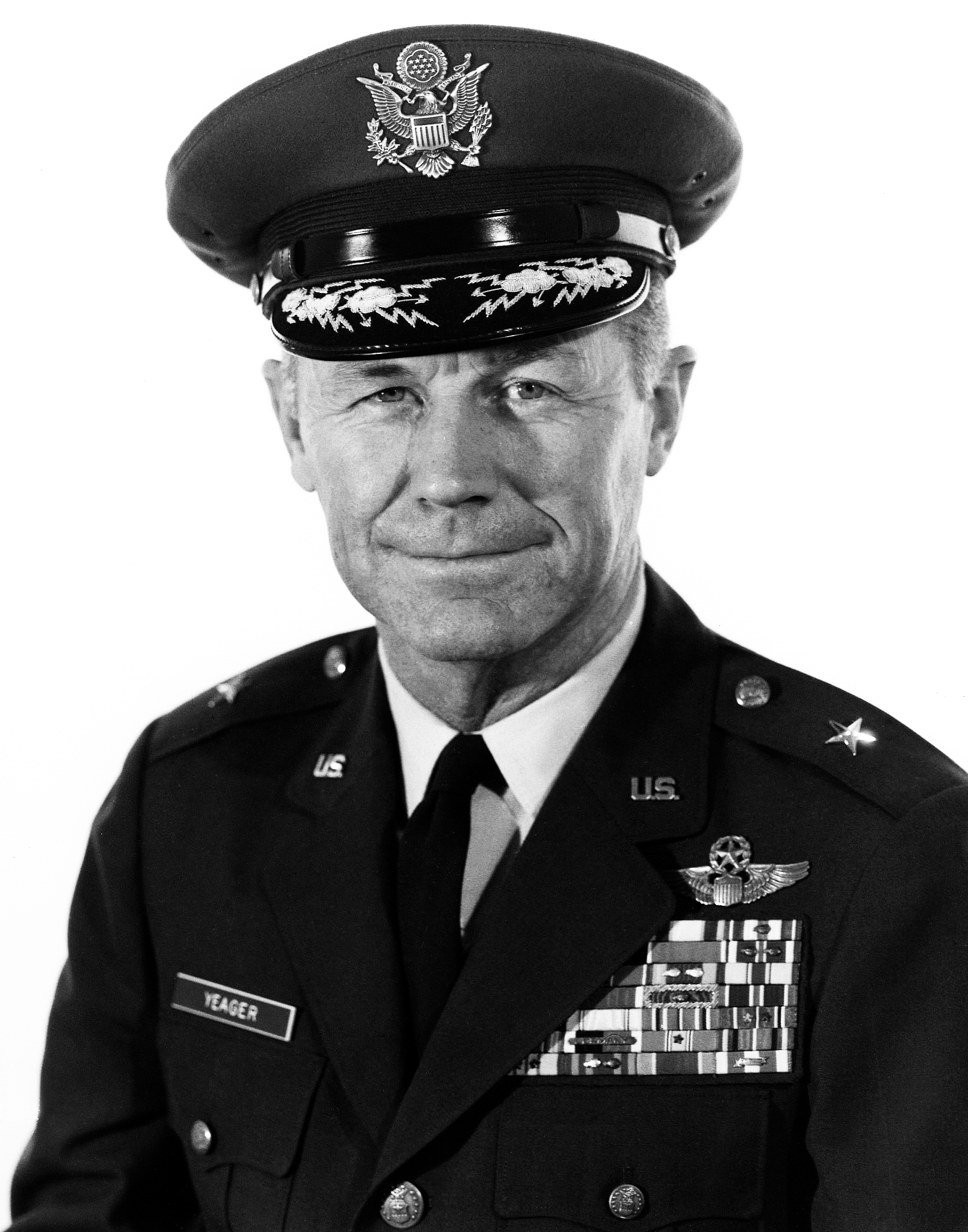
- Brigadier General Chuck Yeager
- Born: Charles Elwood Yeager; February 13, 1923; Myra, West Virginia, U.S.
- Died: December 7, 2020 (aged 97); Los Angeles, California, U.S.
- Spouses: Glennis Dickhouse (m. 1945; died 1990) Victoria Scott D'Angelo (m. 2003)
- Children: 4
- Relatives: Steve Yeager (cousin)
- Military career
- Allegiance: United States
- Branch: United States Army Air Forces; United States Air Force
- Service years: 1941–1947 (Army Air Forces); 1947–1975 (Air Force)
- Rank: Brigadier general
- Conflicts: World War II; Korean War; Vietnam War
- Awards: Air Force Distinguished Service Medal; Army Distinguished Service Medal; Silver Star (2); Legion of Merit (2); Distinguished Flying Cross (3); Bronze Star Medal; Purple Heart; (more...)
- Other work: Flight instructor; test pilot
- Website: Official website

Charles Elwood Yeager (/ˈjeɪɡər/ YAY-gər, February 13, 1923 – December 7, 2020) was a United States Air Force officer, flying ace, and record-setting test pilot who in October 1947 became the first pilot in history confirmed to have exceeded the speed of sound in level flight.

Yeager was raised in Hamlin, West Virginia. His career began in World War II as a private in the United States Army, assigned to the Army Air Forces in 1941. (Note: Yeager had not been in an airplane prior to January 1942, when his Engineering Officer invited him on a test flight after maintenance of an AT-11. He related that he became very sick on the flight: "After puking all over myself I said, 'Yeager, you made a big mistake'".) After serving as an aircraft mechanic, in September 1942, he entered enlisted pilot training and upon graduation was promoted to the rank of flight officer (the World War II Army Air Force version of the Army's warrant officer), later achieving most of his aerial victories as a P-51 Mustang fighter pilot on the Western Front, where he was credited with shooting down 11.5 enemy aircraft (6.5 Bf-109, 4 Fw-190 and 1 Me-262). The half credit is from a second pilot assisting him in a single shootdown. On October 12, 1944, he attained "ace in a day" status, shooting down five enemy aircraft in one mission.

After the war, Yeager became a test pilot and flew many types of aircraft, including experimental rocket-powered aircraft for the National Advisory Committee for Aeronautics (NACA). Through the NACA program, he became the first human to officially break the sound barrier on October 14, 1947, when he flew the experimental Bell X-1 at Mach 1.05 at an altitude of 45,000 ft (13,700 m), for which he won both the Collier and Mackay trophies in 1948. He broke several other speed and altitude records in the following years. In 1962, he became the first commandant of the USAF Aerospace Research Pilot School, which trained and produced astronauts for NASA and the Air Force.

Yeager later commanded fighter squadrons and wings in Germany, as well as in Southeast Asia during the Vietnam War. In recognition of his achievements and the outstanding performance ratings of those units, he was promoted to brigadier general in 1969 and inducted into the National Aviation Hall of Fame in 1973, retiring on March 1, 1975, for its colloquial similarity to "Mach 1". His three-war active-duty flying career spanned more than 30 years and took him to many parts of the world, including the Korean War zone and the Soviet Union during the height of the Cold War.

Yeager is referred to by many as one of the greatest pilots of all time, and was ranked fifth on Flying's list of the 51 Heroes of Aviation in 2013. He flew more than 360 different types of aircraft over a 70-year period, and continued to fly for two decades after retirement as a consultant pilot for the United States Air Force. In 2020 at the age of 97, Yeager died in a Los Angeles-area hospital.

== Early life ==
Chuck Yeager was born February 13, 1923, in Myra, West Virginia, to farming parents Albert Hal Yeager (1896–1963) and Susie Mae Yeager (née Sizemore; 1898–1987). The surname Yeager was an anglicised orthographic transcription of the German surname Jäger (hunter) or Jaeger, based on his German-Dutch ancestors. Yeager had two brothers, Roy and Hal Jr., and two sisters, Doris Ann, who was accidentally killed at age two by four-year-old Roy when he was playing with a firearm, and Pansy Lee. His cousin, Steve Yeager, was a professional baseball catcher. (Note: Chuck Yeager is not related to Jeana Yeager, one of the two pilots of the Rutan Voyager aircraft, which circled the world without landing or refueling.)

When he was five years old, his family moved to the nearby village of Hamlin, West Virginia, where he grew up. He attended Hamlin High School, where he played basketball and football, receiving his best grades in geometry and typing. He graduated from high school in June 1941.

His first experience with the military was as a teen at the Citizens Military Training Camp at Fort Benjamin Harrison, Indianapolis, Indiana, during the summers of 1939 and 1940.

== Career ==
=== World War II ===
On September 12, 1941, Yeager enlisted as a private in the U.S. Army Air Forces (USAAF), and became an aircraft mechanic at George Air Force Base, Victorville, California. At enlistment, Yeager was not eligible for flight training because of his age and educational background, but the entry of the U.S. into World War II less than three months later prompted the USAAF to alter its recruiting standards. Yeager had unusually sharp vision, a visual acuity rated 20/10, which once enabled him to shoot a deer at 600 yd (550 m).

At the time of his flight training acceptance, he was a crew chief on an AT-11. He received his pilot wings and a promotion to flight officer at Luke Field, Arizona, where he graduated from Class 43C on March 10, 1943. Assigned to the 357th Fighter Group at Tonopah, Nevada, he initially trained as a fighter pilot, flying Bell P-39 Airacobras (being grounded for seven days for clipping a farmer's tree during a training flight), and shipped overseas with the group on November 23, 1943.

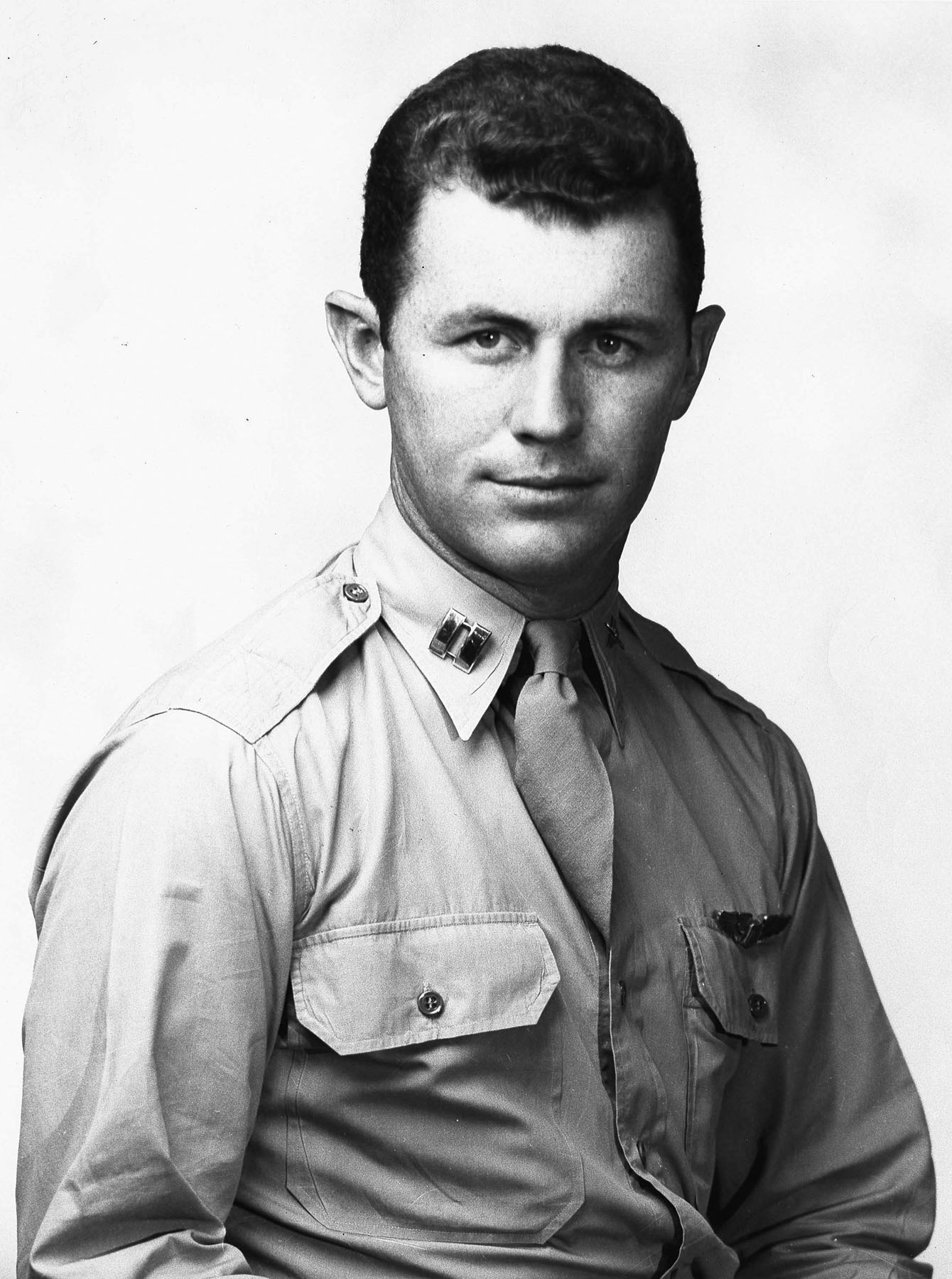
Yeager in c. 1944 was a young captain in the United States Army Air Forces.

Stationed in the United Kingdom at RAF Leiston, Yeager flew P-51 Mustangs in combat with the 363d Fighter Squadron. He named his aircraft Glamorous Glen after his girlfriend, Glennis Faye Dickhouse, who became his wife in February 1945. Yeager had gained one victory before he was shot down over France in his first aircraft (P-51B-5-NA s/n 43-6763) on March 5, 1944, on his eighth mission. He escaped to Spain on March 30, 1944, with the help of the Maquis (French Resistance) and returned to England on May 15, 1944. During his stay with the Maquis, Yeager assisted the guerrillas in duties that did not involve direct combat; he helped construct bombs for the group, a skill that he had learned from his father. He was awarded the Bronze Star for helping a navigator, Omar M. "Pat" Patterson Jr., to cross the Pyrenees.

Despite a regulation prohibiting "evaders" (escaped pilots) from flying over enemy territory again, the purpose of which was to prevent resistance groups from being compromised by giving the enemy a second chance to possibly capture him, Yeager was reinstated to flying combat. He had joined another evader, fellow P-51 pilot 1st Lt Fred Glover, in speaking directly to the Supreme Allied Commander, General Dwight D. Eisenhower, on June 12, 1944. "I raised so much hell that General Eisenhower finally let me go back to my squadron" Yeager said. "He cleared me for combat after D Day, because all the free Frenchmen – Maquis and people like that – had surfaced". Eisenhower, after gaining permission from the War Department to decide the requests, concurred with Yeager and Glover. In the meantime, Yeager shot down his second enemy aircraft, a German Junkers Ju 88 bomber, over the English Channel.

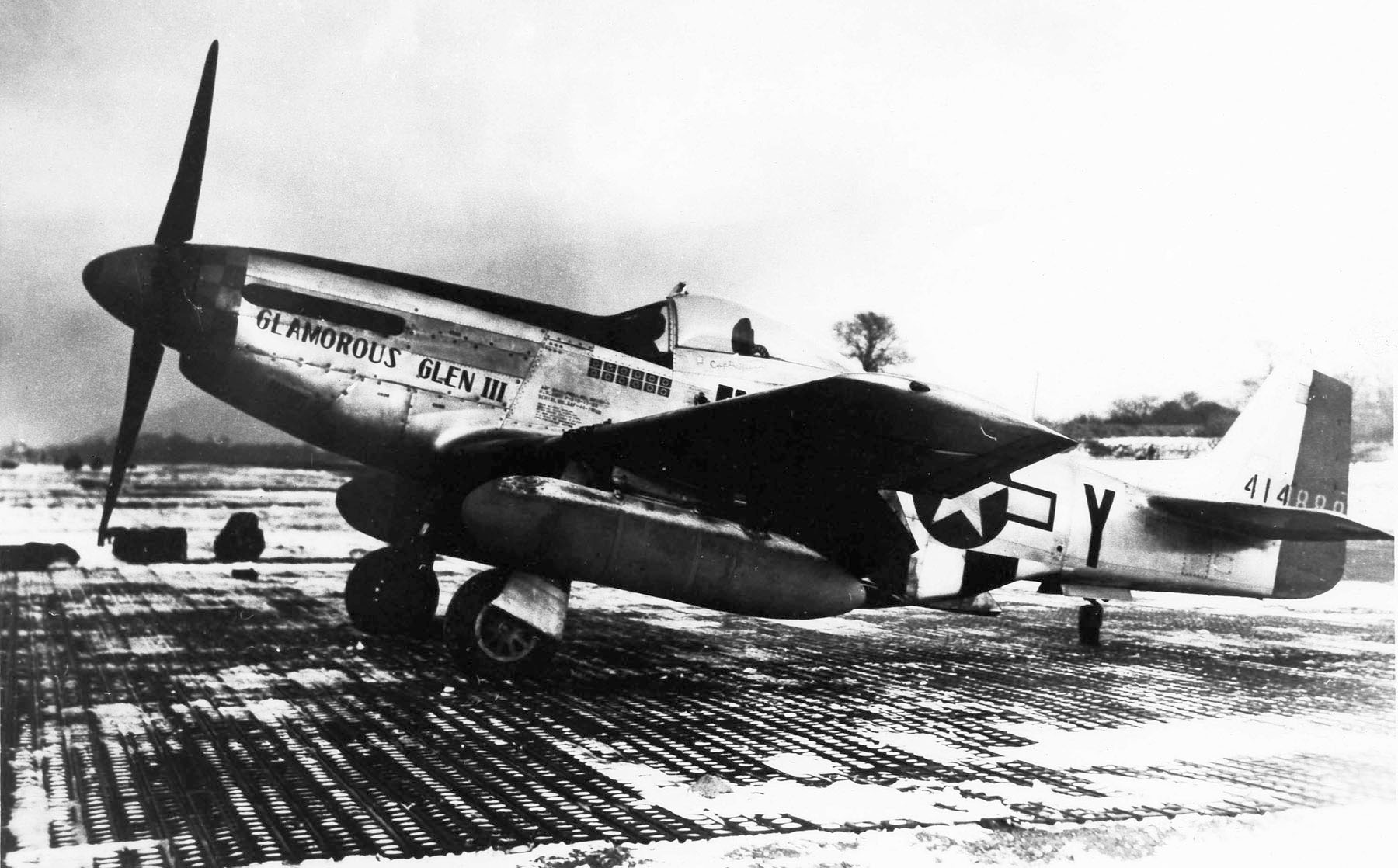
P-51D-20NA, Glamorous Glen III, is the aircraft in which Yeager achieved most of his aerial victories.

Yeager demonstrated outstanding flying skills and combat leadership. On October 12, 1944, he became the first pilot in his group to make "ace in a day," downing five enemy aircraft in a single mission. Two of these victories were scored without firing a single shot: when he flew into firing position against a Messerschmitt Bf 109, the pilot of the aircraft panicked, breaking to port and colliding with his wingman. Yeager said both pilots bailed out. He finished the war with 11.5 official victories, including one of the first air-to-air victories over a jet fighter, a German Messerschmitt Me 262 that he shot down as it was on final approach for landing.

Yeager's official statement of the 12 October mission states:

"I was leading the Group with Cement Squadron and was roving out to the right of the first box of bombers. I was over STEINHUDER LAKE when 22 Me. 109s crossed in front of my Squadron from 11:00 O’Clock to 1:00 O’Clock. I was coming out of the sun and they were about 1 ½ miles away at the same level of 28,000 feet. I fell in behind the enemy formation and followed them for about 3 minutes, climbing to 30,000 feet. I still had my wing tanks and had closed up to around 1,000 yards, coming within firing range and positioning the Squadron behind the entire enemy formation. Two of the Me. 109s were lagging over to the right. One slowed up and, before I could start firing, rolled over and bailed out. The other Me. 109, flying his wing, bailed out immediately after as I was ready to line him in my sights. I was the closest to the tail-end of the enemy formation and no one, but myself, was in shooting range and no one was firing. I dropped my tanks and then closed up to the last Jerry and opened fire from 600 yards, using the K-14 sight. I observed strikes all over the ship, particularly heavy in the cockpit. He skidded off to the left and was smoking and streaming coolant and went into a slow diving turn to the left. I was closing up on another Me. 109 so I did not follow him down. Lt. STERN, flying in Blue Flight, reports this E/A on fire as it passed him and went into a spin. I closed up on the next Me. 109 to 100 yards, skidded to the right and took a deflection shot of about 10o. I gave about a 3 second burst and the whole fuselage splitopen and blew up after we passed. Another Me. 109 to the right had cut his throttle and was trying to get behind. I broke to the right and quickly rolled to the left on his tail. He started pulling it in and I was pulling 6”G”. I got a lead from around 300 yards and gave him a short burst. There were hits on wings and tail section. He snapped to the right 3 times and bailed out when he quit snapping at around 18,000 feet.

I did not blackout during this engagement due to the efficiency of the “G” Suit. Even though I was skidding I hit the second Me. 109s by keeping the bead and range on the E/A. To my estimation the K-14 Sight is the biggest improvement to combat equipment for Fighters up to this date.

The Me. 109s appeared to have a type of bubble canopy and had purple noses and were a mousey brown all over.

I claim Five Me. 109s destroyed."

In his 1986 memoirs, Yeager recalled with disgust that "atrocities were committed by both sides", and said he went on a mission with orders from the Eighth Air Force to "strafe anything that moved". During the mission briefing, he whispered to Major Donald H. Bochkay, "If we are going to do things like this, we sure as hell better make sure we are on the winning side". Yeager said, "I'm certainly not proud of that particular strafing mission against civilians. But it is there, on the record and in my memory". He also expressed bitterness at his treatment in England during World War II, describing the British as "arrogant" and "nasty" on Twitter.

Yeager was commissioned a second lieutenant while at Leiston, and was promoted to captain before the end of his tour. He flew his 61st and final mission on January 15, 1945, and returned to the United States in early February 1945. As an evader, he received his choice of assignments and, because his new wife was pregnant, chose Wright Field to be near his home in West Virginia. His high number of flight hours and maintenance experience qualified him to become a functional test pilot of repaired aircraft, which brought him under the command of Colonel Albert Boyd, head of the Aeronautical Systems Flight Test Division.

=== Post-World War II ===
==== Test pilot – breaking the sound barrier ====
After the war, Yeager remained in the U.S. Army Air Forces. Upon graduating from Air Materiel Command Flight Performance School (Class 46C), Yeager became a test pilot at Muroc Army Air Field (now Edwards Air Force Base). After Bell Aircraft test pilot Chalmers "Slick" Goodlin demanded US$150,000 (equivalent to $2,160,000 in 2025) to break the sound barrier, the USAAF selected the 24-year-old Yeager to fly the rocket-powered Bell XS-1 in a NACA program to research high-speed flight. Under the National Security Act of 1947, the USAAF became the United States Air Force (USAF) on September 18.

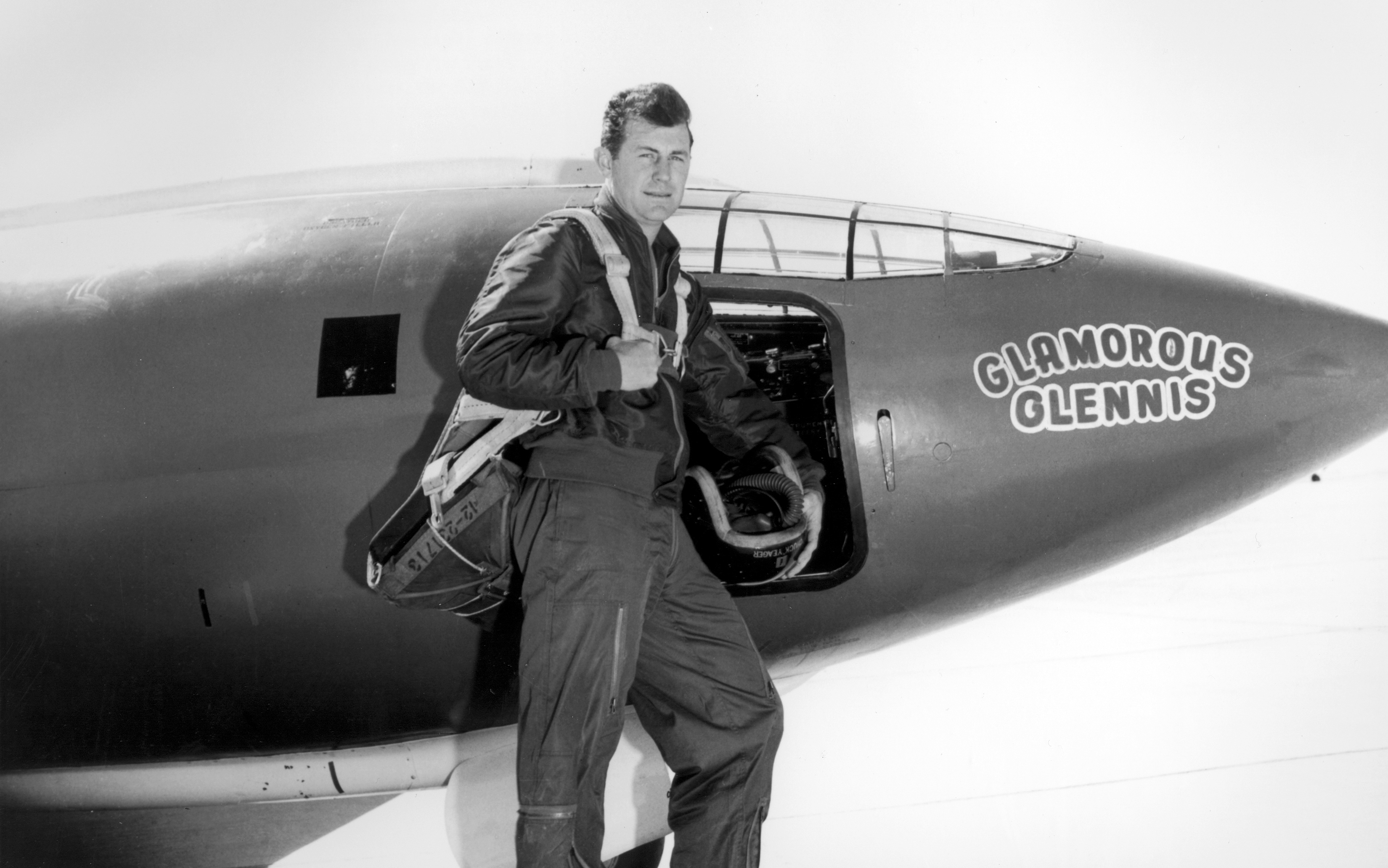
Yeager stands in front of the Bell X-1 named Glamorous Glennis. He named all of his assigned aircraft in some variation after his wife.

Yeager's flight was scheduled for October 14. Two nights before his flight, Yeager went horseback riding with his wife and fell, breaking two ribs under his right arm. Worried the injury would remove him from the mission, Yeager had a civilian doctor in nearby Rosamond tape his ribs. (Note: In some versions of the story, the doctor was a veterinarian; however, local residents have noted that Rosamond was so small that it had neither a medical doctor nor a veterinarian.)

To seal the hatch of the XS-1, the pilot needed to hold the hatch in position and use their right arm to slam down a heavy lever. Yeager would not be able to seal the hatch with his broken ribs, so Yeager secretly asked his friend and fellow project pilot Jack Ridley for a solution. Ridley sawed off the end of a broom handle for Yeager to use as a lever to seal the hatch.

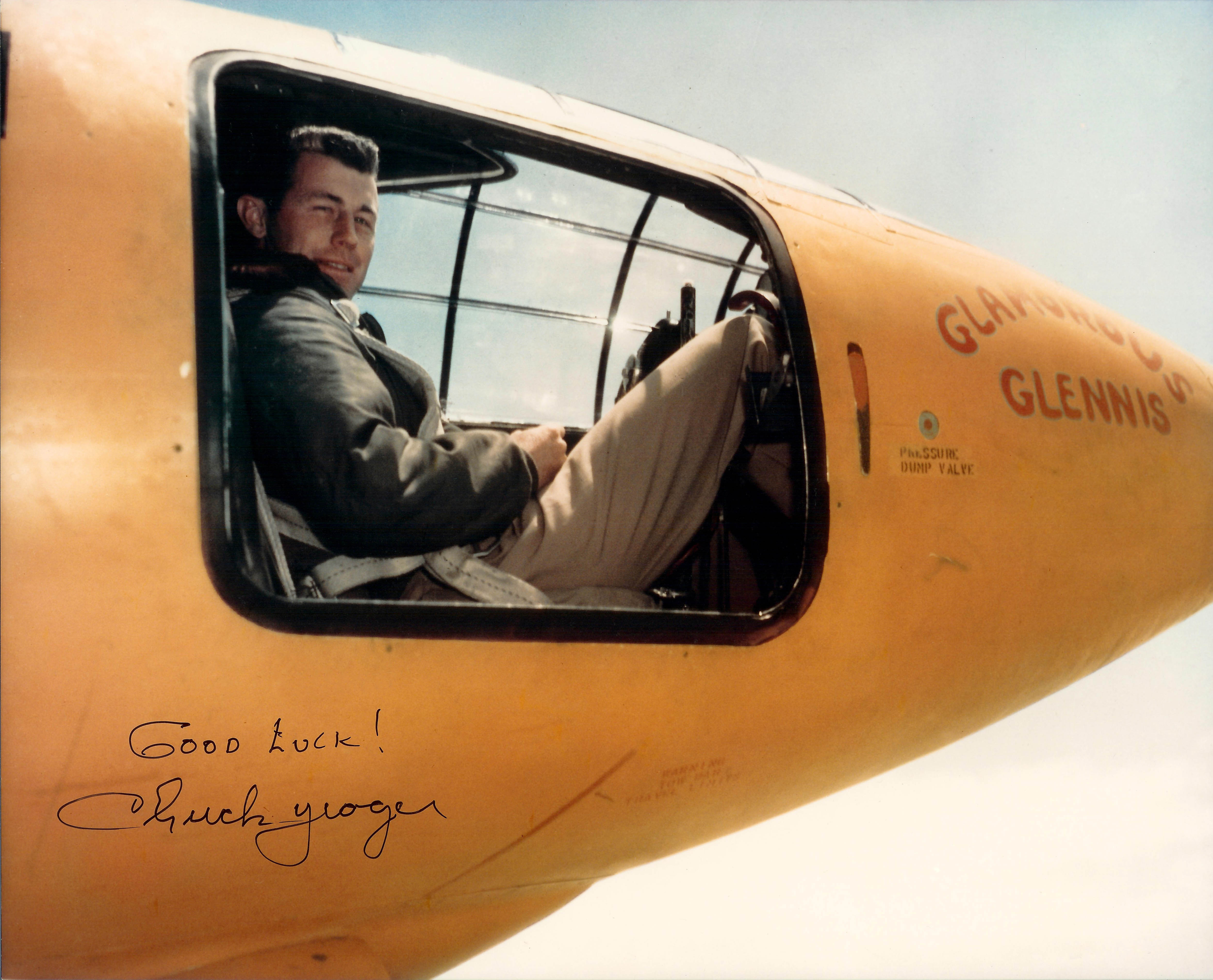
Yeager is in the Bell X-1 cockpit.

Yeager broke the sound barrier on October 14, 1947, in level flight while piloting the X-1 Glamorous Glennis at Mach 1.05 at an altitude of 45,000 ft (13,700 m) (Note: Yeager was the first confirmed to break the sound barrier, and the first by any measure to do it in level flight. Other pilots who have been suggested as unproven possibilities to have exceeded the sound barrier before Yeager were all flying in a steep dive for the supposed occurrence. There is anecdotal evidence that American pilot George Welch may have broken the sound barrier two weeks before Yeager, while diving an XP-86 Sabre on October 1, 1947, and again on October 14, just 30 minutes before Yeager's X-1 flight. However, the precision instruments used to carefully document the speed of Yeager's flight were not used during Welch's flights. Even earlier, German pilot Lothar Sieber was estimated to have broken the speed of sound during his fatal test-flight of the rocket-powered Bachem Natter on March 1, 1945, although the speed was not officially measured. In his 1990 book Me-163, former Messerschmitt Me 163 Komet pilot Mano Ziegler claims that his friend, test pilot Heini Dittmar, broke the sound barrier and that on July 6, 1944, he reached 1,130 km/h in dive, and that several people on the ground heard the sonic booms. There was also a disputed claim by German pilot Hans Guido Mutke that he was the first person to break the sound barrier, on April 9, 1945, in a Messerschmitt Me 262.) over the Rogers Dry Lake of the Mojave Desert in California. The success of the mission was not announced to the public for nearly eight months, until June 10, 1948. Yeager was awarded the Mackay Trophy and the Collier Trophy in 1948 for his mach-transcending flight, and the Harmon International Trophy in 1954. The X-1 he flew that day was later put on permanent display at the Smithsonian Institution's National Air and Space Museum. During 1952, he attended the Air Command and Staff College.

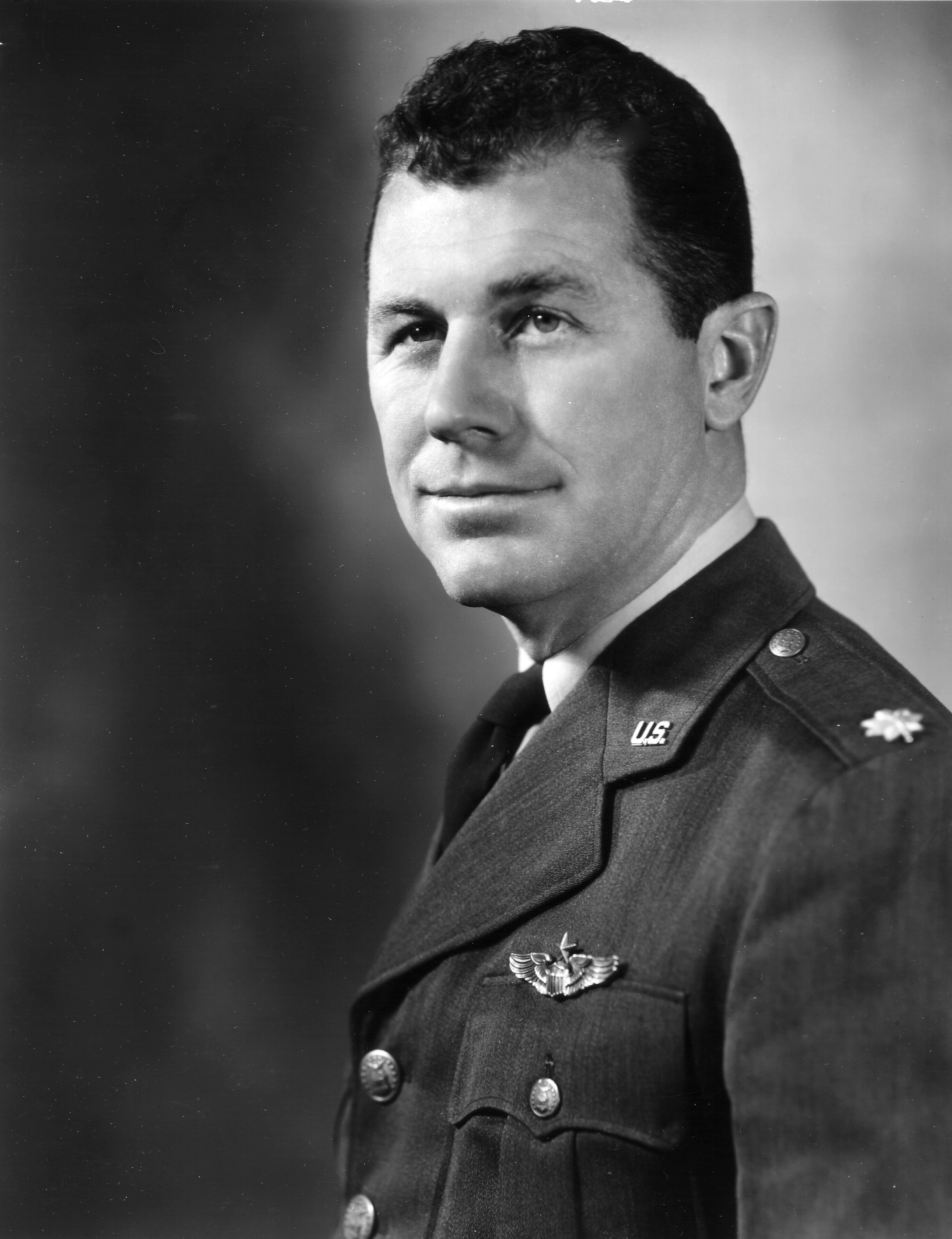
Yeager in 1950.

Yeager continued to break many speed and altitude records. He was one of the first American pilots to fly a Mikoyan-Gurevich MiG-15, after its pilot, No Kum-sok, defected to South Korea. Returning to Muroc, during the latter half of 1953, Yeager was involved with the USAF team that was working on the X-1A, an aircraft designed to surpass Mach 2 in level flight. That year, he flew a chase aircraft for the civilian pilot Jackie Cochran as she became the first woman to fly faster than sound.

On November 20, 1953, the U.S. Navy program involving the Douglas D-558-II Skyrocket and its pilot, Scott Crossfield, became the first team to reach twice the speed of sound. After they were bested, Ridley and Yeager decided to beat rival Crossfield's speed record in a series of test flights that they dubbed "Operation NACA Weep". They not only beat Crossfield by setting a new record at Mach 2.44 on December 12, 1953, but also did so in time to spoil a celebration planned for the 50th anniversary of flight, at which Crossfield was to be called "the fastest man alive".

The new record flight, however, did not entirely go to plan, since shortly after reaching Mach 2.44, Yeager lost control of the X-1A at about 80,000 ft (24,000 m) due to inertia coupling, a phenomenon largely unknown at the time. With the aircraft simultaneously rolling, pitching, and yawing out of control, Yeager dropped 51,000 ft (16,000 m) in less than a minute before regaining control at around 29,000 ft (8,800 m). He then managed to land without further incident. For this feat, Yeager was awarded the Distinguished Service Medal (DSM) in 1954. (Note: Yeager received the DSM in the Army design, since the Air Force Distinguished Service Medal was not awarded until 1965.)

==== Military command ====
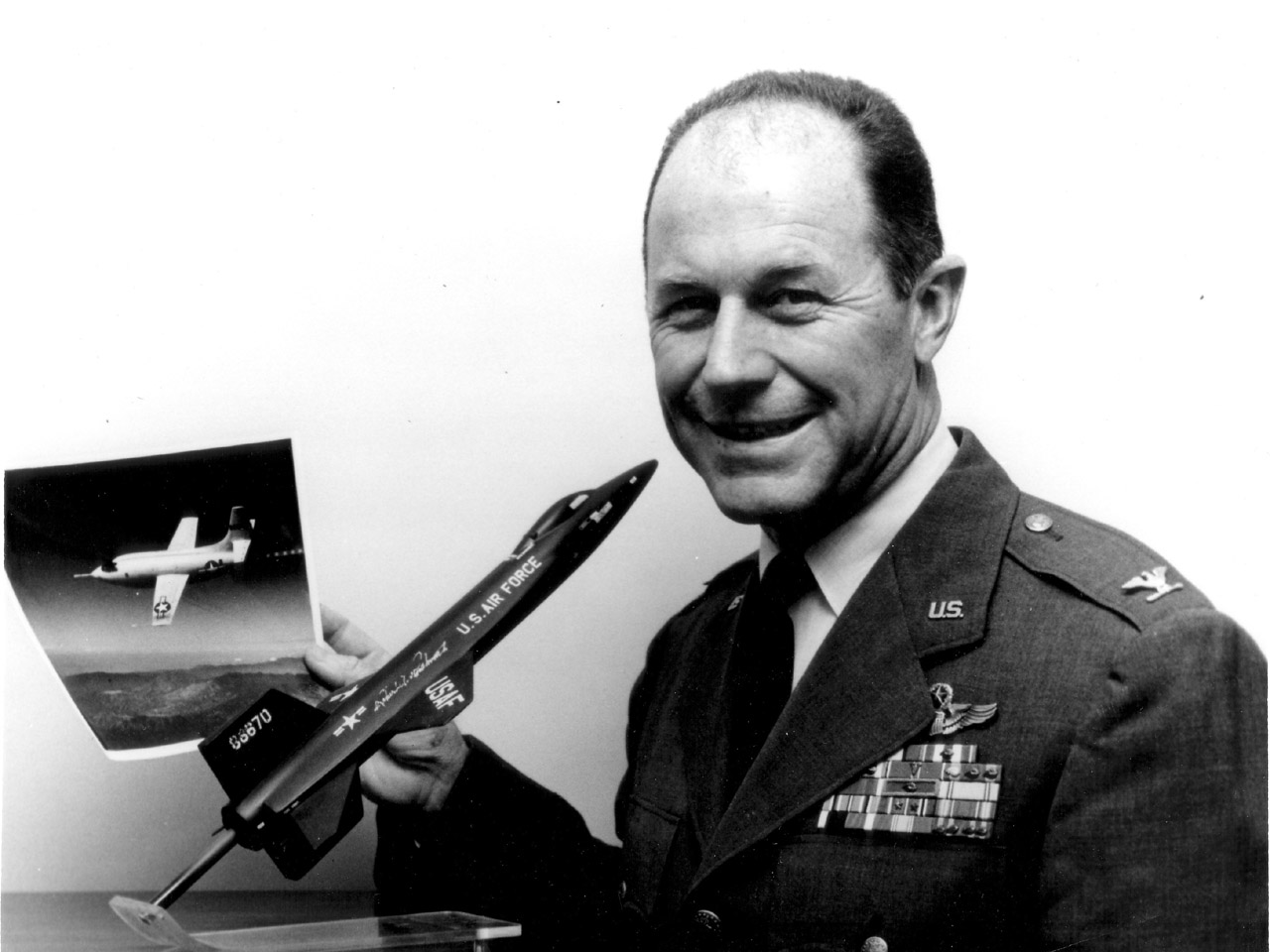
Yeager was Commandant of the USAF Aerospace Research Pilot School, with a model of the North American X-15, 1959.

Yeager was foremost a fighter pilot and held several squadron and wing commands. From 1954 to 1957, he commanded the F-86H Sabre-equipped 417th Fighter-Bomber Squadron (50th Fighter-Bomber Wing) at Hahn AB, West Germany, and Toul-Rosieres Air Base, France; and from 1957 to 1960 the F-100D Super Sabre-equipped 1st Fighter Day Squadron at George Air Force Base, California, and Morón Air Base, Spain.

He was a full colonel in 1962, after completion of a year's studies and final thesis on STOL aircraft at the Air War College. He became the first commandant of the USAF Aerospace Research Pilot School, which produced astronauts for NASA and the USAF, after its redesignation from the USAF Flight Test Pilot School. He had only a high school education, so he was not eligible to become an astronaut like those he trained. In April 1962, Yeager made his only flight with Neil Armstrong. Their job, flying a T-33, was to evaluate Smith Ranch Dry Lake in Nevada for use as an emergency landing site for the North American X-15.

In his autobiography, he wrote that he knew the lake bed was unsuitable for landings after recent rains, but Armstrong insisted on flying out anyway. As Armstrong suggested that they do a touch-and-go, Yeager advised against it, telling him "You may touch, but you ain't gonna go!" When Armstrong did touch down, the wheels became stuck in the mud, bringing the plane to a sudden stop and provoking Yeager to fits of laughter. They had to wait for rescue.

Yeager's participation in the test pilot training program for NASA included controversial behavior. Yeager reportedly did not believe that Ed Dwight, the first African American pilot admitted into the program, should be a part of it. In the 2019 documentary series Chasing the Moon, the filmmakers made the claim that Yeager instructed staff and participants at the school that "Washington is trying to cram the nigger down our throats. [President] Kennedy is using this to make 'racial equality,' so do not speak to him, do not socialize with him, do not drink with him, do not invite him over to your house, and in six months he'll be gone." In his autobiography, Dwight details how Yeager's leadership led to discriminatory treatment throughout his training at Edwards Air Force Base. Yeager, in his autobiography, states that Dwight had difficulty with the academics despite a tutoring system brought in especially for him, and that the controversy died down after an investigative commission examined the records.

Between December 1963 and January 1964, Yeager completed five flights in the NASA M2-F1 lifting body. An accident during a December 1963 test flight in one of the school's NF-104s resulted in serious injuries. After climbing to a near-record altitude, the plane's controls became ineffective, and it entered a flat spin. After several turns, and an altitude loss of approximately 95,000 feet, Yeager ejected from the plane. During the ejection, the seat straps released normally, but the seat base slammed into Yeager, with the still-hot rocket motor breaking his helmet's plastic faceplate and causing his emergency oxygen supply to catch fire. The resulting burns to his face required extensive and agonizing medical care. This was Yeager's last attempt at setting test-flying records due to his apparent inability to fly the required flight profiles for optimum climb performance. (Note: The movie The Right Stuff implies that Yeager took the NF-104 on a spur-of-the-moment, unauthorized flight. In reality, it was a part of a scheduled series of test flights.)

In 1966, Yeager took command of the 405th Tactical Fighter Wing at Clark Air Base, the Philippines, whose squadrons were deployed on rotational temporary duty (TDY) in South Vietnam and elsewhere in Southeast Asia. There he flew 127 missions. In February 1968, Yeager was assigned command of the 4th Tactical Fighter Wing at Seymour Johnson Air Force Base, North Carolina, and led the McDonnell Douglas F-4 Phantom II wing in South Korea during the Pueblo crisis.

Yeager was promoted to brigadier general and was assigned in July 1969 as the vice-commander of the Seventeenth Air Force.

===== Deputation to Pakistan =====
From 1971 to 1973, at the behest of Ambassador Joseph Farland, Yeager was assigned as the Air Attache in Pakistan to advise the Pakistan Air Force which was led by Abdur Rahim Khan (the first Pakistani to break the sound barrier). He arrived in Pakistan at a time when tensions with India were at a high level. One of Yeager's jobs during this time was to assist Pakistani technicians in installing AIM-9 Sidewinders on PAF's Shenyang F-6 fighters. He also had a keen interest in interacting with PAF personnel from various Pakistani Squadrons and helping them develop combat tactics.

In one instance in 1972, while visiting the No. 15 Squadron "Cobras" at Peshawar Airbase, the Squadron's OC Wing Commander Najeeb Khan escorted him to K2 in a pair of F-86Fs after Yeager requested a visit to the second highest mountain on Earth. After hostilities broke out in 1971, he decided to stay in West Pakistan and continued overseeing the PAF's operations. Yeager recalled "the Pakistanis whipped the Indians' asses in the sky... the Pakistanis scored a three-to-one kill ratio, knocking out 102 Russian-made Indian jets and losing 34 airplanes of their own".

During the war, he flew around the western front in a helicopter documenting wreckages of Indian aircraft of Soviet origin, which included Sukhoi Su-7s and MiG-21s. These aircraft were transported to the United States after the war for analysis. Yeager also flew around in his Beechcraft Queen Air, a small passenger aircraft that was assigned to him by the Pentagon, picking up shot-down Indian fighter pilots. The Beechcraft was later destroyed during an air raid by the IAF at Chaklala airbase.

Edward C. Ingraham, a U.S. diplomat who had served as political counselor to Ambassador Farland in Islamabad, recalled this incident in the Washington Monthly of October 1985: "After Yeager's Beechcraft was destroyed during an Indian air raid, he raged to his cowering colleagues that the Indian pilot had been specifically instructed by Indira Gandhi to blast his plane. 'It was', he later wrote, 'the Indian way of giving Uncle Sam the finger'". Yeager was incensed over the incident and demanded U.S. retaliation. It was later revealed that it was then Indian Navy pilot Lieutenant (later Admiral) Arun Prakash who bombed Chuck Yeager's personal Beechcraft Queen Air at Pakistan's Chaklala Airbase using a Hawker Hunter fighter aircraft with Admiral Prakash later writing and confirming it as a bold move against American involvement.

=== Post-retirement and in popular culture ===
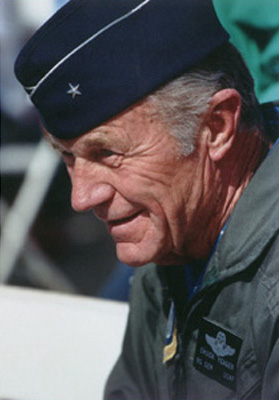
Brigadier General Yeager in 2000

On March 1, 1975, Yeager retired from the Air Force at Norton Air Force Base, California.

Yeager made a cameo appearance in the TV show I Dream of Jeannie, and in the movie The Right Stuff (1983). He played "Fred", a bartender at "Pancho's Place", which was most appropriate, because he said, "if all the hours were ever totaled, I reckon I spent more time at her place than in a cockpit over those years". Sam Shepard portrayed Yeager in the film, which chronicles in part his famous 1947 record-breaking flight.

Yeager has been referenced several times in the shared Star Trek universe, including having a namesake fictional type of starship, a dangerous starship formation-maneuver named after him called the "Yeager Loop" (most notably mentioned in the Star Trek: The Next Generation episode "The First Duty"), and appearing in archival footage within the opening title sequence for the series Star Trek: Enterprise (2001–2005). For Enterprise, executive producer Rick Berman said that he envisaged the lead character, Captain Jonathan Archer, as being "halfway between Chuck Yeager and Han Solo".

For several years in the 1980s, Yeager was connected to General Motors, publicizing ACDelco, the company's automotive parts division. In 1986, he was invited to drive the Chevrolet Corvette pace car for the 70th running of the Indianapolis 500. In 1988, Yeager was again invited to drive the pace car, this time at the wheel of an Oldsmobile Cutlass Supreme. In 1986, President Reagan appointed Yeager to the Rogers Commission that investigated the explosion of the Space Shuttle Challenger.

During this time, Yeager also served as a technical adviser for three Electronic Arts flight simulator video games. The games include Chuck Yeager's Advanced Flight Trainer, Chuck Yeager's Advanced Flight Trainer 2.0, and Chuck Yeager's Air Combat. The game manuals feature quotes and anecdotes from Yeager and were well received by players. Missions feature several of Yeager's accomplishments and let players challenge his records. Chuck Yeager's Advanced Flight Trainer was Electronic Art's top-selling game for 1987.

In 2009, Yeager participated in the documentary The Legend of Pancho Barnes and the Happy Bottom Riding Club, a profile of his friend Pancho Barnes. The documentary was screened at film festivals, aired on public television in the United States, and won an Emmy Award.

On October 14, 1997, on the 50th anniversary of his historic flight past Mach 1, he flew a new Glamorous Glennis III, an F-15D Eagle, past Mach 1. The chase plane for the flight was an F-16 Fighting Falcon piloted by Bob Hoover, a longtime test, fighter, and aerobatic pilot who had been Yeager's wingman for the first supersonic flight. At the end of his speech to the crowd in 1997, Yeager concluded, "All that I am ... I owe to the Air Force". Later that month, he was the recipient of the Tony Jannus Award for his achievements.

On October 14, 2012, on the 65th anniversary of breaking the sound barrier, Yeager did it again at the age of 89, flying as co-pilot in a McDonnell Douglas F-15 Eagle piloted by Captain David Vincent out of Nellis Air Force Base.

== Awards and decorations ==
In 1973, Yeager was inducted into the National Aviation Hall of Fame, arguably aviation's highest honor. In 1974, Yeager received the Golden Plate Award of the American Academy of Achievement. In December 1975, the U.S. Congress awarded Yeager a silver medal "equivalent to a noncombat Medal of Honor ... for contributing immeasurably to aerospace science by risking his life in piloting the X-1 research airplane faster than the speed of sound on October 14, 1947". President Gerald Ford presented the medal to Yeager in a ceremony at the White House on December 8, 1976. (Note: This is apparently a unique award, as the law that created it states it is equivalent to a noncombat Medal of Honor. It is referred to as a Special Congressional Silver Medal in the President's Daily Diary, which also has a list of ceremony attendees.)

Yeager never attended college and was often modest about his background, but is considered by many, including Flying Magazine, the California Hall of Fame, the State of West Virginia, National Aviation Hall of Fame, a few U.S. presidents, and the United States Army Air Force, to be one of the greatest pilots of all time. Air & Space/Smithsonian magazine ranked him the fifth greatest pilot of all time in 2003. Regardless of his lack of higher education, West Virginia's Marshall University named its highest academic scholarship the Society of Yeager Scholars in his honor. He was the chairman of Experimental Aircraft Association (EAA)'s Young Eagle Program from 1994 to 2004, and was named the program's chairman emeritus.

In 1966, Yeager was inducted into the International Air & Space Hall of Fame. He was inducted into the International Space Hall of Fame in 1981. He was inducted into the Aerospace Walk of Honor 1990 inaugural class.

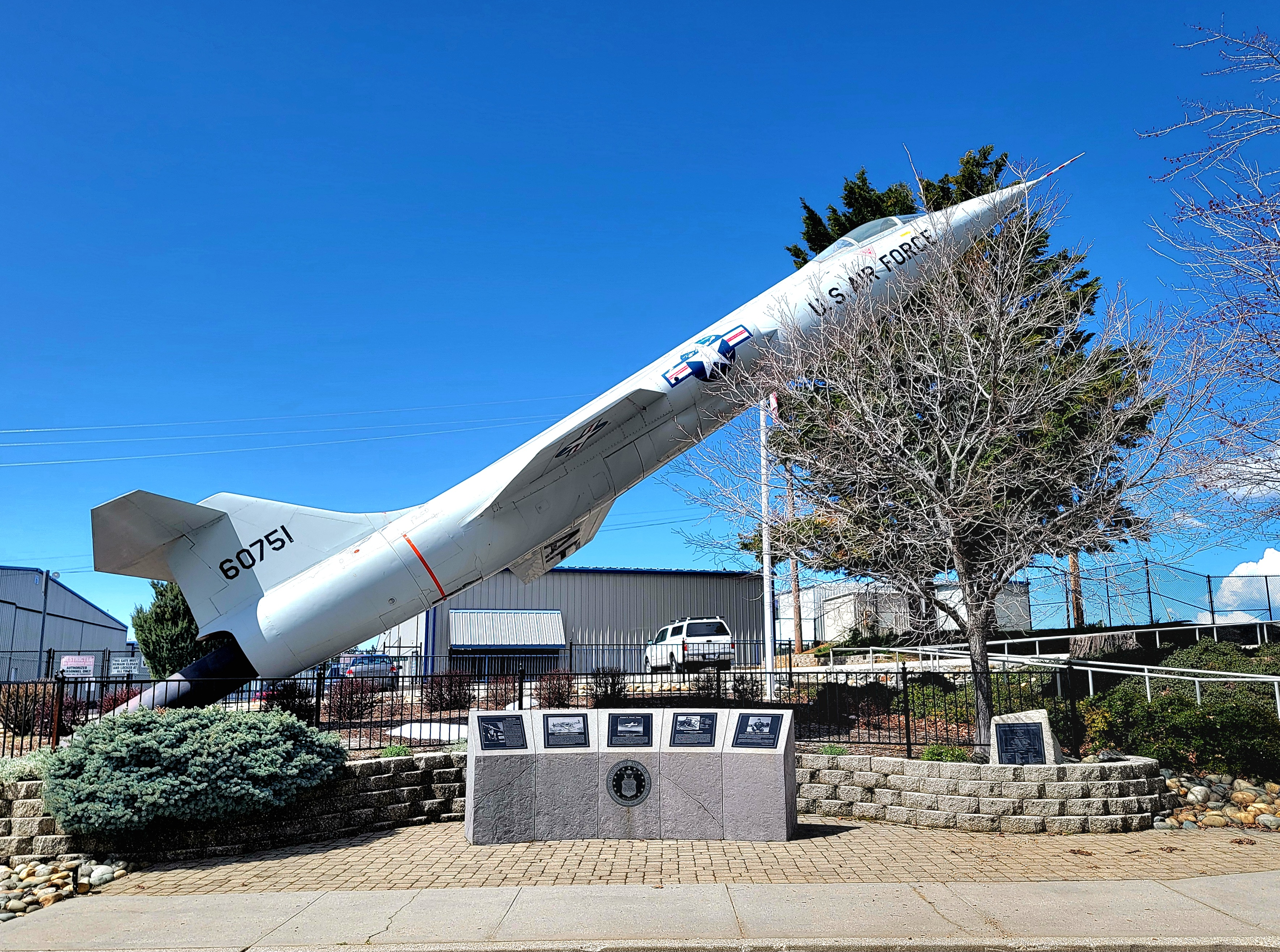
Chuck Yeager monument at the Nevada County Airport near Grass Valley, California

Yeager Airport in Charleston, West Virginia, is named in his honor. The Interstate 64/Interstate 77 bridge over the Kanawha River in Charleston is named in his honor. He also flew directly under the Kanawha Bridge and West Virginia named it the Chuck E. Yeager Bridge. On October 19, 2006, the state of West Virginia also honored Yeager with a marker along Corridor G (part of U.S. Highway 119) in his home Lincoln County, and also renamed part of it the Yeager Highway.

Yeager was an honorary board member of the humanitarian organization Wings of Hope. On August 25, 2009, Governor Arnold Schwarzenegger and Maria Shriver announced that Yeager would be one of 13 California Hall of Fame inductees in The California Museum's yearlong exhibit. The induction ceremony was on December 1, 2009, in Sacramento, California. Flying Magazine ranked Yeager number 5 on its 2013 list of The 51 Heroes of Aviation; for many years, he was the highest-ranked living person on the list.

The Civil Air Patrol, the volunteer auxiliary of the USAF, awards the Charles E. "Chuck" Yeager Award to its senior members as part of its Aerospace Education program.

Badges, patches and tabs
	U.S. Air Force Command Pilot Badge
Personal decorations
	Air Force Distinguished Service Medal (retirement award in 1975)
	Distinguished Service Medal (Army design awarded in 1954)
	Silver Star with bronze oak leaf cluster (for shooting down five Messerschmitt Bf 109s in one day)
Width-44 crimson ribbon with a pair of width-2 white stripes on the edges	Legion of Merit with bronze oak leaf cluster
	Distinguished Flying Cross with two bronze oak leaf clusters (for a Messerschmitt Me 262 kill and first to break the sound barrier)
	Bronze Star Medal with bronze valor device (for helping rescue a fellow airman from Occupied France)
	Purple Heart
	Air Medal with two silver oak leaf clusters
	Air Force Commendation Medal
	Presidential Medal of Freedom
Unit awards
	Presidential Unit Citation with bronze oak leaf cluster
	Air Force Outstanding Unit Award
Campaign and service medals
	American Defense Service Medal
	American Campaign Medal
	European-African-Middle Eastern Campaign Medal with silver and one bronze service star
	World War II Victory Medal
	Army of Occupation Medal with "Germany" clasp
	National Defense Service Medal with star
	Armed Forces Expeditionary Medal
	Vietnam Service Medal with two campaign stars
	Air Force Longevity Service Ribbon with one silver and one bronze oak leaf clusters
	Air Force Small Arms Expert Marksmanship Ribbon
Foreign awards
	Tongil Medal of the South Korean Order of National Security Merit
	Chevalier of the French Legion of Honour
	Republic of Vietnam Gallantry Cross Unit Citation
	Republic of Vietnam Campaign Medal

=== Other achievements ===
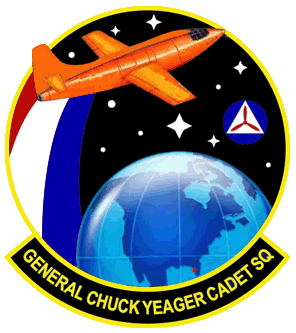
Old emblem of the General Chuck Yeager Cadet Squadron (formerly of the Civil Air Patrol)

- 1940–1949 – Harmon Trophy: Citation of Honorable Mention
- 1947 – Collier Trophy and Mackay Trophy, for breaking the sound barrier for the first time.
- 1953 – Harmon Trophy
- 1976 – Congressional Silver Medal

== Dates of rank ==
Insignia	Rank	Service and Component	Date
no insignia at the time	Private	United States Army; Regular Army (Army Air Corps)	September 12, 1941
	Private first class to corporal	United States Army; Regular Army (Army Air Forces)	1941 to March 9, 1943
	Flight officer	United States Army; Army of the United States (Army Air Forces)	March 10, 1943
	Second lieutenant	United States Army; Army of the United States (Army Air Forces)	July 6, 1944
	First lieutenant	United States Army; Army of the United States (Army Air Forces)	September 4, 1944
	Captain	United States Army; Army of the United States (Army Air Forces)	October 24, 1944
	Second lieutenant	United States Army; Regular Army (Army Air Forces)	February 10, 1947 (accepted February 25, 1947, rank from July 6, 1944)
	First lieutenant	United States Army; Regular Army (Army Air Forces)	July 6, 1947
	Captain	United States Air Force	July 6, 1951
	Major	United States Air Force	February 15, 1951 (temporary); July 6, 1958 (permanent)
	Lieutenant colonel	United States Air Force	March 22, 1956 (temporary); August 1, 1964 (permanent)
	Colonel	United States Air Force	March 14, 1961 (temporary); September 20, 1967 (permanent)
	Brigadier general	United States Air Force	June 22, 1969

== Aerial victory credits ==
Date	#	Type	Location	Aircraft flown	Unit Assigned
March 4, 1944	1	Messerschmitt Bf 109	Kassel, Germany	P-51	363 FS, 357 FG
September 13, 1944	0.5	Bf 109	Kassel, Germany	P-51	363 FS, 357 FG
October 12, 1944	5	Bf 109	Hanover, Germany	P-51	363 FS, 357 FG
November 6, 1944	1	Messerschmitt Me 262	Assen, Germany	P-51	363 FS, 357 FG
November 27, 1944	4	Focke-Wulf Fw 190	Magdeburg, Germany	P-51	363 FS, 357 FG

== Personal life ==
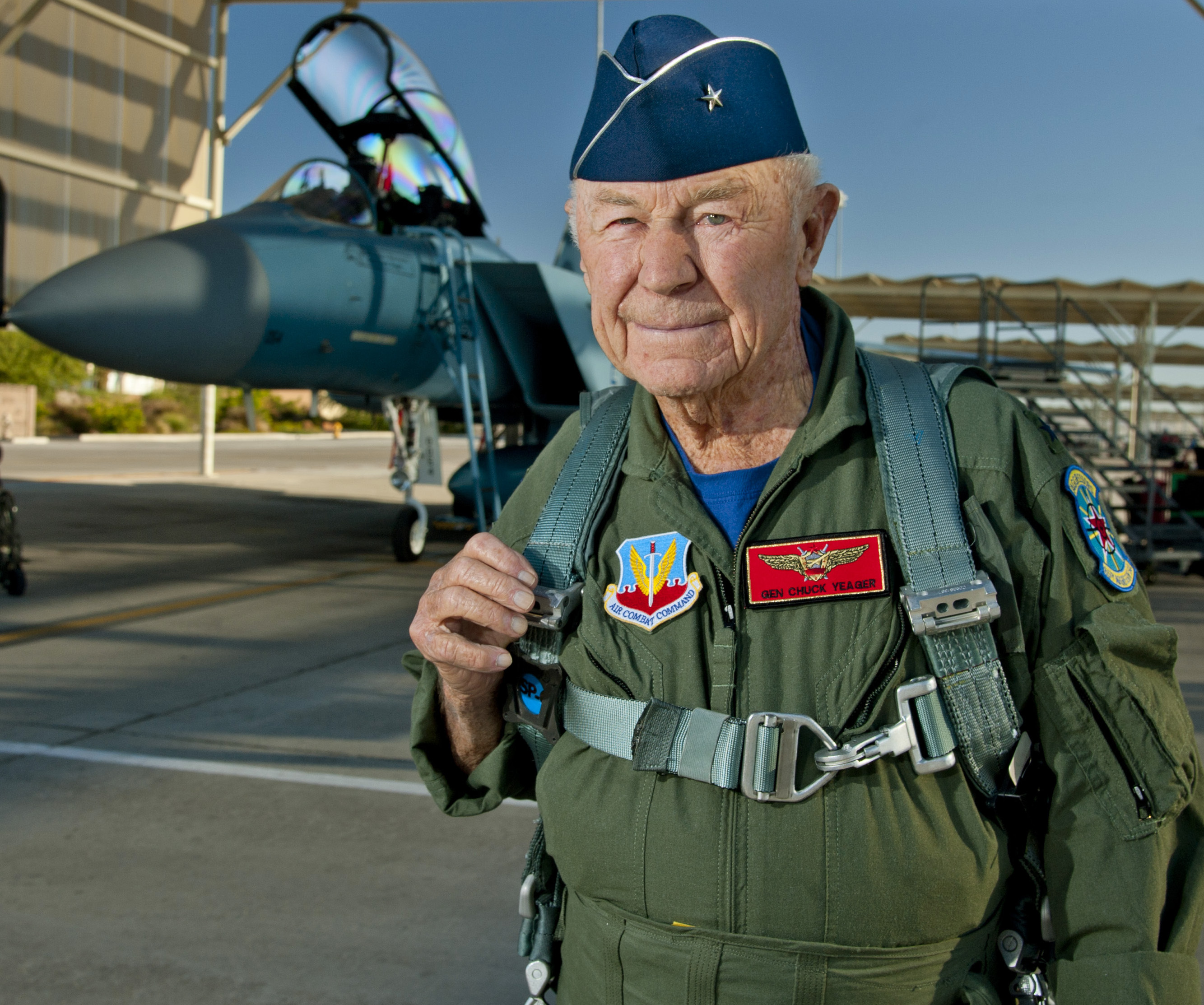
On October 14, 2012, Yeager co-piloted a new Glamorous Glennis III F-15D Eagle to commemorate the 65th anniversary of his historic flight.

On February 26, 1945, Yeager married Glennis Dickhouse. The couple had four children (Susan, Don, Mickey, and Sharon). Glennis Yeager died on December 22, 1990 after two bouts of ovarian cancer, predeceasing her husband by 30 years. Yeager named his plane after his wife, Glennis, as a good-luck charm: "You're my good-luck charm, hon. Any airplane I name after you always brings me home." Yeager and Glennis moved to Grass Valley, California, after his retirement from the Air Force in 1975. The couple prospered as a result of Yeager's best-selling autobiography, speaking engagements, and commercial ventures. Yeager's son Mickey (Michael) died unexpectedly in Oregon, on March 26, 2011.

Yeager appeared in a Texas advertisement for George H. W. Bush's 1988 presidential campaign. In 2000, Yeager met actress Victoria Scott D'Angelo on a hiking trail in Nevada County. The pair started dating shortly thereafter, and married in August 2003. A bitter dispute arose between Yeager, his children, and D'Angelo. The children contended that she, at least 35 years Yeager's junior, had married him for his fortune. Yeager and D'Angelo both denied the charge. Litigation ensued, in which his children accused D'Angelo of "undue influence" on Yeager, and Yeager accused his children of diverting millions of dollars from his assets. In August 2008, the California Court of Appeal ruled for Yeager, finding that his daughter Susan had breached her duty as trustee.

Yeager lived in Grass Valley, Northern California and died in the afternoon of December 7, 2020 (National Pearl Harbor Remembrance Day), at age 97, in a Los Angeles hospital. Following his death, President Donald Trump issued a statement of condolences stating Yeager "was one of the greatest pilots in history, a proud West Virginian, and an American original who relentlessly pushed the boundaries of human achievement".

== See also ==
- History of aviation
- List of firsts in aviation
- Society of Experimental Test Pilots
