= List of Russian defectors =

- List of Commonwealth of Independent States defectors (post 1991)
- List of Soviet and Eastern Bloc defectors (1924-1991)
- List of Cold War pilot defections
- List of KGB defectors
