= Giliogiris =

- Village
- Location of Giliogiris in Lithuania
- Coordinates: 55°45′00″N 22°00′29″E
- Country: Lithuania
- County: Telšiai County
- Municipality: Rietavas

Population (2011)
  - Total: 154
- Time zone: UTC+2 (EET)
  - Summer (DST): UTC+3 (EEST)

Giliogiris is a village in Rietavas municipality, in Telšiai County, in western Lithuania. According to the 2011 census, the village has a population of 154 people.

== Notable people ==
- Jonas Pleškys (1935-1993), Soviet Navy submarine tender captain.
- Eugenija Pleškytė (1938-2012), Lithuanian actress
