= Rolf Starost =

German football player

Personal information
- Date of birth: 25 June 1942 (age 84)
- Position: Defender

Senior career*
Years	Team	Apps	(Gls)
1950s–1961	SC Dynamo Berlin		
1962–1963	Viktoria Köln	2	

International career
1959–?	East Germany (Junior level)		
- * Club domestic league appearances and goals

Rolf Starost (born 25 June 1942) is a German former professional footballer who played as a defender for East Berlin club SC Dynamo Berlin and for Viktoria Köln. Starost is a multiple East Germany national football team junior international.

== Sporting career ==
As a junior player, Starost was active at the East Berlin police club SC Dynamo Berlin. With them, in 1960 he became a GDR junior master. A year earlier, he had been appointed to the Junior National Team of the GDR for which he played his first international match on 23 March 1959. In the GDR - France match (3–1), he played as central defender. Until 1960, he played a total of eight junior country games. For the 1961–62 season, Starost was recorded in the DDR-Oberliga of the SC Dynamo, but did not play until the tenth match of the season in the encounter Motor Zwickau - SC Dynamo (3–1 loss) as a right-wing defender because the regular player Konrad Dorner was injured. Until the summer break, Starost contested the three remaining league games. On 13 August 1961, he competed in his last game for SC Dynamo Berlin. He used the opportunity on the day of the construction of the Berlin Wall, together with his club mate Emil Poklitar after a friendly match at the Danish club Boldklubben af 1893 to defect to West Berlin.

In West Berlin, Starost first joined Tennis Borussia Berlin, but was not able to play, because the East German Football Association had managed to impose a one-year ban because of the unauthorized league change. For the 1962–63 season, Starost moved to Viktoria Köln in the Oberliga West, then one of the five highest play classes of the DFB. However, he was used under coach Hennes Weisweiler in only two league games. A season later, Starost no longer belonged to Cologne and later no longer appeared in higher-class football.

In 1965 he went to a course for coaching at the Hennes-Weisweiler-Akademie and worked as a graduate sports teacher.
