= Anatoly Kosov =

Soviet naval officer

Anatoly Mikhailovich Kosov
- Born: 19 November 1927; Alexandrovskoye, Stavropol Krai, Russian SFSR, Soviet Union
- Died: 11 February 1995 (aged 70) Moscow, Russia
- Buried: Troyekurovskoye Cemetery
- Allegiance: Soviet Union
- Branch: Soviet Navy
- Service years: 1949-1987
- Rank: Vice-Admiral
- Commands: Baltic Fleet
- Conflicts: Soviet–Japanese War
- Awards: Order of the Red Banner of Labour; Order of the Red Star

Anatoly Mikhailovich Kosov (Russian: Анатолий Михайлович Косов; 19 November 1927 – 11 February 1995) was an officer of the Soviet Navy. He reached the rank of vice-admiral, and served as commander of the Baltic Fleet between 1975 and 1978.

== Biography ==
Kosov was born on 19 November 1927 in Alexandrovskoye, Stavropol Krai, in what was then the Russian Soviet Federative Socialist Republic, in the Soviet Union. He enrolled as a cadet at the Caspian Higher Naval School in 1945, graduating in 1949 and being assigned to the Caspian Flotilla. Here he rose from the positions of commander of a shipboard combat unit, to assistant commander, and then commander of a large anti-submarine vessel. In 1954, he transferred to the Northern Fleet, serving as assistant commander, and then commander of a patrol ship. In 1958, Kosov enrolled in the Naval Academy for further studies, graduating in 1961.

Kosov then returned to the Northern Fleet, and began service aboard the nuclear submarines then entering service. He was executive officer aboard the Hotel-class submarine K-61, and then commander of the Golf-class K-88. In 1964, he was appointed chief of staff of a separate brigade of submarines, then chief of staff of a division, and finally commander of the 16th Submarine Division, being promoted to rear-admiral on 29 April 1970. In 1971, he joined the Baltic Fleet as its chief of staff, being promoted to vice-admiral on 2 February 1972. He served in this role until 1 September 1975, when he was appointed the fleet's commander.

During his time in command Kosov oversaw the introduction of new ships and technologies, and the conduct of large scale exercises held in the Atlantic and the Mediterranean Sea. But within a couple of months in his new role, he was faced with a mutiny aboard one of his ships, when in November 1975, the frigate Storozhevoy's political officer, captain 3rd rank Valery Sablin took over the ship and sailed her from Riga into the Baltic Sea. Kosov ordered the other ships in Riga to give chase, catching up with her. He radioed Sablin, ordering him to turn back, but Sablin refused. The pursuing vessels asked for permission to fire on Storozhevoy's bridge with their naval guns, a request Kosov denied. The Storozhevoy was eventually damaged by air-dropped bombs, leaving her unable to continue her course, and the mutiny failed. Kosov left the post of commander on 2 June 1978, being appointed Deputy Commander-in-Chief of the Navy for Naval Educational Institutions and Head of Naval Educational Institutions.

Kosov retired from active service in August 1987, but continued to work in research organizations. He died in Moscow on 11 February 1995, and was buried in the city's Troyekurovskoye Cemetery.

== Honours and awards ==
Over his career Kosov received the Order of the Red Banner of Labour, the Order of the Red Star, as well as various medals.
