= Valery Sablin =

Soviet naval officer and mutineer (1939–1976)

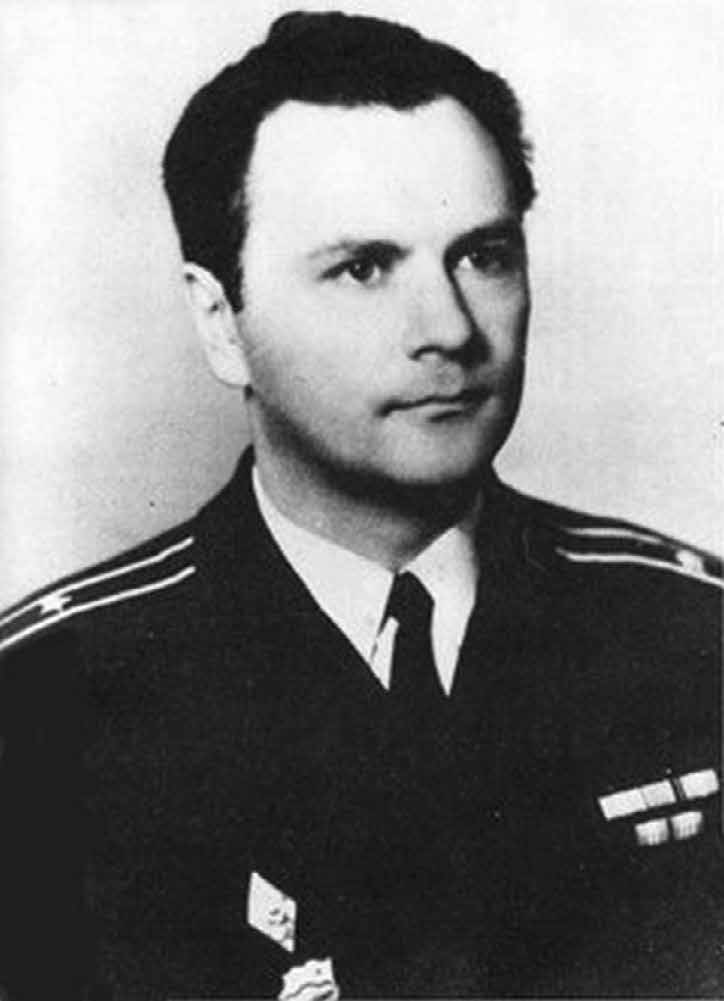
- Sablin in the early 1970s
- Native name: Валерий Саблин
- Born: Valery Mikhailovich Sablin; 1 January 1939; Leningrad, Russian SFSR, Soviet Union
- Died: 3 August 1976 (aged 37) Moscow, Russian SFSR, Soviet Union
- Allegiance: Soviet Union
- Branch: Soviet Navy
- Service years: 1956–1975
- Rank: Captain 3rd rank (stripped)
- Commands: Political officer, Storozhevoy (1973–1975)
- Conflicts: Mutiny on Storozhevoy
- Awards: Order "For Service to the Homeland in the Armed Forces of the USSR", 3rd Class (stripped)

Valery Mikhailovich Sablin (Russian: Валерий Михайлович Саблин; 1 January 1939 – 3 August 1976) was a Soviet Navy officer and member of the Communist Party who in November 1975, while serving as the political officer on the anti-submarine frigate Storozhevoy, led a mutiny against the Soviet state. Sablin's stated aim was to seize control of the ship, sail it from Riga to Leningrad, and broadcast a nationwide address protesting the widespread corruption and stagnation of the Brezhnev era, calling for a return to Leninist principles and a new communist revolution.

The mutiny was suppressed by Soviet naval and air forces while the ship was still en route. Sablin was arrested, court-martialed, and convicted of high treason. He was executed by firing squad in August 1976. His second-in-command, Seaman Alexander Shein, was sentenced to eight years in prison. The incident remained largely classified and suppressed by the Soviet government until the dissolution of the Soviet Union. The story became known in the West, albeit often inaccurately, and served as the inspiration for Tom Clancy's 1984 novel The Hunt for Red October. In 1994, the Military Collegium of the Supreme Court of the Russian Federation posthumously reviewed Sablin's case, commuting the treason charge to lesser military offenses but upholding the original sentence.

== Early life and education ==
Valery Sablin was born on 1 January 1939 in Leningrad, Russian SFSR, the son of a naval officer, Mikhail Petrovich Sablin. His family had a strong naval tradition; his father and maternal grandfather were naval officers, and his paternal great-grandfather had gone down with the cruiser Pallada in World War I.

During World War II, Sablin's father served with the Northern Fleet and participated in the defense of Allied Arctic convoys that delivered vital supplies to the Soviet war effort. Valery and his mother Anna spent his early childhood in Polyarny, the headquarters of the Northern Fleet, located above the Arctic Circle. He recalled German bombing raids and his mother hurrying them to bomb shelters. In the early 1950s, the family moved to Gorky, where Sablin's father taught military science until his retirement.

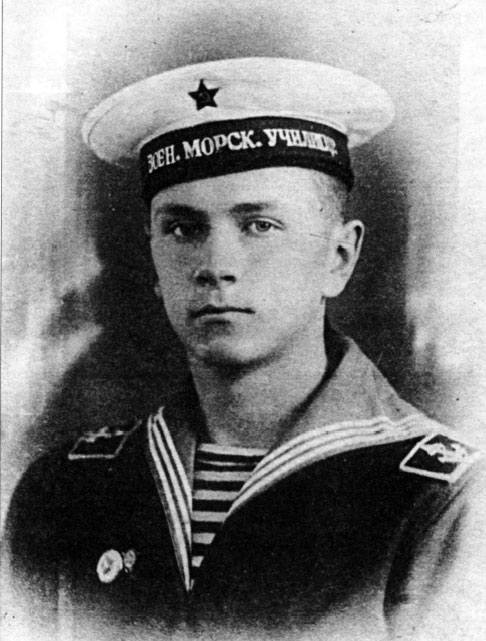
Sablin as a naval cadet, 1956

Bored with provincial life, Sablin sought the excitement of the major cities and decided to follow his family's naval tradition. In 1956, at age 17, he entered the prestigious M.V. Frunze Higher Naval School in Leningrad. Many of his classmates were sons of naval officers or party officials. Sablin was an ardent believer in Communist ideals and the principles of Leninism. He excelled as a cadet, was noted for his dedication, became a company commander, and was one of the first in his class to join the Communist Party. His peers regarded him as the "class conscience". He graduated with distinction in November 1960.

== Naval career ==
Upon graduation, Sablin was commissioned as a lieutenant and assigned to the Soviet Northern Fleet in Severomorsk. He served aboard the destroyers Svedushiy and later Ozhestochenniy. His first command was an anti-aircraft section, followed by command of a division. Like other junior officers, he had to qualify first as a specialist in his field (navigation) before undertaking officer-of-the-deck qualifications. His commanders praised his performance; the captain of Ozhestochenniy wrote to Sablin's father in 1965 commending Valery as a "devoted Communist and an exemplary naval officer" who was held up as an example to the ship's company.

In 1963, while on temporary duty in Murmansk, Sablin wrote a letter to Nikita Khrushchev, then First Secretary of the Communist Party, criticizing the party leadership and arguing it "needed to rid itself of sycophants and corrupt officials on the take". He was reprimanded by the Murmansk Party Committee but suffered no permanent damage to his career, although his promotion to senior lieutenant was delayed by almost a year.

In September 1963, Ozhestochenniy was transferred to the Black Sea Fleet, based in Sevastopol. Two years later, the ship returned to the Northern Fleet at Severomorsk, where Sablin remained until 1969.

=== Political officer ===
In 1969, Sablin was assigned to shore duty and entered the V.I. Lenin Military-Political Academy in Moscow, the training ground for the navy's political officers (zampolits). This was an unusual move for a promising line officer, as zampolits were generally older officers passed over for command or career political officers chosen for party loyalty. Sablin's commanding officer on Ozhestochenniy was reluctant to approve the transfer, seeing Sablin as a potential ship captain, but Sablin himself had requested it four years earlier. By choosing the zampolit path, Sablin opted for a specialist career over a command track. Promotion was faster as a specialist, but this was likely not Sablin's motivation.

The zampolit was a descendant of the World War II–era political commissar, serving as the Communist Party's watchdog within the military. Unlike the earlier commissars who held equal rank with the unit commander, the zampolit was subordinate to the commanding officer but answered to a separate political chain of command. On major warships, the zampolit was third in command, after the captain and the executive officer (starpom), and was required to qualify as an underway watch officer. The role involved political indoctrination, managing the ship's library and "Red corners" (political altars), promoting party campaigns, organizing "socialist competitions", and acting as a combination personnel officer, chaplain, and welfare/recreation officer. Sablin graduated from the academy with distinction in June 1973; his name was carved onto the marble roll of honor there. On 9 August 1973, he was assigned as zampolit aboard the anti-submarine frigate Storozhevoy.

== Disillusionment and motivations ==
During his time at the Lenin Military-Political Academy (1969–1973), Sablin became increasingly disillusioned with the Soviet system. He had been inspired by the Khrushchev Thaw of the late 1950s and early 1960s, which he experienced as a cadet through interactions with university students like his cousin Tamara, who shared prohibited writings and provocative poetry. He was deeply disturbed by the 1968 Warsaw Pact invasion of Czechoslovakia, which crushed the Prague Spring reforms.

Sablin contrasted the ideals of Leninism and the October Revolution with the reality of the Brezhnev era, which he viewed as characterized by stagnation, corruption, hypocrisy, and the entrenchment of a privileged elite (nomenklatura). He remained a fervent believer in Leninist principles, arguing that the system had been betrayed by its custodians. He believed that the widespread dissatisfaction in Soviet society, manifesting as apathy and cynicism, could only be countered by a return to true Leninist ideals through a new revolution. He later wrote that the state and party machinery had become so heavily armored against criticism that it needed to be broken from within.

His time in Moscow coincided with a period of relative family stability. He had married Nina Mikhailovna Chumazova, a university student he met in Leningrad, in 1960. Their son, Mikhail, was born in September 1962. While his earlier sea duty often kept him away, his academy posting allowed more time with his family. He maintained close ties with his parents and brothers, often visiting them in Gorky. He was a voracious reader, collected materials on the 1905 Potemkin mutiny and the mutineer Lieutenant Pyotr Schmidt, and was a talented amateur artist. His wife Nina noted his strong interest in politics and his tendency to discuss it openly, which worried her given the totalitarian nature of the state.

== Mutiny on Storozhevoy ==
=== Background ===
Storozhevoy (Russian: Сторожевой, meaning "Sentry" or "Guardian") was a Soviet Krivak I–class anti-submarine frigate (Russian designation: Bolshoi Protivolodochniy Korabl, BPK). Commissioned in December 1973, it was assigned to the Baltic Fleet and based at Baltiysk near Kaliningrad.

Before the mutiny, Storozhevoy had an active service history. In October 1974, it sailed to Rostock, East Germany, for the 25th anniversary of the country, and in the spring of 1975, it participated in the large-scale naval exercise Okean-75 in the Atlantic, followed by a port call to Havana, Cuba, and further exercises in the Baltic Sea. In early November 1975, Storozhevoy sailed from Baltiysk to Riga to participate in celebrations marking the 58th anniversary of the October Revolution. Sablin chose this timing deliberately, linking his planned action to the historical revolution. The ship was scheduled to receive a new crew in Liepāja shortly after the Riga visit before transferring to the Pacific Fleet; this imminent change likely created a "now or never" situation for Sablin.

=== Planning ===
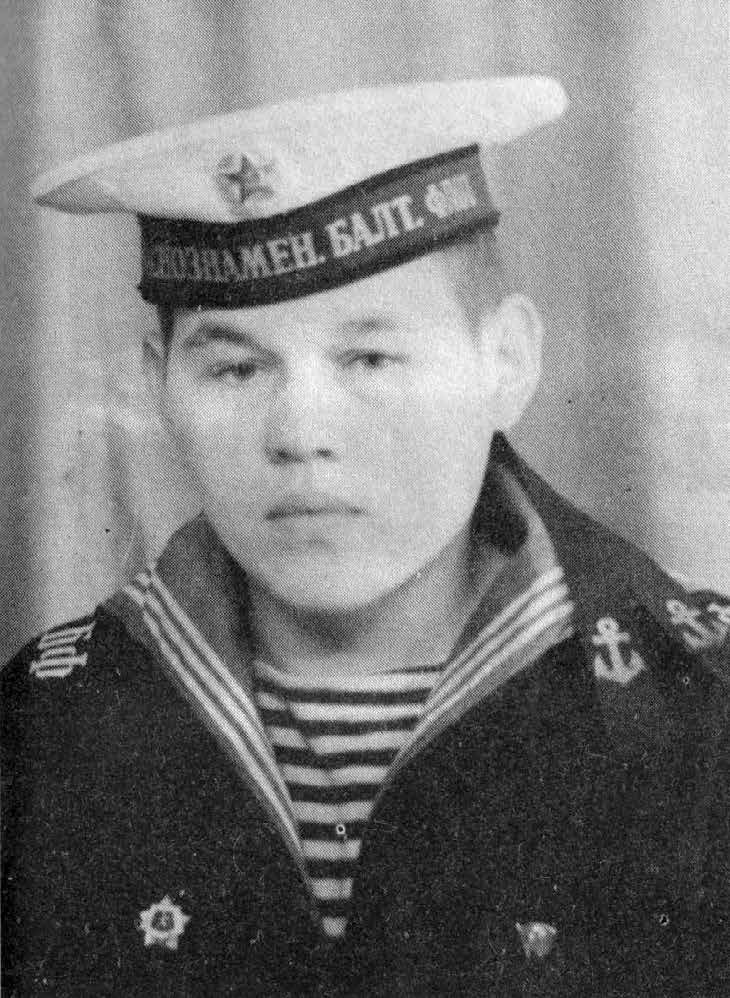
Alexander Shein, Sablin's right-hand man during the mutiny

Sablin began planning his action months in advance. In April 1975, during a deployment in the Atlantic, he recorded several political speeches on tape outlining his critique of the Soviet system and his call for a return to Leninist principles. He believed he needed to seize control of the ship and use its radio equipment to broadcast his message nationally. His ultimate goal was to sail the ship to Leningrad, dock alongside the museum ship Aurora (a symbol of the 1917 revolution), and incite a nationwide uprising against the Brezhnev regime. He drew inspiration from historical Russian revolts, particularly the 1905 mutiny on the battleship Potemkin.

Sablin needed accomplices. His primary recruit was Seaman Alexander Shein, the ship's artist, a 20-year-old former dropout with a minor criminal record for theft whom Sablin had taken under his wing. On 5 November, Sablin revealed his plan to Shein, initially causing Shein distress and fear that Sablin might be a foreign spy. Sablin reassured him, and Shein agreed to participate, subsequently recruiting a few other sailors, including Mikhail Burov, Vladimir Averin, Salivonchik, and Manko. Sablin provided Shein with an unloaded Makarov pistol and one of the recorded tapes to be played to the crew. He also purchased padlocks in Kaliningrad a month earlier to confine potential opponents.

=== Seizure of the ship (8 November) ===
Mutiny on Storozhevoy
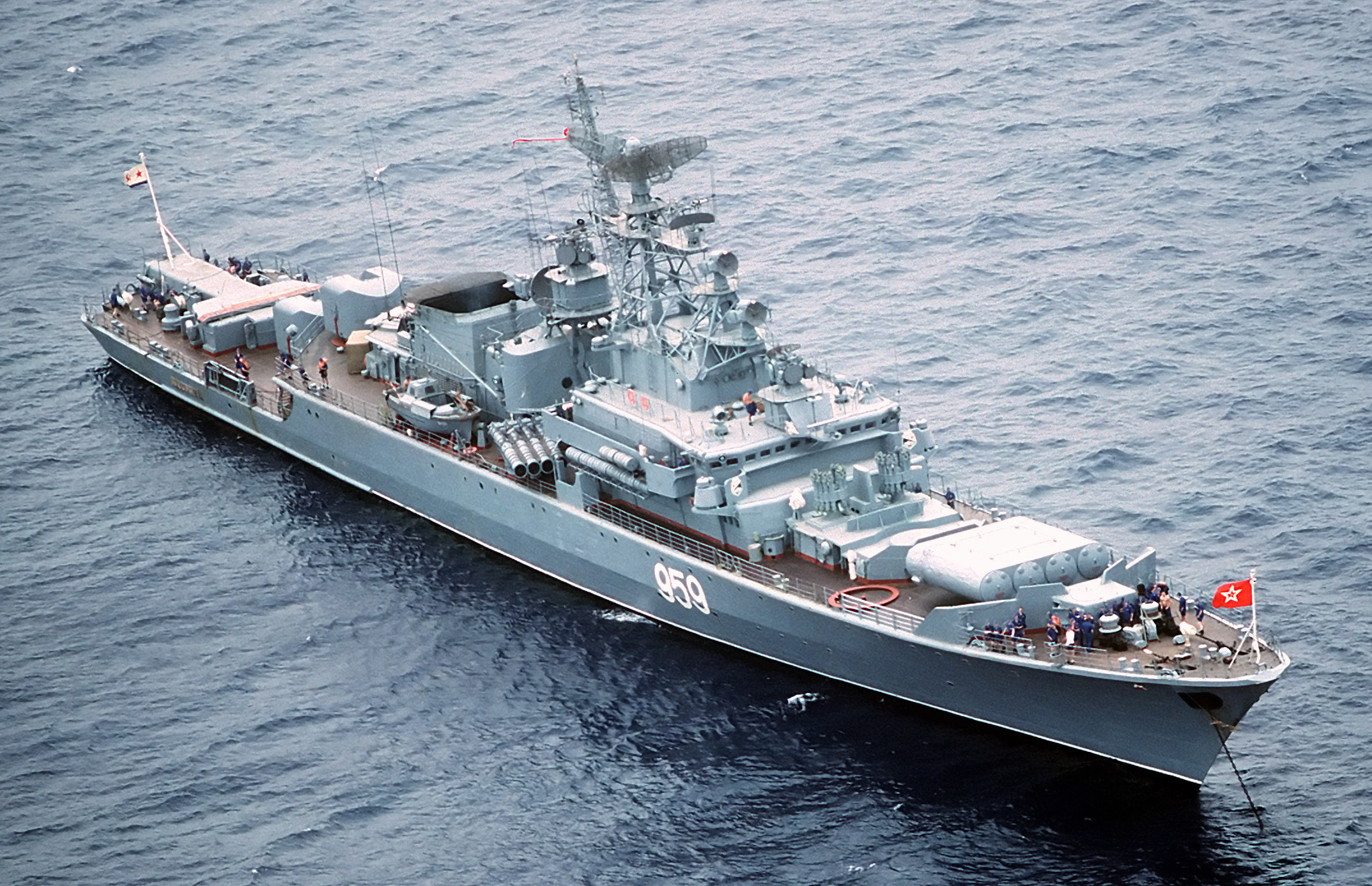
- A Krivak I–class frigate similar to Storozhevoy
Date	8–9 November 1975
Location	Gulf of Riga and Baltic Sea
Result	Mutiny suppressed: Sablin executed for treason; Shein imprisoned for 8 years; Other participants disciplined; Incident silenced by Soviet authorities

Belligerents
Mutineers	Soviet Union: Soviet Navy; Soviet Air Forces; KGB Border Troops

Commanders and leaders
Valery Sablin (executed); Alexander Shein (surrendered)	Leonid Brezhnev; Andrei Grechko; Sergey Gorshkov; Anatoly Potulniy

Strength
1 frigate; ~8 officers and ~150 enlisted crew	Multiple naval vessels; ~30+ aircraft

Casualties and losses
1 wounded (Sablin)	Friendly fire damage to Komsomolets Litvy

On the evening of 8 November 1975, while Storozhevoy was moored in the Daugava River in Riga, Sablin put his plan into action. Around 7:00 PM, he lured the ship's captain, Anatoly Potulniy, to the forward sonar compartment on the lower deck under the pretext of dealing with drunken sailors. Once Potulniy entered the empty compartment, Sablin locked him inside, leaving a letter explaining his actions.

At 7:30 PM, Sablin summoned the ship's officers (excluding those on leave or liberty) to the warrant officers' stateroom. He informed them that he had confined the captain and intended to sail to Leningrad to start a new revolution. He presented them with chess pieces, asking those who supported him to take a white piece and those opposed a black one. The vote split evenly: eight officers supported Sablin, while eight opposed him. Sablin locked the dissenting officers in a separate compartment below decks. He assured them they would not be harmed and that this confinement would protect them if the mutiny failed. Shein, armed with the now-loaded pistol, stood guard outside the meeting room.

That night, Sablin had selected Sergei Eisenstein's 1925 film Battleship Potemkin for a screening on the ship. Around 10:10 PM, he assembled the remaining crew (about 150 enlisted men) on the quarterdeck and delivered an impassioned speech, denouncing the corruption and stagnation of the Brezhnev era and calling for a return to true Leninist principles. He asked for their support to sail to Leningrad and initiate a revolution, falsely claiming they had support from other naval units. The crew, inspired or perhaps coerced by the circumstances, overwhelmingly agreed to support the mutiny. Sablin's supporters were armed with pistols and automatic rifles from the ship's armory.

However, the plan began to unravel. Senior Lieutenant Vladimir Firsov, the ship's electronics officer and party secretary who had initially voted to support Sablin, changed his mind. Around 10:30 PM, Firsov escaped by climbing down a mooring line to the submarine S-263 moored nearby. He alerted its captain, L. V. Svetlovski, who was initially skeptical but eventually sent Firsov ashore to notify the authorities. This loss of surprise forced Sablin to accelerate his timeline.

=== Dash from Riga (9 November) ===
Map with modern borders; Storozhevoy was stopped at 57°58′6″N 21°2′9″E

Around 11:00 PM on 8 November, Sablin ordered the crew to weigh anchor. The ship departed Riga around 2:15 AM on 9 November. While maneuvering out of the Daugava River, Storozhevoy lightly collided with the submarine moored ahead. With Petty Officer First Class Soloviev at the helm, the ship headed north towards the Gulf of Riga. Sablin initially kept the ship's main radar off to avoid detection.

By 3:00 AM, Soviet authorities in Riga were aware of the situation. Vice Admiral Anatoly Kosov, Baltic Fleet chief of staff, ordered pursuit vessels, including KGB Border Troops patrol boats, to intercept Storozhevoy. The first pursuit ship, SKR-14, departed Riga around 3:00 AM. A larger force departed from Liepāja around 6:30 AM, led by Captain 1st Rank Rassukovannyy aboard the patrol ship Komsomolets Litvy.

Sablin realized he no longer had time to reach Leningrad directly. He set a course westward (approx. 290 degrees) through the Irben Strait, the passage between Saaremaa island and the Latvian coast, heading for international waters in the Baltic Sea. His fallback plan was possibly to reach Sweden or to broadcast his message to the world via the United Nations.

Around 4:00 AM, Sablin ordered the ship's radioman, Nikolai Vinogradov, to begin broadcasting his pre-recorded message. However, Vinogradov, trained to use secure codes, transmitted the message only on encrypted military frequencies, not on open channels as Sablin likely intended. The broadcast detailed Sablin's critique of the Soviet regime and called for a popular uprising, declaring Storozhevoy "free and independent territory". Soviet commanders, including Admiral Sergey Gorshkov in Moscow, monitored the transmissions.

=== Pursuit and air attacks ===
The Soviet high command, fearing Sablin intended to defect to Sweden with a modern warship and its secrets, reacted decisively. Leonid Brezhnev personally authorized the use of deadly force. Around 6:00 AM, Defence Minister Marshal Andrei Grechko relayed the order to Admiral Gorshkov: "Bomb the ship and sink it!" By dawn on 9 November, Storozhevoy was in the Irben Strait, pursued by several KGB patrol boats, led by Captain 2nd Rank Neypert. These boats attempted to signal Storozhevoy to stop using flares, signal lamps, and bullhorns, but Sablin ignored them. Soviet Naval Aviation Ilyushin Il-38 reconnaissance aircraft located the frigate around 8:00 AM.

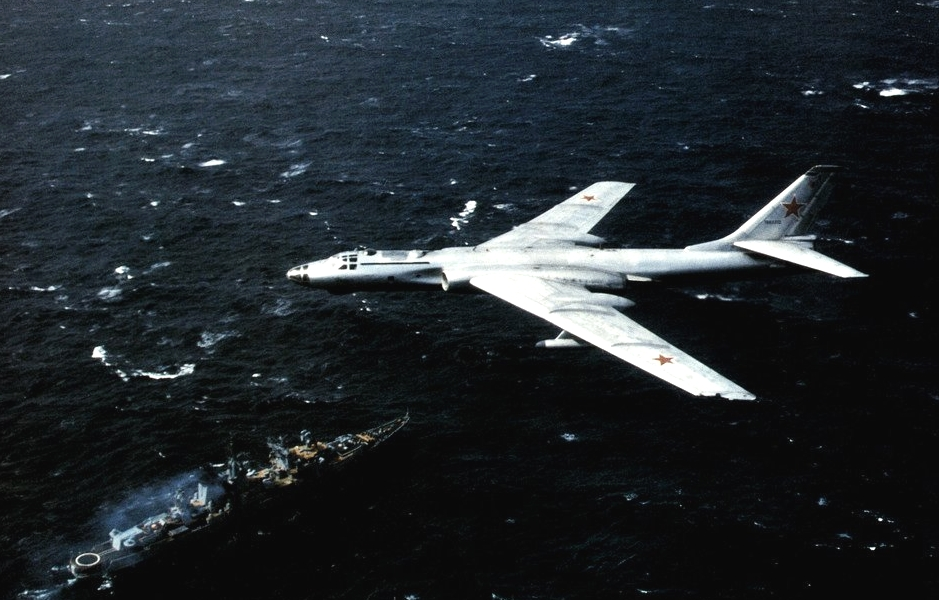
Tupolev Tu-16 bomber

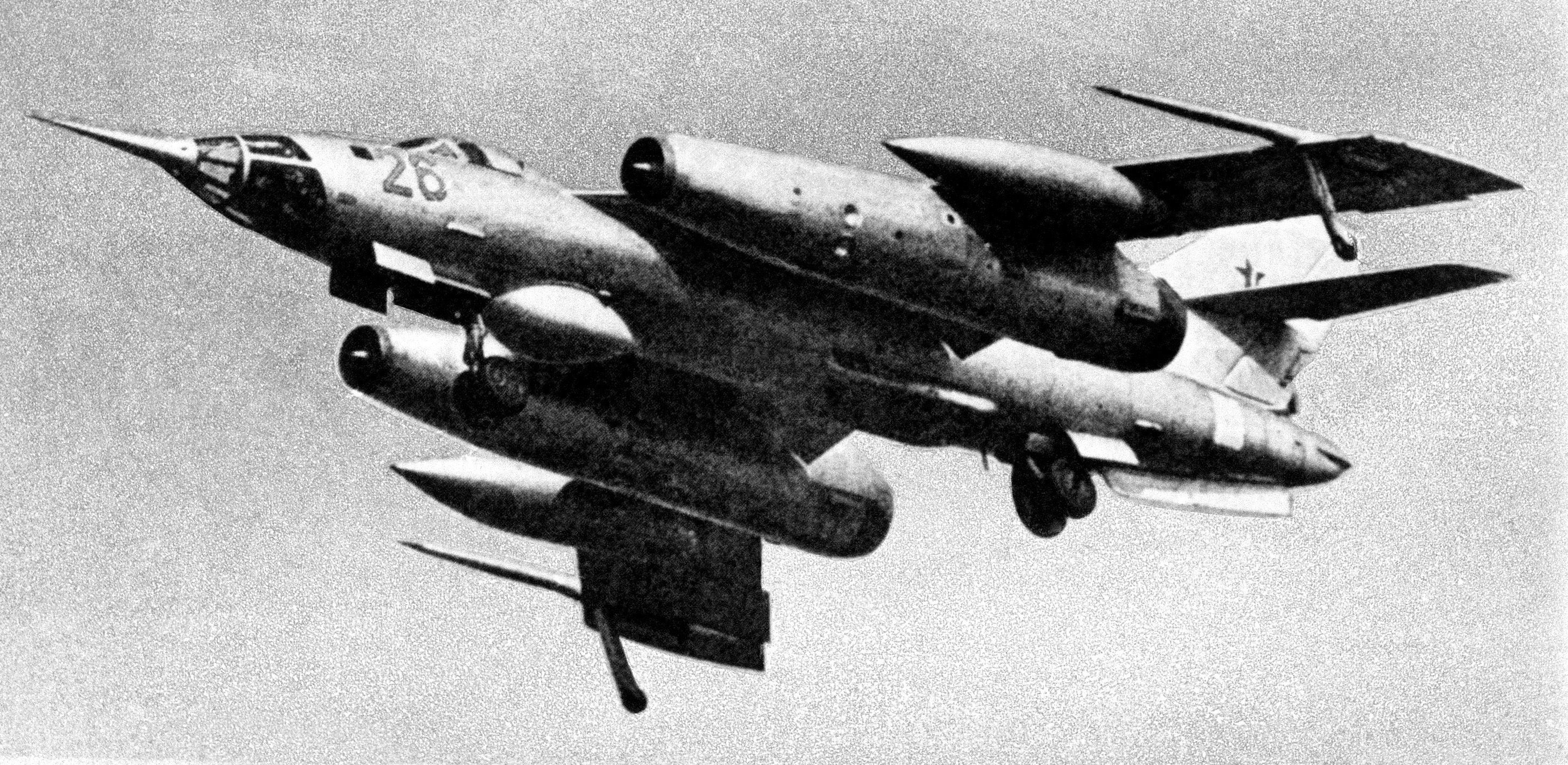
Yakovlev Yak-28 bomber

Multiple air units were scrambled. Nine Tupolev Tu-16K bombers from Bykhov Air Base, led by Colonel Arkhip Savinkov, arrived over the scene around 9:10 AM. They were armed with K-10S (AS-2 'Kipper') anti-ship missiles, potentially including nuclear-tipped versions intended for anti-carrier warfare, as they were likely the combat alert contingent. The bombers made low passes and fired warning shots from their tail cannons. Around 10:00 AM, Yakovlev Yak-28 bombers from the 668th Bomber Aviation Regiment based at Tukums Air Base also arrived. These aircraft, belonging to Frontal Aviation and inexperienced in naval targeting, mistakenly bombed the Soviet cargo ship Volgo-Balt 38 around 10:20 AM, causing no casualties. Shortly after, they also accidentally dropped bombs near the pursuing Komsomolets Litvy, causing minor damage and a fire.

Around 10:16 AM, Colonel General Gulyayev, commander of Baltic Fleet Naval Aviation, ordered Colonel Savinkov's Tu-16s to prepare for a missile launch, invoking the special protocol for nuclear weapons release. At 10:27 AM, Gulyayev confirmed the launch order. However, at 10:45 AM, Savinkov reported a radar malfunction (specifically, a magnetron failure), making a guided missile launch impossible. Whether this was genuine or a deliberate refusal to launch a potentially nuclear missile remains debated. The other two bombers were ordered to attack independently, but frantic radio calls countermanding the attack order came through at 10:46 AM, just before they could launch.

Meanwhile, Soviet Air Force Sukhoi Su-24 fighter-bombers from Tukums had also been scrambled. Between 10:25 AM and 10:32 AM, Yak-28s and possibly Su-24s made direct bombing and cannon attacks on Storozhevoy. The ship took several hits from 500-pound bombs and 30mm cannon fire, primarily aimed at the stern to disable the rudder and propulsion. Storozhevoy sustained damage, began taking on water, lost steering control, and started turning in circles.

=== End of the mutiny ===
The air attacks broke the resolve of the crew. Around 10:20 AM, several sailors, led by Petty Officer Kopilov, released Captain Potulniy and the other confined officers. Potulniy, armed with a pistol, rushed to the bridge. After a moment's hesitation, he shot Sablin in the leg and disarmed him. At 10:32 AM, Potulniy regained command and broadcast, "Cease fire, I have regained command of the ship!"

The mutiny was over. Storozhevoy was stopped in international waters, approximately 21 nautical miles (24 mi; 39 km) from Soviet territorial waters and 50 nautical miles (58 mi; 93 km) from Sweden. KGB patrol boats came alongside, and marines boarded the vessel, securing the crew.

== Arrest, trial, and execution ==
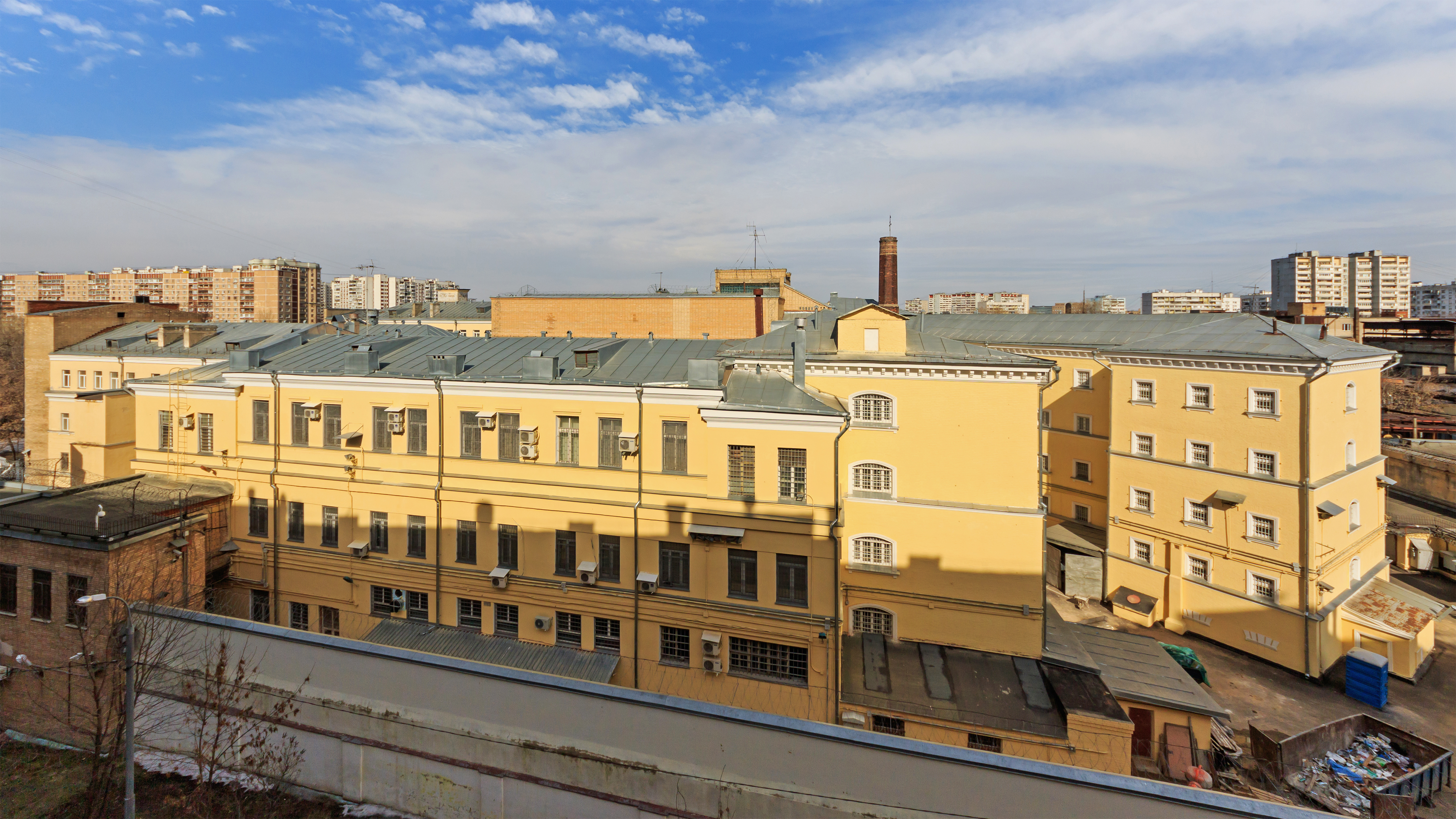
Lefortovo Prison, where Sablin was imprisoned and executed

Sablin, wounded, was carried off Storozhevoy on a stretcher. He and Shein, along with twelve other suspected ringleaders, were flown from Riga to Moscow and imprisoned in the KGB's Lefortovo Prison. The rest of the crew were detained at the Voroshilov Barracks in Riga and interrogated extensively by KGB officers and a high-level naval commission chaired by Admiral Gorshkov.

Sablin underwent months of interrogation, primarily by KGB Captain Oleg Dobrovolski. Dobrovolski described Sablin as a convinced, albeit misguided, idealist and fanatic, who could readily quote Marxist–Leninist texts to justify his actions. While Sablin admitted to violating his military oath during later interrogations, likely under pressure or duress (his wife later saw him with knocked-out teeth), he consistently denied committing treason. He maintained that his actions were intended to save Soviet socialism, not betray the Motherland.

The Soviet leadership initially struggled with how to frame the charges, reluctant to acknowledge the true nature of Sablin's political motivations. Defection to Sweden was an easier, though inaccurate, charge to manage politically. Ultimately, facing the Twenty-fifth Party Congress in February 1976, the KGB and Navy leadership reduced the number of men facing treason charges to just Sablin and Shein, likely to minimize perceived disciplinary problems in the fleet.

Sablin and Shein were tried in secret by the Military Collegium of the Supreme Court of the USSR, beginning on 13 July 1976. Sablin was represented by state-appointed lawyer Leonid Aksyenov, whom Sablin's family distrusted. Sablin reportedly pled guilty to treason, likely as part of a deal or under duress, accepting responsibility but asking for leniency for his crew. Despite this, he was sentenced to death by firing squad for treason under Article 64(a) of the RSFSR Penal Code. He was stripped of his rank and medals. Alexander Shein confessed, likely under intense pressure, to aiding treason and violating his oath; he was sentenced to eight years in prison and labor camp.

Sablin was executed by a single pistol shot to the back of the head in the basement of Lefortovo Prison on 3 August 1976. His family was not notified until February 1977, when his brother Nikolai received a death certificate listing the date of death but leaving the cause and place blank. His body's location remains unknown.

== Aftermath ==
The Soviet government suppressed all information about the mutiny for nearly fifteen years. Official denials were issued, and Storozhevoy, after repairs, was conspicuously displayed on patrol in the Baltic before being transferred to the Pacific Fleet in April 1976, effectively banished to Siberia. It remained there until decommissioned and sold for scrap to India in 2004.

The other twelve arrested mutineers were released from Lefortovo in March 1976 and likely faced disciplinary measures, including demotion and expulsion from the Komsomol, but avoided criminal charges. Most of the crew, including officers who opposed the mutiny, were dispersed throughout the navy, some suffering demotions or career setbacks. Captain Potulniy was reduced in rank and assigned to manage a warehouse ashore, his career ruined despite regaining control of his ship. Alexander Shein served five and a half years in Lefortovo and two and a half years in a labor camp before his release. As a former political prisoner, he faced discrimination and struggled personally and professionally after his release.

Sablin's family faced severe hardship. Nina Sablina and her son Mikhail were evicted from their naval housing in Baltiysk in May 1976. They moved to Leningrad, living in relative anonymity. Nina faced social ostracism, and Mikhail was barred from following his father into the navy. Valery's father died in January 1977 without knowing his son had already been executed; his mother died eighteen months later.

Despite the suppression, rumors of the mutiny circulated within the Soviet Navy and eventually reached the West via emigre sources and Swedish intelligence intercepts. Early Western press accounts, often inaccurate, sensationalized the event, frequently portraying it as an attempted mass defection or claiming high casualties.

== Legacy ==
The Storozhevoy mutiny gained international fame indirectly through Tom Clancy's 1984 debut novel, The Hunt for Red October, and its 1990 film adaptation. Clancy learned of the mutiny from Gregory D. Young's 1982 Naval Institute Press monograph based on his master's thesis. While Clancy adapted the core idea of a disillusioned officer seizing a Soviet vessel, he fictionalized the details significantly: the vessel became a ballistic missile submarine (Red October), the motive became defection to the United States, and the leader (Marko Ramius) succeeded. The novel itself briefly references the real mutiny, albeit inaccurately portraying Sablin as leading an enlisted mutiny aiming for Gotland and claiming multiple executions.

With the advent of glasnost in the late 1980s, information about the mutiny began to surface within the Soviet Union. Former naval officer and writer Nikolai Cherkashin championed Sablin's cause, publishing the first Soviet account of the mutiny in Pravda in 1990 after overcoming considerable official resistance. This led to a period of public discussion and historical reassessment of Sablin's actions.

In 1994, following appeals from Sablin's family and supporters, the Military Collegium of the Supreme Court of the Russian Federation reviewed the sentences of Sablin and Shein. The court partially rehabilitated both men, commuting the charge of treason (Article 64a) to lesser military crimes, specifically abuse of power and disobedience (Articles 252b and 252c). However, the court upheld the original sentences – death for Sablin and imprisonment for Shein – finding them guilty of the lesser charges. This partial rehabilitation acknowledged that Sablin was not a traitor but still deemed his actions criminal from a military standpoint. Full rehabilitation remains unlikely due to the nature of mutiny as a military crime.

Sablin remains a controversial figure. He is viewed by some as a heroic idealist who sacrificed himself in a quixotic attempt to reform a corrupt system according to true Leninist principles, while others see him as a dangerously naive or grandiose figure who irresponsibly risked the lives of his crew and potentially escalated Cold War tensions. His actions highlighted the deep-seated discontent within Soviet society and the military during the Era of Stagnation, and foreshadowed the eventual collapse of the Soviet Union.

== See also ==
- Kronstadt rebellion
- Soviet dissidents
