= Nora Kovach =

Hungarian ballerina (1931–2009)

Nora Kovach (13 June 1931 – 18 January 2009) was a Hungarian ballerina who defected in 1953 together with her husband and fellow ballet dancer Istvan Rabovsky, the first highly publicized defection of individuals in the field of dance to the West from the Soviet bloc.

== Early life and education ==
Kovach was raised in Budapest, and was trained as a dancer at the schools of the Budapest Opera Ballet and of the Kirov Ballet in Leningrad. As the leading dancers of the Budapest State Opera, Kovach and Rabovsky were sent on tour in May 1953 to East Berlin. With the Cold War intensifying, they disappeared from a scheduled performance and were able to board a subway train in a station located underneath their hotel and were able to escape to West Berlin, and freedom, by boarding a train.

== Career ==
Interviewed by Time magazine a few months after her defection, Kovach described the struggles in her mind after her defection, stating she couldn't sleep for two nights after her departure to the West "because I was thinking of mother, home, family. It's a very big problem. But freedom is better."

Promoted by impresario Sol Hurok, the couple performed with the Festival Ballet in London in their first performance in the West on August 25, 1953, receiving what was described as "an ovation of the first magnitude" for their appearance in Don Quixote by Ludwig Minkus.

The couple traveled to the United States, arriving in Hoboken, New Jersey on the SS Nieuw Amsterdam on November 13, 1953. In an interview with The New York Times upon their arrival in the U.S., Kovach described how their position as dancers with the Leningrad ballet meant that they "were members of the privileged class and had money, an automobile and a nice home but never what we wanted most — Freedom".

They appeared on television on Ed Sullivan's Toast of the Town in November 1953. Western audiences were dazzled by their strong Soviet-developed technique, but the New York Herald Tribune noted that "Certainly, the accent is upon virtuosity, occasionally at the expense of what we have come to regard as good balletic line" in a review of the couple's first stage performance on February 10, 1954. Kovach and Rabovsky appeared with ballet around the world, covering the United States, Europe, Japan and Latin America.

In 1956, Kovach and Rabovsky were among the passengers rescued from Italian ocean liner SS Andrea Doria after its 1956 collision with the MS Stockholm off of Nantucket, Massachusetts. The two appeared on The Ed Sullivan Show multiple times after their rescue. Shortly after their defection, the two were joined by their one time costume designer from the Budapest Opera House Magda Rosenberg née Markowicz.

They started their own troupe in the early 1960s called Bihari. Kovach opened a ballet school in Plainview, New York in 1969.

Kovach divorced Rabovsky, and married Tibor Szegezdy, who died in 1985, and was survived by her third husband, Steve Farago. She was also survived by a brother and two stepchildren.

== See also ==
- List of Soviet and Eastern Bloc defectors
