= Barratry (admiralty law) =

Gross misconduct by master or crew

In admiralty law, barratry is an act of gross misconduct committed by a master or crew of a vessel resulting in damage to the vessel or its cargo. Such acts may include desertion, illegal scuttling, theft of the ship or cargo, and any act carried out against the best interests of the shipowner.

As the law regards barratry as misconduct against the shipowner (or demise charterer), who is the only party having standing to sue for damages, any affected owners of cargo must normally bring claims against the shipowner (or demise charterer) for breach of contract of carriage in order to receive compensation.

== Description ==
Barratry is defined in the Marine Insurance Act 1906 as "every wrongful act wilfully committed by the master or crew to the prejudice of the owner, or, as the case may be, the charterer" and thus usually considered a crime against the ship's owner. Therefore, if the owner himself chooses to wreck the ship, no crime is committed, as the owner has simply destroyed his own property. However, his actions can constitute a crime against any other owners of the ship. Harm to the crew can constitute barratry regardless of who damages the vessel. Throughout the 19th century, U.S. courts struggled to define and understand the law of barratry. Courts have since concluded that negligence alone is not sufficient to qualify as barratry; rather, there must be an intentional act and an intent to defraud. Similarly, deviating from the assigned course does not itself constitute barratry.

Barratry differs from the crime of mutiny in which the crew disobeys the captain of the ship in that in the former case, the crew remains loyal to the captain, who disobeys the owner of the ship.

== Case law ==
The U.S. Supreme Court case Patapsco Insurance Company v. Coulter explored the meaning of barratry in detail. In that case, a ship was provisioned to sail to Gibraltar to sell flour, the profits of which were to have been used to purchase goods in Marseille. However, at Gibraltar, a fire started aboard ship and destroying it and the cargo inside. The plaintiffs argued that the crew could have saved the ship but failed to do so. The court ruled that failure to extinguish a fire, even if negligent, does not constitute barratry. Fire was ruled the cause of the cargo's destruction, not barratry, and the insurance company was required to pay.

National Union Fire Insurance Co. v. Republic of China et al. considered how the law of barratry applies during periods of civil war and insurrection. In the 1940s, the U.S. had sold 13 ships to the Nationalist government of the Republic of China. In 1949, during the Chinese Civil War, the communist People's Republic of China took control of Mainland China and forced the Nationalist government to flee to Taiwan. Six of the ships were at ports in Mainland China, and a seventh was at sea. The Republic of China ordered all seven ships to set sail for Taiwan, but none of them complied since they chose instead to turn themselves over to the communist People's Republic of China. Although the Republic of China's insurance policy excluded losses from civil war, insurrection, or mutiny, it covered barratry. The court ruled that the ships had been lost to barratry, not mutiny, since the captains themselves had ordered their crews to hoist the flag of Communist China.

== Penalties ==
Until 1888, barratry was a capital offense in the United States. Juries routinely refused to convict people of the crime, even if their guilt was obvious, because they did not agree with the death penalty for barratry. That came to a head with the destruction of Mary Celeste in 1885. Mary Celeste had become infamous after being discovered adrift in 1872, in good condition, with no one on board. In 1885, her final owner, Captain G. C. Parker, was accused of barratry for deliberately running her aground and burning her off the coast of Haiti and then making an exorbitant insurance claim for a nonexistent cargo. Despite the obvious attempt at insurance fraud and clear evidence of his guilt, five of the twelve jurors refused to convict Parker to avoid condemning him to death. The death penalty for barratry was abolished three years later.

== Barratry in fiction ==
- In Tom Clancy's 1984 novel The Hunt for Red October, the character Admiral Foster remarks that the apparent theft of the eponymous Soviet submarine Red October by Captain Marko Ramius and his officers with the intention of defecting with the submarine to the United States, constitutes barratry, and not mutiny.
- In the 1964 movie The Chalk Garden actress Hayley Mills says to a potential governess, “Maitland (the butler, played by her father, the actor John Mills) could [burn the house down one day], but he won't. He's a pyromaniac himself. Did seven years for barratry ...arson at sea".
