= Barbed Wire Sunday =

Name given to the day when the construction of the Berlin Wall began (13 August 1961)

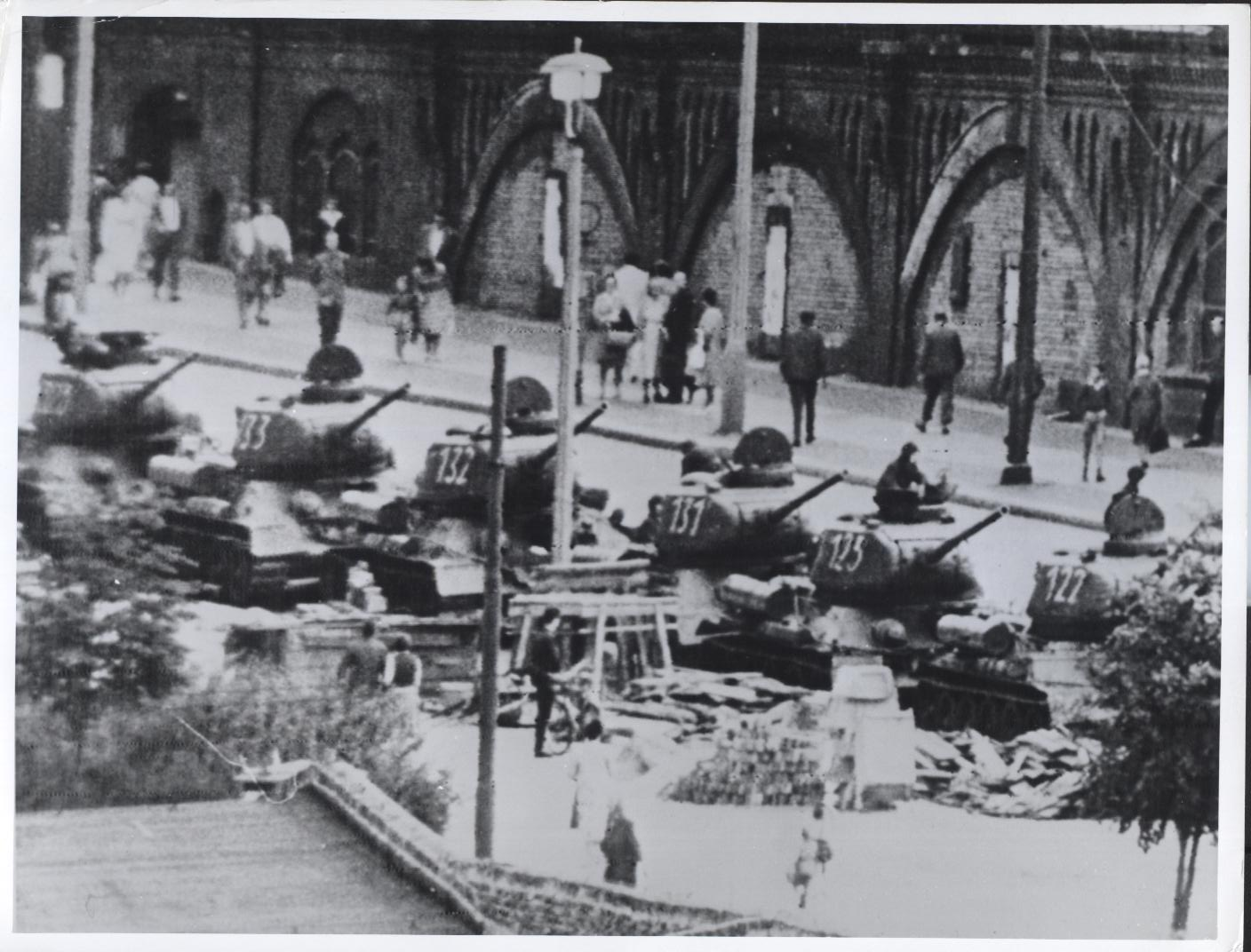
East German tanks stretch out along the Warschauer bridge/Oberbaum Bridge in Berlin to stem the flow of refugees to the West, 13 August 1961

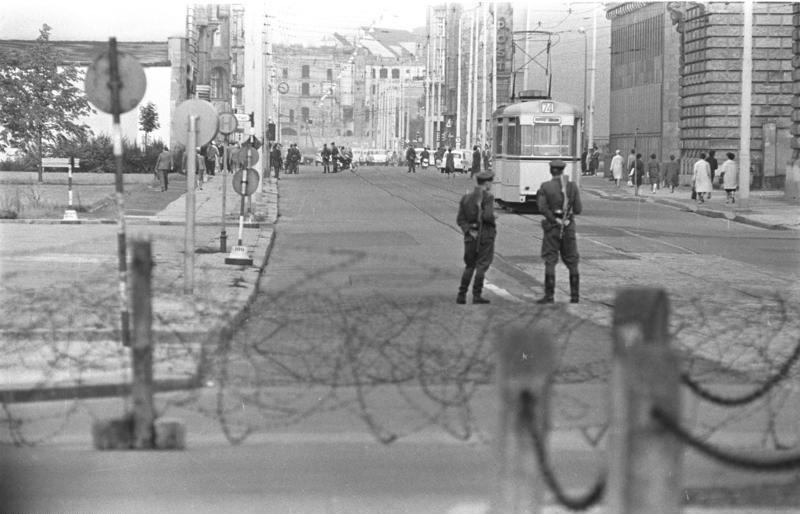
Leipziger Straße, August 1961

Barbed Wire Sunday (German: Stacheldrahtsonntag), is the name given to 13 August 1961, when the military and police of East Germany closed the border between East and West Berlin and began the construction of what would become the Berlin Wall. The intention of closing the border was to prevent the migration of East Germans to the West.

Prior to the establishment of the wall, approximately 3.5 million (or 20% of the population) East German citizens defected to West Germany, many through the Berlin border due to its lack of security. This posed a major issue to the government as it was losing its substantial amounts of not just its workforce but also its intellectuals.

== Timeline ==
Beginning at midnight, Walter Ulbricht directed the beginning of construction. Under extreme secrecy, East German troops arrived at certain points to unload concrete, barbed wire, shovels, stone blocks and more. Stasi agents were stationed throughout major intersections between the Soviet and Western sectors of Germany.

Around 4 a.m., radio reports of commotion in the streets were being broadcast in West Berlin. By 4 p.m., half a million Berliners from both the West and East congregated around the sector. While police in West Berlin held back West Berliners who were calling for action, police in East Berlin were keeping its people away from the construction.

== Results ==
Despite the measures imposed, 800 people managed to escape East Berlin before the end of the day. They had to overcome barbed wire or jump through house windows at the sector border to succeed. However, only a few dozen managed to escape the following day. The Berlin Wall had officially been established.

Football players Emil Poklitar and Rolf Starost from SC Dynamo Berlin defected to West Berlin during a friendly match against Boldklubben af 1893 in Copenhagen on 13 August 1961. Emil Poklitar had gotten wind that the authorities were going to build the Berlin Wall and was helped by his teammates in SC Dynamo Berlin to escape the Stasi supervisors.
