= Eugenija Pleškytė =

Lithuanian actress

- Born: 6 January 1938; Giliogiris, Lithuania
- Died: 3 November 2012 (aged 74); Klaipėda, Lithuania
- Occupation: Actress
- Relatives: Jonas Pleškys (brother)

Eugenija Pleškytė (6 January 1938 – 3 November 2012) was a Lithuanian actress.

In 2009, she was awarded the Golden Crane award by the Lithuanian Film Academy for her contributions to Lithuanian cinema.

== Filmography ==
- 1970 - It Was in May
- 1972 - Northern Crusades
