= Jerzy Lewi =

Polish chess player

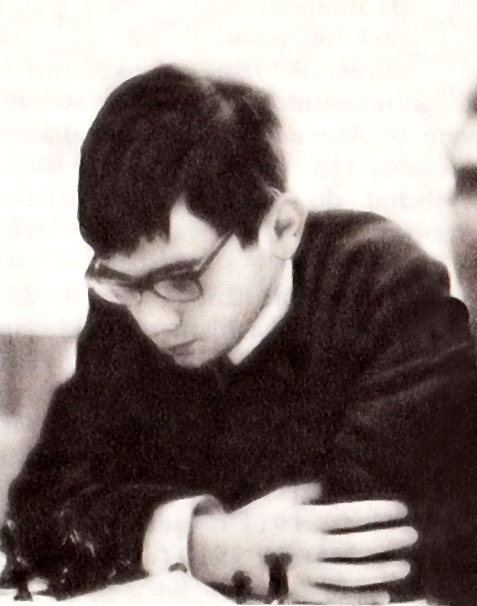
Jerzy Lewi

Jerzy Lewi (22 April 1949, Wrocław – 30 October 1972, Lund) was a Polish chess master.

He won five-times Polish Junior championships in 1965–1969. He took 3rd, behind Anatoly Karpov and Andras Adorjan, at Groningen 1967 (European Junior Championship). In 1968, he tied for 2nd-5th in Łódź (25th Polish Championship). In 1969, he won in Lublin (26th POL-ch). He took 12th at Athens 1969 (zonal; Milan Matulović won), and had decided to stay in the West. As a refugee, because of the 1968 Polish political crisis, he lived in Sweden where he died in a traffic accident in Lund. He was buried in a Jewish cemetery in Malmö.

== See also ==
- List of Eastern Bloc defectors
