= Soviet frigate Storozhevoy =

Krivak-class frigate

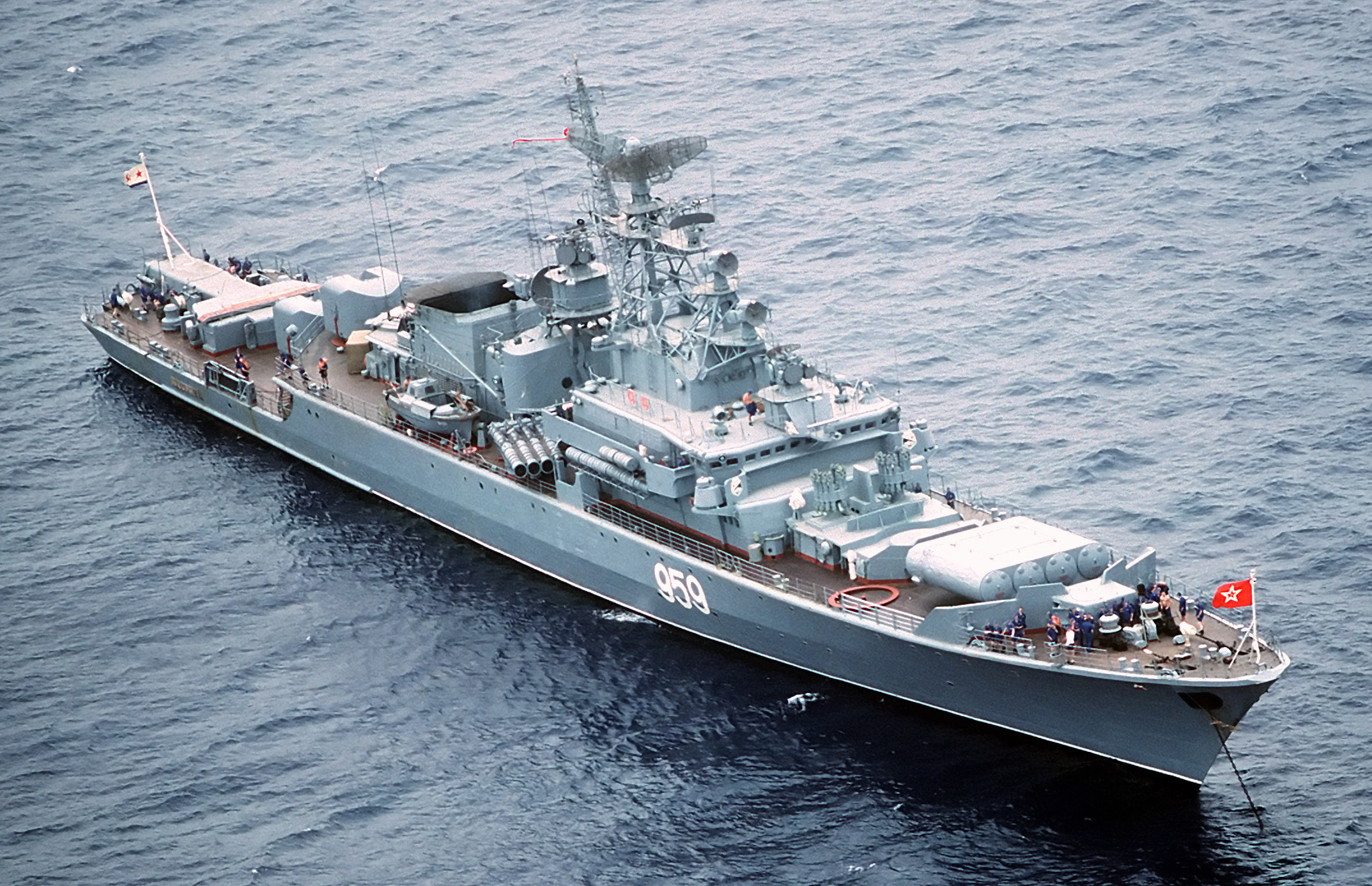
- A Burevestnik (Krivak I)-class frigate Zadorniy at anchor. Storozhevoy would have looked identical in most respects to the vessel pictured here.

History

Soviet Union → Russia
- Name: Storozhevoy
- Namesake: Russian for "Protective" or "Vigilant"
- Builder: Yantar Shipyard, Kaliningrad
- Yard number: 155
- Laid down: 20 July 1972
- Launched: 21 March 1973
- Commissioned: 30 December 1973
- Decommissioned: June 2002
- Fate: Sold for scrap

General characteristics
- Class & type: Project 1135 Burevestnik frigate
- Displacement: 3,300 tons standard, 3,575 tons full load
- Length: 405.3 ft (123.5 m)
- Beam: 46.3 ft (14.1 m)
- Draught: 15.1 ft (4.6 m)
- Propulsion: 2 shaft; COGAG; 2x M-8k gas-turbines, 40,000 shp; 2x M-62 gas-turbines (cruise), 14,950 shp
- Speed: 32 knots (59 km/h)
- Range: 4,995 nmi (9,251 km) at 14 knots (26 km/h)
- Complement: 200
- Armament: 1× 4 SS-N-14 'Silex' ASW missiles; 2× SA-N-4 'Gecko' SAM (40 missiles); 4× 76 mm guns (2×2); 2 × RBU-6000 Anti-Submarine rockets; 2× 4 533 mm torpedo tubes
- Notes: (General class characteristics)

Storozhevoy (Russian: Сторожевой, lit. 'guardian' or 'sentry') was a Soviet Navy Project 1135 Burevestnik-class anti-submarine frigate (NATO reporting name Krivak I). After commissioning, the Soviet Navy assigned the ship to its Baltic Fleet and based it in Baltiysk. Storozhevoy was involved in a barratry led by Valery Sablin in November 1975, after which it was assigned to the Pacific Fleet for the remainder of its career. It was decommissioned in June 2002.

== Construction ==
Storozhevoy was laid down on 20 July 1972 with yard number 155 at the Yantar Shipyard in Kaliningrad. The ship was launched on 21 March 1973 and was commissioned on 30 December 1973. The frigate was then assigned to the Baltic Fleet.

== Barratry ==
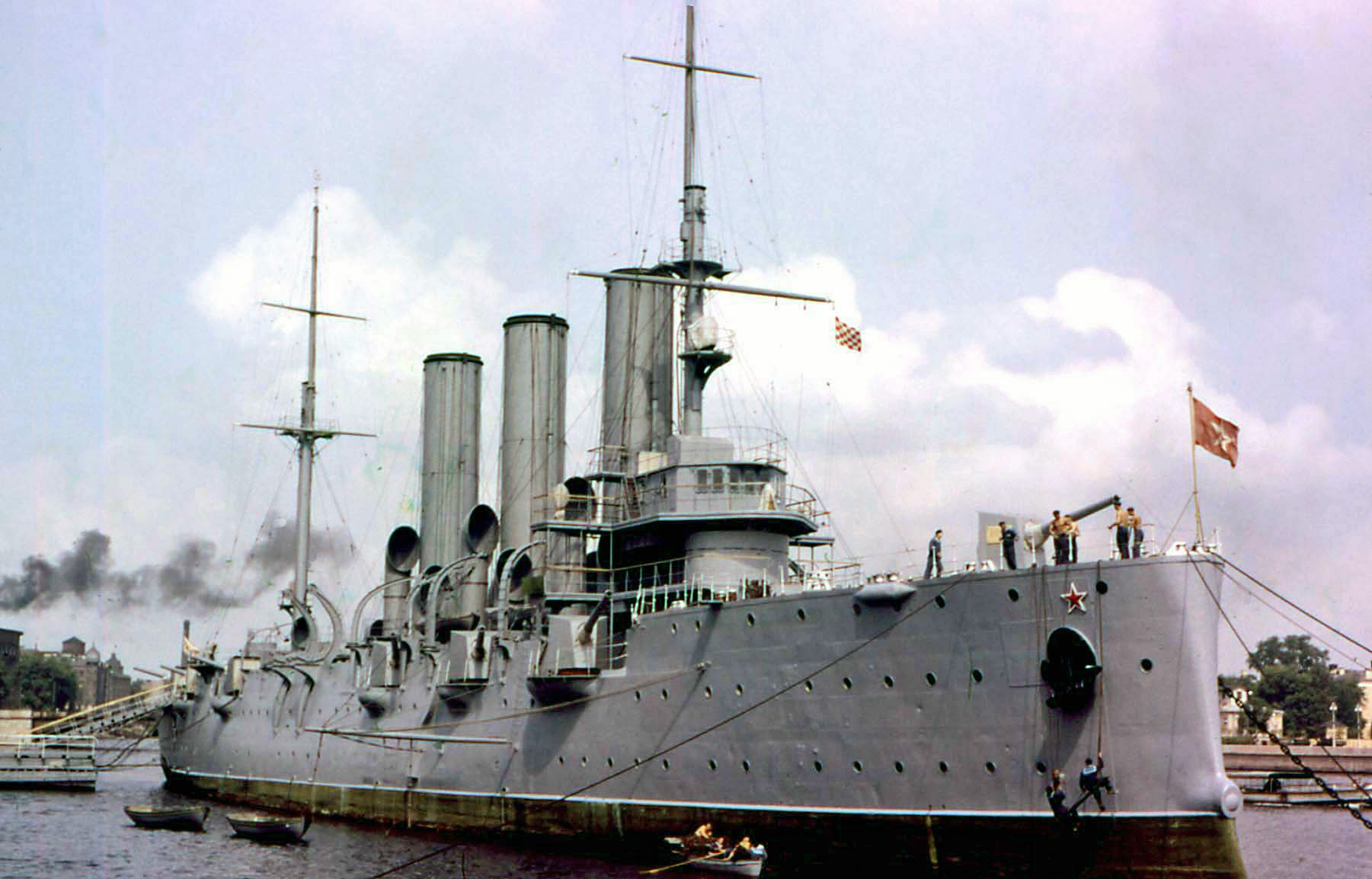
The Aurora, pictured in 1961, is a symbol of the Russian Revolution.

The barratry was led by the ship's political commissar, Captain of the Third Rank Valery Sablin, who wished to protest against the rampant corruption of the Leonid Brezhnev era. His aim was to seize the ship and steer it out of the Bay of Riga, to Leningrad through the Neva River, moor alongside the museum ship Aurora, an old symbol of the Russian revolution, and broadcast a nationwide address to the people from there. In that address, he was going to say what he believed people publicly wanted to say, but could only be said in private: that socialism and the motherland were in danger; the ruling authorities were up to their necks in corruption, demagoguery, graft, and lies, leading the country into an abyss; communism had been discarded, and there was a need to revive the Leninist principles of justice.

On the evening of 9 November 1975, Sablin lured the captain to the lower deck, claiming that there were some officers who needed to be disciplined for being drunk on duty. When the captain arrived at the lower deck, a fist fight ensued in which Sablin detained the captain and the other officers in the forward sonar compartment and seized control of the ship. Sablin then summoned a meeting of all the senior officers on the ship. Here a vote was taken amongst the fifteen officers present. Sablin informed the officers that he planned to steam to Leningrad and broadcast his revolutionary message. Eight officers voted in favor of the barratry; the remaining seven senior members of the ship's crew who did not wish to go along with the plan were brutally beaten and locked in a separate compartment below the main deck.

Sablin then moved on to the next phase of the plan, which was to win the support of the seamen, numbering about 145-155 men. Sablin was a popular officer and he used this to his advantage. He assembled the crew and delivered a speech which instantly had all the seamen motivated and excited about a revolution.

One of the officers who had voted in favor of the barratry had escaped under the cover of night and had run across the naval dock to raise the alarm; however, the guard at the gate did not believe him. Both the officer and guard were later brutally beaten, arrested, imprisoned, starved, tortured and interrogated by the KGB.

On discovering that they might soon be detected, Sablin decided to set sail immediately, rather than wait till the morning and leave with the rest of the fleet, as originally planned. The crew immediately set sail under the cover of dark and made their way out of Riga. Sablin also ensured that the radar was off to avoid detection from Soviet forces.

When Soviet authorities learned of the barratry, the Kremlin ordered that control must be regained, fearing Sablin might follow in Jonas Pleškys' footsteps to ask political asylum in Sweden. Half the Baltic fleet, including thirteen naval vessels, were sent in pursuit and were joined by 60 warplanes (including three Yak-28 bombers, this being the only instance of a Yak-28 firing in anger), which dropped 250 kg bombs in the vicinity of the rebel ship. The aircraft also strafed Storozhevoy repeatedly. The ship's steering was damaged and she stopped dead on the water 32 kilometres (20 mi) from Swedish territorial waters and 530 kilometres (330 mi) from Kronstadt. After warning shots from the closing loyal warships, the frigate was eventually boarded by Soviet marine commandos. By then, Sablin had been non-fatally shot in his leg and detained by members of his own crew, who also unlocked the captive captain and officers. All of the complement from Storozhevoy, including the captain, were brutally beaten, arrested, starved, tortured and interrogated by the KGB. But only Sablin and his second-in-command, Alexander Shein, a 20-year-old seaman, were tried and convicted. The ship's crew was then changed completely.

At his trial in July 1976, Sablin was convicted of high treason and was executed by firing squad on 3 August 1976, while Shein was sentenced to prison and was released after serving eight years. The rest of the mutineers were set free, but dishonorably discharged from the Soviet Navy.

== Aftermath ==
Storozhevoy was officially transferred to the Pacific Fleet on 10 November 1975. The frigate departed Baltiysk in early 1976, sailing through Suez Canal and later arrived in Petropavlovsk-Kamchatsky, Soviet Far East. On 10–15 September 1980, the ship made a call to the port of Massawa, at the time part of Ethiopia.

The ship underwent routine maintenance at Dalzavod Shipyard in Vladivostok from 21 April 1987 to 14 November 1994. Storozhevoy was decommissioned in June 2002 and later sold to India for scrap.

== In literature ==
Gregory D. Young was the first Westerner to investigate the mutiny as part of his 1982 master's thesis Mutiny on Storozhevoy: A Case Study of Dissent in the Soviet Navy. One of 37 copies of Young's thesis was placed in the Nimitz Library of the United States Naval Academy where it was read by Tom Clancy, then an insurance salesman, who used it as inspiration to write The Hunt for Red October. That novel was turned into a 1990 film under the same name. Portions of Young's thesis were published in the naval magazine Sea Power in 1985 and in 2005, in the book The Last Sentry, by Young and Nate Braden.
