= List of Eastern Bloc defectors =

Soon after the formation of the Soviet Union, emigration restrictions were put in place to keep citizens from leaving the various republics of the USSR, though some defections still occurred. During and after World War II, similar restrictions were put in place in non-Soviet countries of the Eastern Bloc, which consisted of the communist states of Central and Eastern Europe (except for non-aligned Yugoslavia).

Until 1952, however, the Inner German border between East and West Germany could be easily crossed in most places. Accordingly, before 1961, most of that east–west flow took place between East and West Germany, with over 3.5 million East Germans emigrating to West Germany before 1961. On August 13, 1961, a barbed-wire barrier, which would become the Berlin Wall separating East and West Berlin, was erected by East Germany.

Although international movement was, for the most part, strictly controlled, there was a steady loss through escapees who were able to use ingenious methods to evade frontier security. Numerous notable Eastern Bloc citizens defected to non-Eastern Bloc countries.

The following list of Eastern Bloc defectors contains notable defectors from East Germany, the Soviet Union, Poland, Bulgaria, Romania, Czechoslovakia, Hungary, and Albania before those countries' conversions from communist states in the late 1980s and early 1990s.

== List of defections ==
Defections violating emigration restrictions of the Eastern Bloc countries
Defector	Profession/ Prominence	Birthplace	Year	Notes
George Balanchine	Choreographer	Russia	1924	Defected during a tour of Germany to the Weimar Republic
Boris Bazhanov	Politburo secretary	Ukraine, Russian Empire	1928	Defected to France via Iran and India
Georges Agabekov	OGPU	Turkmenistan	1930	Defected in France; led the manhunt for Boris Bazhanov before defecting
Grigol Robakidze	Author	Georgia	1930	Defected to Germany; primarily known for his exotic prose and anti-Soviet émigré activities
Tatiana Tchernavin	Writer	Russia	1932	Fled from the USSR with her husband Vladimir V. Tchernavin and her son Andrei through Karelia to Finland and then to the United Kingdom. She and her son visited her husband in a gulag prison, before fleeing together. She wrote a book about their experience: Escape from the Soviets and her husband wrote another: I Speak For the Silent Prisoners of the Soviets.
George Gamow	Physicist	Ukraine	1933	First tried to kayak across the Black Sea; defected in Brussels, Belgium; later discovered alpha decay via quantum tunneling
Ignace Reiss	NKVD	Austria-Hungary	1937	Former spy of Soviet intelligence services; assassinated by the NKVD
Walter Krivitsky	NKVD	Austria-Hungary	1937	Defected in Paris after the assassination of Reiss; apparent suicide in the United States in 1941 may have been an NKVD assassination
Alexander Orlov	NKVD	Belarus	1938	Fled while stationed in Spain to avoid execution in the Great Purge
Genrikh Lyushkov	NKVD	Ukraine, Russian Empire	1938	Crossed the border into Manchukuo with secret documents; family arrested and sent to the gulag, where several died
Aron Sheinman	Director of the London department of Intourist	Poland, Russian Empire	1939	Was recalled from London, refused to return to the USSR
Michael 'Tarzan' Fomenko (aged 2)	Naturalised Australian bushman and ocean rower	Georgia	1930s	Defected with his parents and sister to Australia via Vladivostok, Manchuria, Siberia and Japan
Abdurakhman Avtorkhanov	Author	Russia	1942	Sent to infiltrate anti-Soviet Chechens; he joined them instead
Nasreddin Murat-Khan	Architect/engineer	Russia	1944	Fled to evade religious persecution. Defected in Berlin, Germany; then to Pakistan in 1950 where he was given refuge and citizenship. In honour of his new home, Pakistan; he designed and constructed the Minar-e-Pakistan in Lahore, which stands as a national symbol of the country to this day. He also constructed the Gaddafi Stadium, Lahore and Nishtar Medical University in Multan.
Victor Kravchenko	Engineer	Ukraine	1944	Soviet engineer who witnessed the horrors of the Holodomor; defected while serving in the Soviet Purchasing Agency in Washington, D.C., in the U.S.
G. M. Dimitrov	Politician	Bulgaria	1945	Saved from execution by the U.S. ambassador; later founded anti-communist organisations
Fedir Bohatyrchuk	Chess player, medical doctor	USSR	1945	Former Soviet chess champion who eventually immigrated to Canada, where he became a professor of medicine and resumed his competitive chess
Géza Füster	Chess player	Hungary	1945	Defected through East Berlin with friend Pal Benko who was caught and jailed for three years
Igor Gouzenko	GRU	Russia	1945	Defected in Ottawa, Canada; helped uncover communist spy rings
Konstantin Volkov	NKVD	Russia	1945	Deputy head of the NKVD in Istanbul, Turkey; contacted the British consulate about defection, was arrested by the Soviets, and disappeared forever (possibly executed)
Valeri Tihonovitch Minakov		Russia	1945	Escaped from Siberia across the Bering Sea in a small boat with his 6-year-old son Oleg. He was assisted by Yupik of Savoonga and Gambell on St. Lawrence Island. Shortly afterward, 14 Siberians arrived for "a visit" and questioned inhabitants whether they had seen a "white Russian".
Anatoli Granovsky	MGB agent	Ukraine, Russian Empire	1946	Defected in Stockholm, Sweden and later wrote an autobiography
Grigori Tokaty	Scientist and politician	Ossetia	1947	Secretly worked with an underground opposition group in the USSR. Afraid that his ties to the underground would be discovered, he defected to the British Sector of Occupied Berlin, and arrived in the UK in 1947. He later worked in the Information Research Department, helping disseminate anti-communist propaganda.
Jan Čep	Writer	Czechoslovakia	1948	Defected to France; poet friend who stayed behind was jailed for 13 years for "anti-socialist thinking"
Nesti Josifi Kopali	Chief of the Sigurimi Albanian security service in Rome	Albania	1949	Offered himself to the U.S. Embassy in Rome in late 1949, but was rejected, so he turned to Italian intelligence. After a couple of months of interrogation, he was turned over to the CIA, which flew him to Washington, D.C., for debriefing. Kopali had, among his other anti-western assignments in 1946–47, tried and failed to set up a liaison with the editor of an ethnic newspaper in Boston. In 1950, Kopali provided some valuable information about Albanian security and military matters, but not enough for the U.S. government to offer him political asylum and resettlement in the U.S. He was ultimately flown back to Germany.
Alena Vrzáňová	Figure skater	Czechoslovakia	1950	Defected during the 1950 World Championships in London
Josef Buršík	General	Czechoslovakia	1950	Escaped from prison to West Germany and later the UK. After the Warsaw Pact invasion of Czechoslovakia in 1968, Buršík returned his Hero of the Soviet Union medal to the Soviet embassy in London.
Czesław Miłosz	Author	Poland	1951	Defected to France after serving as a Polish diplomat and later settled in the U.S.
Istvan Rabovsky	Dancer	Hungary	1953	Escaped with wife Nora Kovach to West Berlin on an East Berlin tour
Franciszek Jarecki	Pilot	Poland	1953	Flew a MiG-15 from Słupsk, Poland to Rønne Airport on the Danish island of Bornholm
Józef Światło	UB, lieutenant colonel	Poland	1953	Defected on a mission in East Berlin; he went on to reveal in Radio Free Europe broadcasts the internal struggle in the Polish United Workers' Party (PZPR) and the true face of the Security Office (UB). One result of his escape was the liquidation of the Ministry of Security (MBP).
Nikolai Khokhlov	KGB	Russia	1953	Refused to assassinate George Okolovich; defected in West Germany and survived a KGB assassination attempt in 1957
Nora Kovach	Dancer	Hungary	1953	Escaped with husband Istvan Rabovsky to West Berlin on an East Berlin tour
Andrzej Panufnik	Composer	Poland	1954	Escaped Polish secret police in a nighttime taxi chase in Zurich, Switzerland, then defected to the UK while in London
Peter Deriabin	KGB Colonel	Russia	1954	KGB Colonel and personnel officer who contacted U.S. intelligence in Vienna and was exfiltrated through the "Mozart Express" military train; worked with the CIA for years afterwards
Vladimir Petrov	Diplomat	Russia	1954	Husband of undercover KGB agent Evdokia Petrova; defected on a mission in Australia which sparked the Petrov Affair
Evdokia Petrova	KGB agent	Russia	1954	Undercover KGB agent who was the wife of Vladimir Petrov; defected in Australia during the Petrov Affair
Béla Berger	Chess player	Hungary	1956	Defected during the Hungarian Revolution of 1956 to Australia
Ferenc Puskás	Football player	Hungary	1956	Defected during the 1956–57 European Cup in Madrid, Spain
Imre Lakatos	Philosopher of science	Hungary	1956	Fled to Vienna, Austria, and later to the UK after the Hungarian Revolution of 1956
Jenő Kalmár	Football player	Hungary	1956	Defected during the 1956–57 European Cup in Madrid, Spain, then went to Switzerland
József Mindszenty	Cardinal	Hungary	1956	Fled to the U.S. Embassy in Budapest during the Hungarian Revolution of 1956; later moved to Austria
Sándor Kocsis	Football player	Hungary	1956	Defected during the 1956–57 European Cup in Madrid, Spain, then went to Switzerland
Zoltán Czibor	Football player	Hungary	1956	Fled to Spain during the Hungarian Revolution of 1956
Ágnes Keleti	Artistic gymnast	Hungary	1956	Defected in Melbourne, Australia, during the 1956 Summer Olympics
Christo Javacheff	Environmental artist	Bulgaria	1957	Escaped from Czechoslovakia to Austria
Reino Häyhänen	KGB agent	Russia	1957	Defected in Paris after spending several years spying undercover in the west
Pal Benko	Chess player	Hungary	1957	Defected in Reykjavik following the World Student Team Championship
Nicholas Shadrin	Naval officer	Russia	1959	Defected in Sweden; later allegedly killed by the KGB
Alexander Petrovich	Photographer	Russia	1960	Defected through Iran and India; settled in the U.S. in Tampa, Florida
Ernst Degner	Motorcycle racer	East Germany	1961	Defected once he knew that his wife and two children had already escaped to West Germany in a car trunk. Degner, who was familiar with MZ Motorcycles' loop scavenging technique secrets, drove his car from the Swedish Grand Prix to Denmark, then on to West Germany.
Michael Goleniewski	SB MSW	Poland	1961	Defected in West Germany; sentenced to death after defection; subsequently worked for the CIA. Before he defected, he had spied for the CIA under the cover name Sniper, but the CIA did not know his identity until his escape.
Anatoliy Golitsyn	KGB agent	Ukraine	1961	Defected to the U.S. from Helsinki, Finland via Sweden and West Germany with his wife and daughter when he was stationed in Helsinki; made sensational claims after his defection
Rudolf Nureyev	Ballet dancer	Russia	1961	Defected while on tour in Paris
Jonas Pleškys	Submarine tender captain	Lithuania	1961	Sailed vessel to Sweden; sentenced to death and hidden by the CIA from the USSR
Valentin Poénaru	Mathematician	Romania	1961	Defected at a conference in Stockholm, Sweden; known for low-dimensional topology
Emil Poklitar	Football player	East Germany	1961	Football player of SC Dynamo Berlin. Defected together with teammate Rolf Starost after a friendly match against Boldklubben af 1893 in Copenhagen, Denmark
Rolf Starost	Football player	East Germany	1961	Football player of SC Dynamo Berlin. Defected together with Emil Poklitar after a friendly match against Boldklubben af 1893 in Copenhagen, Denmark
Konrad Schumann	Border guard	East Germany	1961	Photographed jumping the Berlin Wall during construction
Bohdan Stashynsky	KGB agent	Ukraine	1961	Defected in West Berlin; assassinated Lev Rebet and Stepan Bandera before his defection
Petr Beckmann	Physicist	Czechoslovakia	1963	Defected as a visiting professor to the University of Colorado in the U.S.; became a proponent of libertarianism and nuclear energy
Yuri Krotkov	KGB agent	Georgia	1963	Defected while an undercover agent in London; later became a novelist
Gabor Balla	Marksman	Hungary	1964	Defected in Tokyo, Japan during the 1964 Summer Olympics
András Törő	Flatwater canoe athlete	Hungary	1964	Defected in Tokyo, Japan during the 1964 Summer Olympics
Paul Barbă Neagră	Film director	Romania	1964	Defected in Tours, France
Yuri Nosenko	KGB agent	Ukraine	1964	Defected in Washington, D.C., United States; for years, the CIA believed that he might be a double agent
Michael Polywka	Football player	East Germany	1966	Fled after a match in Sweden; traveled to West Germany
Ivan Diviš	Poet	Czechoslovakia	1967	Fled after the Prague Spring to West Germany and worked for Radio Free Europe
Svetlana Alliluyeva	Joseph Stalin's daughter	Russia	1967	Defected to the U.S. via New Delhi, India; denounced the former regime of her late father Joseph Stalin, but softened her criticism of him in the 1980s
Anatoly Kuznetsov	Author	Ukraine	1968	Defected after the Warsaw Pact invasion of Czechoslovakia while doing research in London to the UK
Jan Šejna	General	Czechoslovakia	1968	Fled after the Prague Spring to the U.S.
Miloš Forman	Film director and actor	Czechoslovakia	1968	Defected to the U.S. when the USSR and its Warsaw Pact allies invaded the country to end the Prague Spring; known for directing One Flew Over the Cuckoo's Nest and Amadeus
Vladimir Oravsky	Writer	Czechoslovakia	1968	Fled after the Prague Spring to Sweden
Cornel Chiriac	Journalist	Romania	1969	Defected to Austria using a fake invitation
Georgi Markov	Playwright	Bulgaria	1969	Fled to Italy after a ban on plays; assassinated in London in 1978
Jerzy Lewi	Chess player	Poland	1969	Defected during a tournament in Athens, Greece; traveled to Sweden
Ladislav Bittman	Czechoslovak state security, disinformation	Czechoslovakia	1969	Became a professor at Boston University, lecturing on disinformation and propaganda
Josef Frolík	Czechoslovak state security	Czechoslovakia	1969	Defected from Bulgaria to Turkey on a boat, moved by the CIA to the U.S.
Simonas Kudirka	Seaman	Lithuania	1970	Leaped from a Soviet ship to a U.S. Coast Guard ship
Natalia Makarova	Ballet dancer	Russia	1970	Defected while on a ballet tour in London; later won a Tony Award
Yuri Bezmenov	KGB propaganda agent	Russia	1970	Left his KGB station in India disguised as a hippie, traveled to Greece, was debriefed in the U.S., but refused to stay in the country because of KGB infiltration of the CIA; later granted asylum in Canada
Oleg Lyalin	KGB agent	Russia	1971	Defected in London after being arrested there; exposed dozens of KGB agents in the city
Vasek Matousek	Figure skater	Czechoslovakia	1972	
Ioan P. Culianu	Philosopher	Romania	1972	Defected during lectures in Italy. He was murdered on the campus of University of Chicago in 1991, and speculation arose that it was at the hands of former Securitate personnel.
Alexander Elder	Author	Russia	1974	Jumped from a Soviet ship, on which he was working as a doctor, while it was off the Ivory Coast; later traveled to the U.S.
Mikhail Baryshnikov	Ballet dancer	Latvia	1974	Defected during a tour in Toronto, Canada
Paul Nevai	Mathematician	Hungary	1974	Defected in Paris; emigrated to the U.S. in 1976
Stanislav Kurilov	Oceanographer	USSR	1974	While on a "cruise to nowhere" in the open ocean, jumped into the sea and swam to the Philippine coast, many kilometres away
Václav Nedomanský	Hockey player	Czechoslovakia	1974	Defected during a vacation in Switzerland
Martina Navratilova	Tennis player	Czechoslovakia	1975	Defected at the 1975 US Open in the U.S.
Leslie Mándoki	Musician	Hungary	1975	Fled into Yugoslavia and then into Austria via railway tunnel
Gábor Csupó	Animator	Hungary	1975	Fled into Yugoslavia and then into Austria via railway tunnel
Jürgen Pahl	Football player	East Germany	1976	Fled with Norbert Nachtweih after an under-21 match in Turkey; traveled to West Germany
Norbert Nachtweih	Football player	East Germany	1976	Fled with Jürgen Pahl after an under-21 match in Turkey; traveled to West Germany
Viktor Belenko	Fighter pilot	Russia	1976	Flew a MiG-25 from Chuguyevka, Russia to Hakodate, Japan
Viktor Korchnoi	Chess player	Russia	1976	First Soviet Grandmaster to defect; fled following a tournament in Amsterdam, Netherlands
Youri Egorov	Pianist	Russia	1976	Fled during a tour in Rome, Italy
Vladimir Rezun (Viktor Suvorov)	GRU	Russia	1978	GRU military intelligence officer who defected to the UK while working under UN cover in Switzerland
Arkady Shevchenko	UN Undersecretary General	Ukraine	1978	Spied for the U.S. for three years before defection. His wife in Moscow died two months after his defection, purportedly of suicide.
Kirill Kondrashin	Conductor	Russia	1978	Defected in December 1978 while touring in the Netherlands and sought political asylum there
Ion Mihai Pacepa	Securitate agent	Romania	1978	Two-star Romanian Securitate general and personal advisor to Nicolae Ceauşescu; defected in U.S. Embassy in Bonn, West Germany; sentenced to death twice in absentia with a $2 million bounty. Carlos the Jackal was sent to assassinate him.
Matei Pavel Haiducu	Securitate agent	Romania	1978	Defected to France in 1981 while on an industrial espionage mission; sentenced to death in absentia
Imants Lešinskis	KGB agent	Latvia	1978	Defected to the U.S. while working at the UN
Alexander Godunov	Ballet dancer	Russia	1979	Defected while on a ballet tour in New York City at JFK International Airport in Queens; later became an actor, playing among other roles as a terrorist in Die Hard
Werner Stiller	Stasi agent	East Germany	1979	Defected to West Germany after stealing state secrets
Jörg Berger	Football coach	East Germany	1979	Used a match with the East German youth national football team in Yugoslavia to flee to West Germany
Leonid Kozlov	Ballet dancer	Russia	1979	Defected with wife Valentina Kozlova during their company's tour in Los Angeles, California
Valentina Kozlova	Ballet dancer	Russia	1979	Defected with husband Leonid Kozlov during their company's tour in Los Angeles, California
Lev Alburt	Chess player	Russia	1979	Soviet chess grandmaster; defected to the U.S. where he won the US Chess Championship three times
Ludmila Belousova	Figure skater	Russia	1979	Defected while in Switzerland
Lutz Eigendorf	Football player	East Germany	1979	Football player of BFC Dynamo. Fled during a match in West Germany; died in a car accident in 1983, allegedly assassinated by the Stasi
Oleg Protopopov	Figure skater	Russia	1979	Defected with Ludmila Belousova while on tour in Switzerland
Stanislav Levchenko	KGB agent	Russia	1979	Defected during a mission in Tokyo, Japan; detailed the KGB's Japanese spy network
Vladas Česiūnas	Sprint canoe athlete	Lithuania	1979	Defected during the world championships at Frankfurt Airport in West Germany; recaptured by the KGB
Anton Šťastný	Hockey player	Czechoslovakia	1980	Defected with brother Peter during the European Cup tournament in Innsbruck, Austria
Igor Vasilyevich Ivanov	Chess player	Russia	1980	Ran from KGB agents when his plane made an emergency stop in Gander, Canada
Peter Šťastný	Hockey player	Czechoslovakia	1980	Defected with his wife and brother Anton during the European Cup tournament in Innsbruck, Austria
Sulamith Messerer	Ballet dancer	Russia	1980	Sister's husband purged; defected to the UK at the age of 72 to coach ballet
Walter Polovchak	Underage defector	Ukraine	1980	Fled from his parents when they were about to return to the Ukrainian SSR. Granted political asylum as a naturalised U.S. citizen upon turning 18 on October 3, 1985. Had been the subject of a lengthy political cause célèbre during the preceding five years
Maxim Shostakovich	Conductor	Russia	1981	Defected while on tour in West Germany with his son
Romuald Spasowski	Ambassador	Poland	1981	Defected when martial law was declared in Poland in 1981
Zdzisław Rurarz	Ambassador	Poland	1981	Defected to the U.S. Embassy in Tokyo with Spasowski following the Polish United Workers' Party's declaration of martial law
Ryszard Kukliński	Colonel	Poland	1981	Spied for the U.S. for 10 years after the 1970 massacre of Polish workers. Later defected to the U.S. and was sentenced to death in absentia. Died of a stroke; sentence annulled in 1998 by the Polish Supreme Court
Vladimir Tismăneanu	Political scientist	Romania	1981	Defected in Spain while on an authorised trip with his mother to visit the site of his father's battles
Miroslav Fryčer	Hockey player	Czechoslovakia	1981	Defected to Canada while at a tournament with the Czechoslovakia men's national ice hockey team in Bern, Switzerland
Clifford Kettemborough	Mathematician, computer scientist	Romania	1982	Defected to Turkey, then Austria, via Bulgaria before emigrating to the U.S. in June 1983
Vladimir Kuzichkin	KGB agent	Russia	1982	Defected to a British intelligence station in Tehran and then to the UK
Gega Kobakhidze	Actor	Georgia	1983	Hijacked Aeroflot Flight 6833; tried to defect to Turkey and was arrested
Falko Götz	Football player	East Germany	1983	Football player of BFC Dynamo. Fled before a match in Yugoslavia together with teammate Dirk Schlegel; traveled to West Germany
Dirk Schlegel	Football player	East Germany	1983	Football player of BFC Dynamo. Fled before a match in Yugoslavia together with Falko Götz; traveled to West Germany
Vakhtang Jordania	Conductor	Georgia	1983	Defected while on tour with Viktoria Mullova via Kuusamo, Finland and Haparanda, Sweden, to the U.S.
Viktoria Mullova	Violinist	Russia	1983	Defected in a tour with Vakhtang Jordania via Kuusamo, Finland, and Haparanda, Sweden, to the U.S.
Oleg Bitov	Editor	Russia	1983	Foreign editor of Literaturnaya Gazeta; defected in Venice, Italy, to the UK
Dariusz Janczewski	Track and field athlete	Poland	1984	Left a hotel room in the middle of the night while in Turin, Italy, at an international track meet; spent several months in a refugee camp in Italy before relocating to the U.S.
Vasily Matuzok	Diplomatic translator	Russia	1984	Translator at the Soviet embassy in Pyongyang, North Korea. Defected during a guided tour of the Korean Joint Security Area by running across the demarcation line to South Korea
Valdo Randpere	Deputy Minister of Justice	Estonia	1984	Defected via Kotka, Finland to Sweden; fled during a Soviet crackdown on Estonian nationalism
Ivo Zdarsky	Aviation engineering student	Czechoslovakia	1984	Defected from Czechoslovakia after he created a homemade aircraft, which he flew to Vienna International Airport; subsequently settled in the U.S. and founded the Ivoprop corporation
Ladislav Pataki	Sports scientist	Czechoslovakia	1985	Defected to the U.S. via Rome, Italy; known as "the highest-ranking Soviet-bloc sports scientist ever to defect to the West"
Milan Švec	Embassy employee	Czechoslovakia	1985	Defected in Washington, D.C., where he was Minister-Counselor at the Czechoslovak embassy; later became a commentator on east–west relations
Oleg Gordievsky	KGB agent	Russia	1985	Defected to the UK via Finland; became an MI6 double agent after the 1968 Warsaw Pact invasion of Czechoslovakia and was sentenced to death in absentia
Vitaly Yurchenko	KGB agent	Russia	1985	Defected in Rome, Italy and exposed two KGB/CIA double agents, Ronald Pelton and Edward Lee Howard; later ended up back in the KGB
Mircea Florian	Musician	Romania	1986	Defected in the U.S. while on an authorised visit for a performance
Frank Lippmann	Football player	East Germany	1986	Football player of SG Dynamo Dresden; fled after a match against FC Bayer 05 Uerdingen in the quarter finals of the 1985–86 European Cup Winners' Cup
Naim Süleymanoğlu	Weightlifter	Bulgaria	1986	Defected during the World Cup final in Melbourne, Australia; traveled to Turkey
Vyacheslav Polozov	Opera singer	USSR	1986	Defected during a Madama Butterfly singing competition in Tokyo, Japan
Mihai Smighelschi	Air force cadet	Romania	1987	Flew his Aero L-39ZA Albatros jet trainer aircraft from Buzău, Romania to near Kırklareli, Turkey, where he landed on a dirt road
Tamás Buday	Sprint canoe athlete	Hungary	1987	Defected to Canada
Jürgen Sparwasser	Football player	East Germany	1988	Defected to West Germany while taking part in a veterans' tournament in Saarbrücken
Mihai Șubă	Chess player	Romania	1988	Defected to the UK during the 1988 Lloyds Bank chess tournament in London
Miodrag Belodedici	Football player	Romania	1988	Defected to Belgrade, Yugoslavia
Luboš Kubík	Football player	Czechoslovakia	1988	Defected from a Czechoslovakia national football team training camp in West Germany to Belgium alongside Ivo Knoflíček; eventually settled in Italy after signing for Fiorentina
Ivo Knoflíček	Football player	Czechoslovakia	1988	Defected from a Czechoslovakia national football team training camp in West Germany to Belgium alongside Luboš Kubík; eventually settled in West Germany after signing for St. Pauli
Aleksandr Zuyev	Pilot	Russia	1989	Flew an Mikoyan MiG-29 to Trabzon, Turkey
Alexander Mogilny	Hockey player	Russia	1989	Defected after the World Championships in Sweden
Kalinikos Kreanga	Table tennis player	Romania	1989	Defected in Luxembourg during a youth table tennis championship
Mihai Apostol	Sprint canoe athlete	Romania	1989	-
Nadia Comăneci	Gymnast	Romania	1989	Defected weeks before the Romanian revolution to Austria
Cristian Raducanu	Rugby player	Romania	1989	-
Petr Nedvěd	Hockey player	Czechoslovakia	1989	Defected during a midget hockey tournament in Calgary, Canada
Vladimir Pasechnik	Bioweapons engineer	Russia	1989	Defected in Paris, France, to warn the West about the Soviet biological weapons program
Zuo Xiukai	Military officer	China	1989	Defected to South Korea from his post at the Joint Security Area
Richard Kruspe	Musician	East Germany	1989	Defected to West Germany after political imprisonment
Marco Köller	Football player	East Germany	1989	Football player of BFC Dynamo; left for West Germany only a short time before the fall of the Berlin Wall
Gorsha Sur	Ice dancer	Russia	1990	Defected to the U.S. while on tour, along with Igor Shpilband, Veronica Pershina, and Elena Krykanova
Igor Shpilband	Ice dancer	Russia	1990	Defected to the U.S. while on tour, along with Gorsha Sur, Veronica Pershina, and Elena Krykanova
Elena Krykanova	Ice dancer	Russia	1990	Defected to the U.S. while on tour, along with Gorsha Sur, Igor Shpilband, and Veronica Pershina
Veronica Pershina	Pair skater	Russia	1990	Defected to the U.S. while on tour, along with Gorsha Sur, Igor Shpilband, and Elena Krykanova
Sergei Fedorov	Hockey player	Russia	1990	Defected in Seattle, Washington during the Goodwill Games
Vitali Vitaliev	Author	Ukraine	1990	Became a regular on BBC television in the UK

== See also ==
- List of Commonwealth of Independent States defectors
- List of Western Bloc defectors
