= Emil Poklitar =

German footballer (1939–2026)

Personal information
- Date of birth: 14 June 1939
- Place of birth: Tatanir, Romania
- Date of death: 4 October 2026 (aged 87)
- Position: Forward

Senior career*
Years	Team	Apps	(Gls)
1958–1959	BSG Rotation Babelsberg		
1960–1961	SC Dynamo Berlin		
1961–1962	Tennis Borussia Berlin		
1962–1964	Freiburger FC		
1964–1969	1. FC Saarbrücken		

Managerial career
- 1980: 1. FC Saarbrücken
- 1981: 1. FC Saarbrücken
- * Club domestic league appearances and goals

Emil Poklitar (14 June 1939 – 4 October 2026) was a German football striker.

Poklitar was born in Tatanir, Romania on 14 June 1939. While playing for SC Dynamo Berlin, he defected to West Berlin after a friendly match against Boldklubben af 1893 at Idrætsparken in Copenhagen on 13 August 1961. He died on 4 October 2026, at the age of 87.
