= Jonas Pleškys =

Soviet naval commander

- Born: March 10, 1935; Near Tverai, Lithuania
- Died: April 12, 1993 (aged 58); Oakland, California, United States
- Occupations: Soviet Navy barge captain Programmer/analyst
- Known for: One of the inspirations for Tom Clancy's book The Hunt for Red October
- Children: 2
- Relatives: Sister Eugenija Pleškytė

Jonas Pleškys (March 10, 1935 – c. April 12, 1993) was a Soviet Navy barge captain who defected from the Soviet Union to the United States in April 1961. As a captain of a barge, he directed his vessel to Gotland, Sweden, where he asked for political asylum. The crew and the barge were returned to the Soviet Union. His defection served as an inspiration for Tom Clancy's book The Hunt for Red October.

== Biography ==
=== Early life ===
Pleškys was born on March 10, 1935, near Tverai in western Lithuania to Juozas Pleškys and Barbora Rapalytė Pleškienė, a family of landless peasants. The family had 17 children, but only seven reached adulthood. One of his sisters was actress Eugenija Pleškytė. Pleškys was 5 years old when the Soviet Union occupied the independent Republic of Lithuania in June 1940. Pleškys' mother died of tuberculosis in 1946, and his father married a woman who owned 40 hectares (99 acres) of land before the war. This was likely sufficient to label the family as "bourgeoisie." The step-mother's family also had connections with the Lithuanian partisans. As such, Pleškys' parents were deported to Siberia during Operation Vesna in May 1948. Pleškys and two siblings were also taken, but it is said that their father managed to push them out of the moving train. In 1952, Pleškys was expelled from a pedagogical school in Telšiai due to writing down anti-Soviet statements during a class.

Pleškys then continued his education at the Telšiai Gymnasium and joined the Lithuanian Komsomol. He received excellent grades, but was not admitted to the Kaunas Polytechnic Institute likely because his deported parents made him "politically unreliable". In 1954, he was conscripted to serve in the Soviet Navy. After nine months of courses in Leningrad, Pleškys was admitted to the advanced submarine courses at the Lenin Komsomol Higher Submarine Navigation School in Leningrad. He graduated in June 1959 as a submarine navigator. Pleškys briefly served in a submarine before reassignment as captain to an auxiliary vessel collecting waste fuel from marine engines. Pleškys received the rank of lieutenant.

=== Defection ===
In early 1961, Pleškys married Zoja Rozenkranc, who was already pregnant with their daughter Sondra. On April 6, 1961, upon learning that his vessel would be transferred from Klaipėda to Paldiski in Soviet-occupied Estonia, Pleškys directed his barge Smolny north to dump the collected waste fuel in neutral waters of the Baltic Sea. The ship had nine crew members. By Liepāja, Pleškys changed course directly towards Gotland, an island of Sweden. Due to stormy weather, the crew was unaware of the changed course. When the barge reached the shores of Gotland, Pleškys ordered to fire flares to indicate request for help. He asked the only other Lithuanian crew member Jurgis Kryžiokas into a lifeboat and sailed about 1 kilometre (0.62 mi) to the shore. They were met by coastguards. Pleškys indicated that he wanted to defect and asked for political asylum and suggested Kryžiokas do the same, but he refused.

The next day, three Swedish ships escorted Smolny to Slite. Personnel of the Russian embassy, including military attaché Vitaly Nikolsky, arrived to deal with the matter. The crew discovered that Smolny's compass and navigational charts were destroyed. The vessel was assigned a new captain and departed Gotland on April 8. In neutral waters, Smolny was met by a Soviet minesweeper which replaced the entire crew of Smolny and returned the vessel to Liepāja.

=== Later life ===
The military tribunal of the Baltic Fleet sentenced Pleškys in absentia to execution on August 29, 1961. He spent the rest of life afraid that the KGB was coming after him.

Pleškys was picked up by the CIA and debriefed to ensure that he was not a double agent working for the KGB. What is known about his later life is still very fragmentary as CIA files concerning Pleškys remain classified. Eventually, he received a U.S. passport under the name Jonas Plaskus. At various times, he was at a submarine repair docks, taught basics of computer programing at the University of Washington, worked at a bank in San Francisco. In 1968, he enrolled into the International Language School to study Spanish. There, he met Laura Cajas de Martinez and they married the same year. They had daughter Jennifer Plaskus and the marriage lasted five years.

For five years, he traveled to various countries. From 1972 to 1973, he worked under contract with the United States Agency for International Development (USAID) in Guatemala and Costa Rica. He briefly returned to the United States and worked as a computer programmer. In 1979, he disappeared and spent three years growing his own food and living in a remote cabin in Mexico. According to his biographer Marijona Venslauskaitė-Boyle, it was the only place where he felt safe from the KGB. In 1986, Pleškys returned to the United States and got a job as a systems management specialist with the American President Companies in Oakland. In 1988, he met his sister actress Eugenija Pleškytė in Houston when she toured with her theater troupe. The KGB approved her travels, hoping that they could track her brother through her.

In 1990, he was diagnosed with a brain tumor. That year, Lithuania declared independence. The Supreme Court of Lithuania vacated his death sentence in 1992, which allowed Pleškys to briefly return to Lithuania and meet his daughter, Sondra, for the first time. He died in his sleep a few days before April 14, 1993, when his body was found in his apartment in Oakland, California.

== Legacy ==
Pleškys' defection was one of two incidents that inspired Tom Clancy in his writing of The Hunt for Red October. The other was the 1975 mutiny aboard the Soviet frigate Storozhevoy.

Pasmerktas myriop (Condemned to Death), a documentary about Pleškys directed by Henrikas Šablevičius, was released in 1999. In 2005, Marijona Venslauskaitė-Boyle, who knew Pleškys in his last years, published Search For Freedom: The Man From Red October about his life.

== See also ==
- The Defection of Simas Kudirka, a drama film based on the attempted defection by a Lithuanian merchant seaman
- List of Eastern Bloc defectors
