= List of Commonwealth of Independent States defectors =

Defectors from Commonwealth of Independent States

The following is a list of defectors from the Commonwealth of Independent States. The Commonwealth is an intergovernmental organization formed after the dissolution of the Soviet Union as its legal successor. This list of defectors is not to be confused with Soviet defectors.

Notable defections after 1991 regarding Commonwealth of Independent States intelligence
Defector	Profession/ Prominence	Birthplace	Year	Notes
Kanatjan Alibekov	Bioweapons chief	Kazakhstan	1992	Former director of Biopreparat; defected to the United States
Boris Yuzhin	KGB agent	Russia	1992	KGB lieutenant colonel who from the mid-1970s to mid 1980s was resident spy of the 1st Department of the Directorate "K" in San Francisco and on this time he revealed many intelligence secrets from Soviet Union to FBI. For this espionage he was arrested in the 1986 and sentenced to 15 years in the Gulag. Defected to U.S. after pardon by Boris Yeltsin
Rollan Dzheikiya	Ministry of Foreign Affairs diplomat	Georgia	1992	In the early 1990s he was senior counselor in Permanent Mission of Russia to the United Nations; defected to U.S. and revealed at least that Earl Edwin Pitts was Soviet Union and Russia spy
Stanislav Lunev	GRU agent	Russia	1992	Defected to the U.S.; revealed the existence of KGB weapons caches in the West
Vasili Mitrokhin	KGB agent	Russia	1992	KGB archivist who was shocked by records of Soviet political repression; defected in Riga, Latvia to the British embassy
Viktor Makarov	KGB agent	Russia	1992	KGB senior lieutenant who in the mid-1980s was analyst of the 16th Directorate and on this time he revealed some intelligence secrets from Soviet Union to MI6. For this espionage he was arrested in the 1987 and sentenced to 10 years in the Gulag. Defected to United Kingdom via Latvia after pardon by Boris Yeltsin and later he waged a long legal battles with government over insufficient funding
Viktor Oshchenko	SVR agent	Russia	1992	SVR colonel who in the early 1990s was resident spy of Directorate "X" in Paris, France; defected to United Kingdom and revealed many intelligence secrets from Soviet Union and Russia, including that Michael John Smith was Soviet spy
Vladimir Potashov	Institute for US and Canadian Studies scientist	Russia	1992	Doctoral degree scientist who was senior military analyst from the end 1970s to mid 1980s and on this time he revealed many intelligence secrets from Soviet Union to CIA, including Soviet plans for nuclear disarmament. For this espionage he was arrested in the 1986 and one year later sentenced to 13 years in the Gulag. Defected to U.S. via Poland after pardon by Boris Yeltsin
Valentin Aksilenko	KGB agent	Russia	1993	KGB colonel who in the early and mid 1980s was chief Washington, D.C. branch of the 1st Department of the Directorate "K"; defected to U.S. and revealed some intelligence secrets from Soviet Union
Yuri Shvets	KGB agent	Ukraine	1993	KGB major who in the mid-1980s was resident spy of the 1st Department of the Directorate "K" in Washington, D.C.; defected to U.S.; revealed some political and intelligence secrets from Soviet Union and Russia
Oleg Kalugin	KGB agent	Russia	1995	KGB general who in the late 1970s was head of Directorate "K"; defected to U.S. and revealed many political and intelligence secrets from Soviet Union
Viktor Orekhov	KGB agent	Ukraine	1997	KGB captain who from the mid to late 1970s was investigator of 5th Directorate in the Moscow and on this time he revealed some intelligence secrets to Soviet dissidents. For this disclosure of country secrets he was arrested in the 1978 and later in same year was sentenced to 8 years in prison. After serving sentence he remained in Soviet Union and later Russia, where in the 1995 was arrested and later sentenced for illegal possession of weapon to 3 years in prison. Defected to U.S. after pardon by Boris Yeltsin
Alexander Zaporozhsky	SVR agent	Georgia	1998	SVR colonel who in the early and mid 1990s was deputy chief of the 1st Department of the Directorate "KR"; defected to U.S.; revealed many intelligence secrets from Russia, includind that Harold James Nicholson is a Russian spy. But in the 2001 he returned to Russia for unclear reasons where was detained and two years later sentenced to 18 years in prison for espionage. In 2010 he was returned in U.S. during the exchange of prisoners between U.S. and Russia
Alexander Litvinenko	FSB agent	Russia	2000	Exposed crimes ordered by Russian president Vladimir Putin; defected in London, United Kingdom; assassinated
Evgeny Toropov	SVR agent	Russia	2000	SVR agent of the 1st Department of the Directorate "KR" who in the end 1990s and early 2000s was head of security Russian embassy in the Ottawa, Canada; defected at first to Canada and later to U.S.; revealed some intelligence secrets from Russia. Sudden death occurred in unnamed place in April 2010; foul play has been alleged
Sergei Tretyakov	SVR agent	Russia	2000	Defected in New York City to the CIA; Deputy Resident Station Chief in New York City; revealed many political and intelligence secrets from Russia; sudden death occurred in Sarasota County, Florida, on June 13, 2010; foul play has been alleged
Vyacheslav Baranov	GRU agent	Belarus	2002	GRU colonel who in the end 1980s was chief of the technical specialists group of the 3th Directorate in Bangladesh and on this time he revealed some intelligence secrets from Soviet Union to CIA. For this espionage he was arrested in the 1992 and one year later sentenced to 6 years in prison. Defected to U.S. after serving sentence
Aleksandr Poteyev	SVR agent	Belarus	2010	SVR colonel who since the late 1990s was deputy head of Directorate "S"; defected to U.S.; revealed many intelligence secrets from Russia, includind personalities of Russian agents from Illegals Program. After defect survived two assassination attempts
Alexandr Shcherbakov	KGB agent	Russia	2010	In an unknown time he was the deputy head of Directorate "K"; defected to U.S.; revealed at least that Robert Hanssen was Soviet Union spy and after the collapse of this country become Russian spy
Sergei Skripal	GRU agent	Russia	2010	GRU colonel who in the late 1990s was director of the agency personnel department and on this time he revealed many intelligence secrets from Russia to MI6. For this espionage he was arrested in the 2004 and two years later sentenced to 13 years in prison. Defected to United Kingdom in the result exchange of prisoners between U.S. and Russia. After defect survived an assassination attempt
Alexander Dubinin	GRU agent	Russia	2013	GRU agent who in the early 2010s was scout of the 25th Separate Special Purpose Regiment; defected to Ukraine where was arrested in the 2014 for allegedly espionage and sentence to 13 years in prison but later acquitted. After acquitted entered the Russo-Ukrainian war
Ilya Bogdanov	FSB agent	Russia	2014	FSB senior lieutenant of the Border Service who in the early 2010s was at first detective in Dagestan and later inspector in Primorsky Krai; defected to Ukraine and entered the War in Donbas and Russo-Ukrainian war
Ilya Ponomarev	State Duma member	Russia	2014	Centre-left politic from end 2000s who vote against annexation of Crimea and openly spoke out against Vladimir Putin; defected at first to U.S. and later to Ukraine where entered the Russo-Ukrainian war
Denis Voronenkov	Former State Duma member	Russia	2016	Centre-left politic from early 2010s who after leaving office openly spoke out against Vladimir Putin; defected to Ukraine; assassinated
Oleg Smolenkov	Presidential Administration official	Russia	2017	From early 2010s he was counselor of the 3rd class of the Higher Group and chief assistant Yuri Ushakov; defected to U.S. via Montenegro; revealed some political secrets from Russia
Gennady Gudkov	Former State Duma member	Russia	2019	Centre politic from early 2000s to the early 2010s who openly spoke out against Vladimir Putin; defected to Bulgaria
Pavel Latushko	Ministry of Foreign Affairs diplomat	Belarus	2020	From the early to end 2010s he was a Belarus ambassador extraordinary in the France, Spain, Portugal and Monaco; defected to Poland after support Belarusian protests in the 2020
Dmitry Gudkov	Former State Duma member	Russia	2021	Centre politic from early to the mid-2010s who not voted for annexation of Crimea and openly spoke out against Vladimir Putin; defected to Bulgaria via Ukraine
Boris Bondarev	Ministry of Foreign Affairs diplomat	Russia	2022	From the end 2010s he was counsellor in Permanent representative to the United Nations Office and other International Organizations in Geneva, Switzerland; defected to Switzerland
Denis Sharonov	Former agriculture minister of the Komi Republic	Russia	2022	Defected to the U.S. via Kyrgyzstan, the United Arab Emirates, and Mexico to avoid conscription in the Russian Army following the invasion of Ukraine, which he blamed on his falling out with officials of the regional government
Gleb Irisov	Former TASS journalist	Russia	2022	In the early 2020s he was military correspondent; defected to U.S. via Armenia, Georgia, Turkey and finally Mexico and revealed some intelligence secrets from Russia and Iran
Igor Volobuev	Gazprom employee	Ukraine	2022	From the mid-2010s he was vice president of the Gazprombank; defected to Ukraine and entered the Russo-Ukrainian war
Marina Ovsyannikova	Former Channel One journalist	Ukraine	2022	From the early 2000s she was a news producer; defected to France
Mikhail Kasyanov	Former prime minister of Russia	Russia	2022	Held his position from the early to mid 2000s and after leaving office openly spoke out against Vladimir Putin; defected to Latvia
Pavel Filatyev	VDV soldier	Russia	2022	VDV senior sergeant who in the early 2020s was paratrooper of the 56th Guards Air Assault Regiment; defected to France; revealed some military secrets from Russia
Igor Salikov	GRU agent	Russia	2023	GRU major who in the mid-2010s participated in the supplies of weapons to pro-Russia separatist during the War in Donbas and after he took part in the initial stage of the Russo-Ukrainian war; defected to Netherlands via Turkey and Northern Cyprus and revealed some intelligence secrets from Russia
Maksim Kuzminov	VKS pilot	Russia	2023	Attack pilot of the 319th Separate Helicopter Regiment of the Eastern Military District; defected to Ukraine in a Mi-8AMTSh helicopter during the Russo-Ukrainian war; assassinated
Alexey Zhilyaev	SV soldier	Russia	2024	SV sergeant who in the mid-2020s was medic of the 144th Guards Motor Rifle Division; defected to France and revealed many military secrets from Russia

== See also ==
- List of Soviet and Eastern Bloc defectors
