= The Hunt for Red October =

1984 thriller novel by Tom Clancy

- First edition cover
- Author: Tom Clancy
- Language: English
- Series: Jack Ryan
- Release number: 1
- Genre: Techno-thriller; Military fiction; Spy fiction; Historical fiction
- Publisher: Naval Institute Press
- Publication date: October 1, 1984
- Publication place: United States
- Media type: Print (hardcover, paperback)
- Pages: 387
- ISBN: 0870212850
- Followed by: Patriot Games

The Hunt for Red October is the debut novel by American author Tom Clancy, first published on October 1, 1984, by the Naval Institute Press. It depicts Soviet submarine captain Marko Ramius as he seemingly goes rogue with his country's cutting-edge nuclear ballistic missile submarine Red October, and marks the first appearance of Clancy's most popular fictional character, Jack Ryan, an analyst working for the Central Intelligence Agency, as he must prove his theory that Ramius plans to defect to the United States.

The Hunt for Red October launched Clancy's career as a novelist, especially after US President Ronald Reagan remarked that he had enjoyed reading the book. A film adaptation was released on March 2, 1990 by Paramount Pictures, and several computer and video games based on the book have been developed. The book was instrumental in bringing the book genre of techno-thriller into the mainstream.

== Plot ==
During the Cold War, Soviet Navy submarine commander Marko Ramius plans to defect to the United States with the Typhoon-class ballistic missile submarine Red October. It is equipped with a "caterpillar drive", a cutting-edge silent propulsion system that makes audio detection by passive sonar difficult and enables the submarine to sneak its way into American territorial waters and launch nuclear missiles with little to no warning. As the sub leaves the shipyard at Polyarny, Ramius kills his political officer to ensure that he will not interfere. Ramius was ordered to conduct military exercises with Soviet Alfa-class attack submarine V. K. Konovalov, commanded by his former student Viktor Tupolev, to test the effectiveness of the caterpillar drive. Instead, he plots a course for the North American coast, falsely informing the crew that they will be proceeding undetected to Cuba. Before sailing, Ramius sends a letter to Admiral Yuri Padorin stating his intention to defect to the United States and to give them Red October; the Soviet Northern Fleet then sails out to sink Red October under the pretext of a search and rescue mission.

Red October passes near USS Dallas, a Los Angeles-class submarine under the command of Bart Mancuso, which is patrolling the entrance of a route used by Soviet submarines in the Reykjanes Ridge off Iceland. Dallas's sonar operator hears the sound of the stealth drive, and, though he does not initially identify it as a submarine, comes to realize that it is the sound of a new propulsion system. After losing Red October in the underwater route, Dallas heads to the end of the route in hopes of reacquiring the ship when it emerges.

At the same time, Jack Ryan, an analyst with the Central Intelligence Agency working in London as the CIA's liaison with the British Secret Intelligence Service, returns to the United States to deliver secret photos of the new submarine. After conferring with submarine expert Skip Tyler, Ryan determines that the submarine's new construction variations house a stealth drive. Soon thereafter, the CIA's leadership receives word from a highly-placed Soviet agent CARDINAL informing them of Ramius' letter to Padorin and his intention to hand Red October over to the US. Due to a limited number of aircraft carriers in the northern Atlantic Ocean at that time, the United States enlists the aid of the Royal Navy in the search for Red October, and Ryan is sent to the carrier HMS Invincible to coordinate their efforts.

With the Soviet fleet stretched out along the American coast searching for Red October, tensions between the US/UK and USSR fleets begin to mount. An Alfa-class submarine is lost when it sinks following a reactor meltdown while racing to the American coast, while two US F-14 Tomcats' attempt to scare a squadron of Soviet fighter jets with sonic booms results in the Soviets accidentally firing missiles at the American aircraft. On board Red October, tension also begins to mount with the crew after evidence is found of a saboteur damaging the nuclear reactor and vital safety equipment. Ramius and his senior officers blame the sabotage on American spies who must have boarded the ship while it was in port. In Washington, D.C., the Soviet ambassador makes repeated trips to the White House to consult with the president of the United States about his fleet's search for their "missing" submarine, while one of the deputy directors of the CIA meets with a member of the Senate Intelligence Committee, who is inquiring about the Soviet presence. The deputy director falsely tells the senator the CIA has received classified information from Israel that states covert Polish intelligence agents operating at the Polyarny shipyards replaced the original orders onboard the ship, and faked the letter to Padorin to make it appear that Ramius was defecting. The senator repeats the story to his aide, an undercover Soviet mole who is arrested shortly after relaying the information to his handler.

Meanwhile, Skip Tyler works with the Pentagon to develop a plan that would allow the United States to keep Red October without the Soviet Union knowing they have it. Dallas and Invincible locate Red October, and, after making contact via Morse code, the three ships head to a designated spot to rendezvous with the decommissioned US ballistic missile submarine USS Ethan Allen. A helicopter carrying Russian-speaking US military officers is dispatched to meet with Ramius and carry out the covert plan, but it crashes into the ocean, killing all onboard. As a result, Ryan, along with Owen Williams, a Russian-speaking British Lieutenant, is ordered by the president to board Red October and execute the plan instead.

After Ramius fakes an even bigger reactor accident, Ryan and the US Navy evacuate Red October's crew using a DSRV rescue submarine. Ramius and his officers stay behind, claiming that they plan to scuttle the submarine to prevent it from getting into the hands of the Americans. With the crew removed, Ramius and his officers formally request to defect, which Igor Loginov, an undercover GRU officer disguised as a cook who has secretly remained onboard, overhears. As Red October covertly moves out of the area and Ethan Allen is blown up in its place, Loginov fatally shoots Soviet Captain Lieutenant Kamarov and critically wounds Williams before attempting to rig one of the ship's missiles to explode. Ryan and Ramius attempt to stop him, resulting in a firefight, with Ramius being wounded and Ryan killing Loginov. Not knowing what booby traps Loginov has set on the missile, the area is cleared, and the missile is ejected into the sea.

With the ship secure, Mancuso and a handful of Dallas crewmembers are brought onboard Red October, while a doctor is flown in to treat Williams and Ramius. Ryan asks Mancuso to remove a depth gauge from the control panel of the ship, and Red October is escorted by Dallas and another submarine to hide in Pamlico Sound off North Carolina. The Soviet ambassador is informed by the White House that Red October had been found and most of the crew removed before it was unfortunately destroyed in a reactor meltdown. A Soviet agent is dispatched to board a US salvage craft to inspect the wreckage, where it "finds" the removed depth gauge as well as the ejected missile. Convinced Red October has been destroyed, the majority of the Soviet fleet is ordered home, with several Alfa-class submarines ordered to secretly remain behind to gather intelligence by spying on the American fleet.

In the Soviet Union, the Politburo is informed that their American spy had learned the letter sent to Padorin was fake and the orders onboard the ship were changed without his knowledge, and the KGB is tasked to investigate whether Marko Ramius was a true defector or a loyal patriot. Several agents are sent on the flight to retrieve the rescued crew members, all of whom report when questioned that Ramius was a loyal Soviet captain who was outraged by the sabotage done to their ship and adamant he would not let the Americans have Red October.

After waiting two days for the Soviet fleet to clear the area, Dallas and the other American submarine begin escorting Red October to Norfolk, Virginia. Konovalov, having been ordered to remain behind, happens upon them and begins to monitor them, initially believing it to be an American Ohio-class. Based on its acoustic signature, Tupolev realizes that it is Red October, and gives the order to attack it, damaging it with a successful torpedo strike. The rules of engagement prevent the American submarines from firing on the Soviets unless they are fired upon first, leaving Red October to fight off the enemy submarine on its own despite having no torpedomen onboard. After blocking another torpedo attack by deliberately running into the torpedo before it had time to arm, Red October sinks Konovalov by ramming into it, killing Tupolev and his crew.

The Americans escort Red October into dry dock in Norfolk, Virginia, where it is analyzed by US military intelligence. Ramius and his crew are taken to a CIA safehouse and are given new identities, beginning their settlement into American lives. Ryan is commended and debriefed by his superiors and returns to his posting in London.

== Characters ==
=== The Soviets ===
- Captain 1st rank Marko Aleksandrovich Ramius: Soviet submarine captain who commands the Red October, the Soviet Navy's newest ballistic missile submarine. His decision to defect was spurred by personal factors. His wife, Natalia, had died at the hands of an intoxicated and incompetent doctor; however, the doctor escaped punishment because he was the son of a Politburo member. Natalia's untimely death, combined with Ramius's long-standing disillusionment with the callousness of Soviet rule and his fear of Red October's destabilizing effect on world affairs, exhausts his tolerance for the failings of the Soviet system.
- Captain 2nd rank Viktor Aleksievich Tupolev: Commanding officer of the Alfa-class attack submarine V. K. Konovalov and Ramius's former student.
- Captain 2nd rank Vasily Borodin: Executive officer of Red October
- Captain Lieutenant Gregoriy Kamarov: Navigator of Red October
- Dr. Yevgeni Konstantinovich Petrov: Red October's medical officer
- Igor Loginov: GRU intelligence officer, on duty aboard the Red October as a cook in order to prevent the defection or capture of the vessel
- Alexei Arbatov: Soviet ambassador to the United States
- Captain 2nd rank Ivan Yurievich Putin: Political officer (zampolit) aboard the Red October. Killed by Ramius so that he will not interfere with his defection.
- Admiral Yuri Ilyich Padorin: Chief political officer for the Soviet Navy, Ramius's uncle-in-law and mentor

=== The Americans and the British ===
- Dr. John Patrick "Jack" Ryan: Central Intelligence Agency liaison to the Secret Intelligence Service; former Marine lieutenant
- Commander Bartolomeo Vito "Bart" Mancuso, USN: Commanding officer of the Los Angeles-class submarine USS Dallas
- Sonar Technician 1st Class Ronald "Jonesy" Jones, USN: Sonarman aboard Dallas who first identifies Red October and its silent drive.
- Vice-Admiral John White, 8th Earl of Weston: British Royal Navy officer commanding the aircraft carrier HMS Invincible; also a personal friend of Ryan.
- Lieutenant Owen Williams, RN British Royal Navy lieutenant serving aboard Invincible who accompanies Ryan to Red October because of his Russian language skills.
- Oliver Wendell "Skip" Tyler: Instructor at the United States Naval Academy in Annapolis, Maryland who does consulting work for the US Navy. A former naval officer, he was tasked by Ryan with identifying the construction variations in Red October, which he determines to be housing a new, silent propulsion system.
- Commander Robert Jefferson "Robby" Jackson, USN: Commanding officer of Fighter Squadron VF-41 out of the aircraft carrier USS John F. Kennedy
- Dr. Jeffrey Pelt: National Security Advisor to the US President
- Rear Admiral Charlie Davenport: Director of Naval Intelligence, U.S. Navy
- Arthur Moore: Director of Central Intelligence
- Vice Admiral James Greer, USN: CIA Deputy Director (Intelligence)
- Robert Ritter: CIA Deputy Director (Operations)

== Themes ==
The Hunt for Red October introduced Tom Clancy's writing style, which included technical details about weaponry, submarines, espionage, and the military. The accurate nature of Clancy's writing was well known among the American military such that Clancy remarked in a 1986 interview: "When I met Navy Secretary John Lehman last year, the first thing he asked me about the book was, 'Who the hell cleared it?'"

The novel shares elements with James Clavell's works, particularly Shōgun (1975) and Noble House (1981), where political power is used instead of physical confrontation with an enemy. Clancy portrays the Soviets, especially Captain Ramius, sympathetically, and most characters are understandable in their actions and fears, while at the same time comparing and contrasting their philosophies and values against their American counterparts, who in turn are shown as more competent in their profession, this being explained by the US Navy being better equipped and trained than the Soviet sailors who are mostly conscripts.

In the novel, the US and its service personnel are unmistakably the "good guys". The central theme of the US being flawed, but ultimately a force for good and hope in the world is something the author would explore more in his later novels. However, unlike The Hunt For Red October, these later novels often include negative American characters, motivated by power or greed.

In addition, The Hunt for Red October is considered a coming-of-age story regarding the main character Jack Ryan. However, instead of running away from responsibilities, a theme common in contemporary American literature, Clancy subverts the convention by having Ryan rushing toward the burdens of the adult world. Moreover, the book introduced Jack Ryan as a new archetype of the American hero – an everyman who uses his prior knowledge instead of physical power in solving a particular crisis.

== Development ==
From a young age, Clancy was an avid reader of naval history and sea exploration but was later rejected from serving in the military because of his poor eyesight. Since graduating from high school and eventually earning an English major, he had always wanted to write a novel. He eventually worked as an insurance agent for a small business owned by his then-wife's family.

In his spare time, Clancy started working on The Hunt for Red October on November 11, 1982, and finished it four months later on February 23, 1983. Clancy consulted technical manuals, discussions with former submariners and books like Norman Polmar's Guide to the Soviet Navy and Combat Fleets of the World to maintain accuracy in describing Soviet submarines.

He then submitted the first draft of the novel to the Naval Institute Press, where he previously wrote an article on the MX missile for their magazine Proceedings of the U.S. Naval Institute. Three weeks later, the publication company returned his manuscript, along with a request to cut about a hundred pages' worth of numerous technical details. After fixing his work, Clancy then sold The Hunt for Red October to the Naval Institute Press for a modest sum of $5,000.

Having recently decided to publish fiction, the publication company made Clancy's work their first published novel. Editor Deborah Grosvenor later recalled convincing the publishers: "I think we have a potential best-seller here, and if we don't grab this thing, somebody else would." She believed Clancy had an "innate storytelling ability, and his characters had this very witty dialogue".

== Theories about source of the story ==
The 2005 book The Last Sentry: Valery Sablin and the True Hunt for Red October by Gregory D Young and Nate Braden suggests that the novel was based on the mutiny of the soviet frigate Storozhevoy in 1975. While Clancy was researching the mutiny, he read Young's master thesis about the incident. Clancy wrote to Young asking for a reference copy and permission to quote the thesis in the novel he was drafting. Clancy outlines The Hunt for Red October in considerable detail and concludes by asking Young for other reliable naval reference books.

The 2020 Muse Entertainment documentary The Real Hunt for Red October claims that the story of Red October is based on the loss of Soviet submarine K-129, which was lost in 1968, and recovered by 1974's Project Azorian.

The 1976 defection of Viktor Belenko flying his MiG-25P "Foxbat" aircraft from the Soviet Union to Japan may also have influenced the work.

== Reception ==
=== Critical ===
The book received critical acclaim, especially from the American government. U.S. President Ronald Reagan had pronounced the book, which was given to him as a Christmas gift, as "the perfect yarn" and "unputdownable"; his endorsement eventually boosted the novel's sales and solidified Clancy's reputation as a bestselling author. Regarding the reception, Clancy remarked: "I was thunderstruck, dumbfounded, bowled over, amazed. But I wasn't surprised." Many members of the White House were fans of the book.

The Hunt for Red October was also popular among the military. On a 1985 visit to USS Hyman G. Rickover, Clancy discovered 26 copies of the novel among the crew. Reid Beddow of The Washington Post praised it as "the most satisfactory novel of a sea chase since C. S. Forester perfected the form" and "a tremendously enjoyable and gripping novel of naval derring-do."

=== Commercial ===
Due to an extensive marketing campaign by the Naval Institute Press for their first published work of fiction, which was initially aimed at the military, the book sold 45,000 copies by March 1985. Clancy said in a 1991 interview: "I thought we'd sell maybe five thousand or ten thousand hardcovers and that would be the end of it. I never really thought about making money."

After Reagan's endorsement, The Hunt for Red October topped the national bestseller lists, particularly The New York Times. It eventually sold more than 365,000 copies in hardcover. After securing the paperback rights to Berkley Books for $49,500, the novel sold another 4.3 million copies.

== Adaptations ==
=== Film ===
The novel was adapted as a feature film, which was released in the United States on March 2, 1990. Captain Marko Ramius was played by Sean Connery, while Alec Baldwin played Jack Ryan. It serves as the first entry in the Jack Ryan film series, which would later follow a chronological order differing from the novels. The movie is a nearly faithful depiction of the novel even though there are many deviations, including Red October traveling up the Penobscot River in Maine to dry dock, the omission of the Royal Navy task force including Ryan's time aboard HMS Invincible, and the "caterpillar drive" being described as a magnetohydrodynamic drive system, essentially, "a jet engine for the water", rather than a drive powered by a series of mechanical impellers inside flow tunnels. Although in both the novel and movie, the caterpillar drive was supposed to be undetectably silent.

The film received mainly positive reviews from critics, holding an 88% rating from Rotten Tomatoes based on 74 reviews. The IMDb rating is 7.5 / 10. It was the sixth top-grossing film of the year, generating $122 million in North America and more than $200 million worldwide in box office. In a 1991 interview, Clancy remarked of the film's success: "It was reasonably true to the spirit of the book, although the movie had a lot of technical errors in it and some changes in the story which I do not think is necessary. But you have to remember that the printed word and visual representation on the screen are two different art forms and they have very different roles."

=== Games ===
The novel also became the basis for three computer, video, and console games. One version, a combination of a submarine simulator and strategy game, was released in 1987 and received positive reviews. Another game based on the movie was released in 1990. The console game was released in 1991 for the Nintendo Entertainment System and later for the Game Boy and Super Nintendo Entertainment System. In addition, a board game The Hunt for Red October, published in 1988 by TSR, Inc. became one of the all time bestselling wargames.

In late 2015, River Horse announced it had acquired the rights and intended to crowdfund another game based on the intellectual property.

== Legacy ==
The Hunt for Red October popularized the book genre of techno-thriller into the mainstream. "Tom Clancy defined an era, not just of thrillers but of pop culture in general," said Jon Land, an author and marketing chair for the International Thriller Writers. "No one encapsulated the mindset and mentality of the Reagan era more, as the Cold War was heating up for the last time and we were entering a new age of modern warfare. Clancy's books tapped into our fears and helped define our psyches, even as he reinvigorated the thriller genre by bringing millions of new readers into the fold."

On April 20, 2018, The Hunt for Red October was included in the list of 100 most-loved books in the U.S., compiled by PBS as part of their new series and multi-platform initiative The Great American Read.

== See also ==
- Jonas Pleškys
- Valery Sablin
- Crazy Ivan
- Simas Kudirka
