= The Assets =

2014 American drama television miniseries

- Genre: Thriller
- Created by: Sandra Grimes; Jeanne Vertefeuille
- Based on: Circle of Treason
- Starring: Jodie Whittaker; Paul Rhys; Harriet Walter; Ralph Brown; Stuart Milligan; Christina Cole; Catalina Denis; Lex Shrapnel
- Composer: H. Scott Salinas
- Country of origin: United States
- Original language: English
- No. of seasons: 1
- No. of episodes: 8

Production
- Executive producers: Morgan Hertzan; Rudy Bednar; Andrew Chapman
- Producer: James Elkus
- Cinematography: Darran Tiernan
- Editor: Steve Mirkovich
- Running time: 42 minutes
- Production companies: Baltic Films Services; Lincoln Square Productions

Original release
- Network: ABC
- Release: January 2 – August 3, 2014

The Assets is an eight-part American drama television miniseries that aired on ABC in 2014. The series was based on the book Circle of Treason: A CIA Account of Traitor Aldrich Ames and the Men He Betrayed by retired CIA officers Sandra Grimes and Jeanne Vertefeuille. The series was executively produced by Morgan Hertzan, Rudy Bednar and Andrew Chapman. The pilot episode earned a 0.7 rating in the 18-to-49-year-old demographic, making The Assets the lowest rated drama premiere ever on one of the big three networks.

On January 10, 2014, ABC canceled The Assets due to low ratings. ABC Entertainment Group President Paul Lee disclosed at the Television Critics Association press tour that the unaired episodes would be made available at some point in the future. On June 21, 2014, the remaining episodes began airing on Saturdays, but after just two further broadcasts, ABC again pulled the series. The final four episodes aired in a Sunday afternoon timeslot in late July and early August 2014. All eight episodes of The Assets were then made available on Netflix on September 1, 2014.

The Assets received mixed reviews from critics. Metacritic awarded the series a "mixed or average" score of 58 out of 100, based on reviews by fifteen critics. On Rotten Tomatoes, the series holds a 56% rating with an average rating of 5.6 out of 10, based on 16 reviews. More than four years after its initial broadcast, the series was picked up by Alibi for broadcast in the United Kingdom, with broadcast set for Summer 2018, ahead of Jodie Whittaker's debut as The Doctor in Doctor Who.

== Cast ==
- Jodie Whittaker as Sandra Grimes
- Paul Rhys as Aldrich Ames
- Harriet Walter as Jeanne Vertefeuille
- Ralph Brown as Wallace Austin
- Stuart Milligan as Arthur O'Neill
- Christina Cole as Louisa Tilton
- Catalina Denis as Rosario Ames
- Lex Shrapnel as Mitch Weaver
- Julian Ovenden as Gary Grimes
- Goran Kostić as Victor Cherkashin
- John Lynch as Vitaly Yurchenko
- Peter Guinness as Dmitri Polyakov
- Amelia Clarkson as Kelly Grimes
- Akie Kotabe as Eric D'Amaro

== Episodes ==
No.	Title	Directed by	Written by	Original release date	U.S. viewers (millions)
1	"My Name Is Aldrich Ames"	Jeff T. Thomas	Drew Chapman	January 2, 2014	3.77
In 1985, CIA agent Aldrich Ames hands over top-secret files to the Russian embassy in Washington, D.C. At a counter-intelligence meeting, agent Sandra Grimes discusses a high-ranking KGB officer, who gave the CIA valuable intel in the 1970s. A money drop is scheduled, but the asset and his handler are both captured by the KGB. The handler is released but the asset is shot dead. The whole situation bothers Sandra and she investigates. She learns the asset at the money drop was a plant, as the real asset was a spy and had likely been captured long before the drop. She fears a mole in the CIA. Meanwhile, in Italy, a man claiming to be a senior counter-intelligence colonel in the KGB calls the U.S. embassy to say he wishes to defect.
2	"Jewel in the Crown"	Jeff T. Thomas	Drew Chapman	January 9, 2014	2.92
Vitaly Yurchenko defects to the U.S. Ames is assigned to be his initial debriefing agent. Ames is fearful Yurchenko will expose him as a spy, but the man doesn't recognize him. However, he does confirm a mole in the CIA. Sandra is concerned about their asset, General Dmitri Polyakov, known as "Top Hat", but he is later warned by his son of traitors. Yurchenko knows the traitor's code name, Mr. Robert, whom he has heard has problems with money, relationships, and drinking, and is now ex-CIA. The CIA is now focused on Edward Lee Howard, who was fired two years ago.
3	"Trip to Vienna"	Adam Lucas Feinstein	Alex Berger	June 21, 2014	1.25
Yurchenko fingers Edward Lee Howard as the mole but Sandy remains concerned about other likely leaks. Sandy does her best to show that her asset General Polyakov is trying to get in touch with the CIA. With a distracted CIA, Ames forms an improbable bond with Yurchenko.
4	"What's Done Is Done"	Rudy Bednar	Bruce Terris	June 28, 2014	1.46
Jeanne and Sandy are at odds over Jeanne's review of their operations. Ames is unsettled by Jeanne's presence as the Soviets are pressuring him for more information. The pressure at home on Ames is his wife's compulsive shopping habits.
5	"Check Mate"	Trygve Allister Diesen	Karen Stillman	July 27, 2014	N/A
Sandy and Jeanne continue to clash over Sandy's review of the skills and techniques employed by the agency's spies. When a man known as GTPROLOGUE contacts the agency claiming vital information concerning a communications breach, Sandy has her doubts. Ames' transfer request to Rome is approved.
6	"A Small Useless Truth"	Trygve Allister Diesen	Sarah Byrd	July 27, 2014	N/A
With differences aside, Sandy and Jeanne proceed ahead with the mole hunt. Sandy finds out General Polyakov has been compromised. Ames gets ready for a high-stakes polygraph exam.
7	"The Straw Poll"	Peter Medak	Bruce Terris	August 3, 2014	N/A
The CIA remains committed to finding those responsible for their assets' compromise, even after the fall of the Berlin Wall and the collapse of communism. Sandy is sure the likely person is Ames but is having trouble convincing the rest of the task force. Back in America after living a charmed life in Rome, Ames finds it hard to maintain that lifestyle.
8	"Avenger"	Peter Medak	Drew Chapman	August 3, 2014	N/A
Even though the task force is convinced of Ames' guilt, Sandy looks for definitive proof so the Justice Department can proceed. Sandy's dedication to the job tries on Gary's patience. Ames is finally caught and brought to justice, but he mulls what—if anything—he's willing to say.
