= 1995 CIA disinformation controversy =

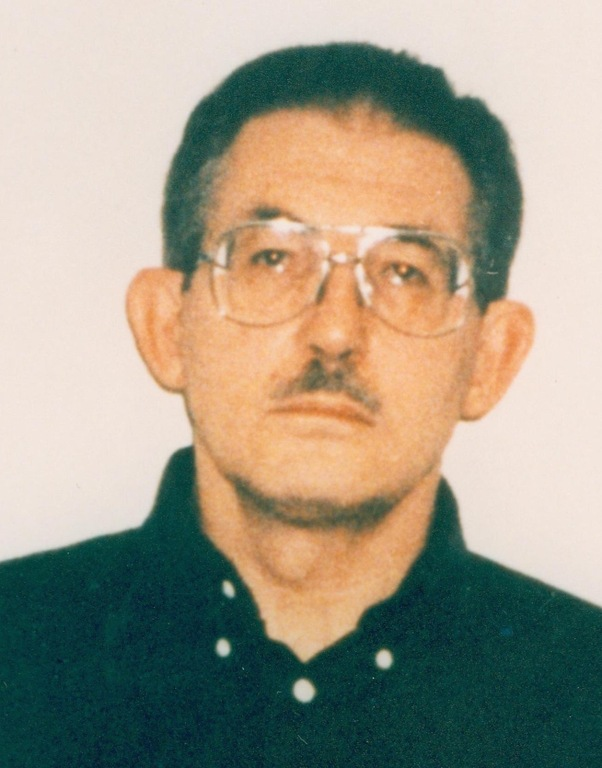
Mugshot of KGB mole Aldrich Ames, following his 1994 arrest.

In 1995, it was revealed that the Central Intelligence Agency had delivered intelligence reports to the U.S. government between 1986 and 1994 which were based on agent reporting from confirmed or suspected Soviet operatives. From 1985 to his arrest in February 1994, CIA officer and KGB mole Aldrich Ames compromised Agency sources and operations in the Soviet Union and Eastern Europe, leading to the arrest of many CIA agents and the execution of at least ten of them. This allowed the KGB to replace the CIA agents with its own operatives or to force them to cooperate, and the double agents then funneled a mixture of disinformation and true material to U.S. intelligence. Although the CIA's Soviet-East European (SE) and Central Eurasian divisions knew or suspected the sources to be Soviet double agents, they nevertheless disseminated this "feed" material within the government. Some of these intelligence reports even reached Presidents Ronald Reagan and George H. W. Bush, as well as President-elect Bill Clinton.

The disclosure of the deception in 1995, following investigations into the Ames case, led to a media stir and heavy congressional criticism. The Agency's Inspector General, Frederick Hitz, identified 12 CIA personnel he deemed responsible for the lapse, including three former directors; CIA Director John M. Deutch criticized seven of these employees, calling the affair "a major intelligence failure". A damage assessment determined that the disinformation altered intelligence analyses of the Soviet (and later Russian) military towards the end of the Cold War, creating a false impression of Soviet strength; however, initial charges that the faulty reports led to billions of dollars' worth of Pentagon spending proved to be exaggerated. Regardless, the revelation further undermined the CIA's credibility in the wake of the Ames case.

== Background ==
Aldrich Ames, a CIA counterintelligence agent working in the SE Division, approached the Soviet Embassy in Washington, D.C., on April 16, 1985, and within a month received $50,000 from the KGB in exchange for espionage service. Meeting with Soviet official and go-between Sergey Dmitriyevich Chuvakhin on June 13, Ames passed him copied documents identifying over ten Soviet agents working for the CIA and FBI. As a CIA review related, the Soviets began arresting and sometimes executing U.S. operatives later in 1985, and the CIA realized that it "was faced with a major CI problem." Suspicions initially fell on Edward Lee Howard, a former CIA officer who also compromised CIA operations in 1985 and defected to the Soviet Union on September 21. However, the CIA realized by fall 1985 that Howard was not responsible for all of the damage. Three agents arrested in fall 1985 and later executed, some of the CIA's most valuable sources, had been betrayed by Ames, not Howard. By December, six SE agents had vanished, a trend which continued into 1986; according to a congressional report, the over 20 operations Ames revealed "amounted to a virtual collapse of the CIA's Soviet operations." Ames, who stated that he spied for the KGB due to his financial debt, gave thousands of pages of classified documents to the Soviets and later admitted to disclosing over 100 CIA, FBI, military, and allied operations; he was deemed responsible for the arrests and executions of ten U.S. sources.

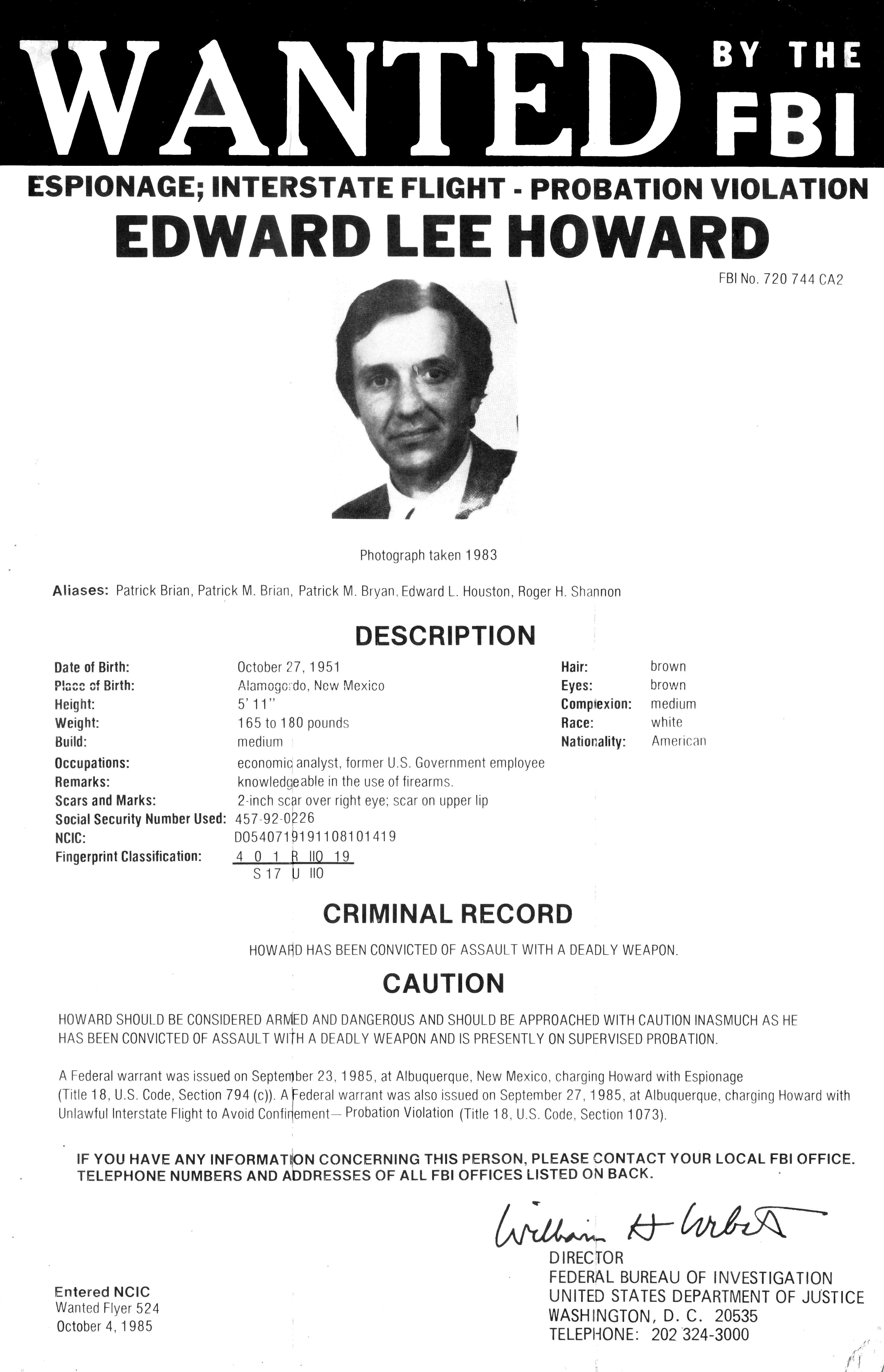
FBI wanted poster of U.S. defector Edward Lee Howard.

Moreover, by compromising CIA methods, Ames enabled the KGB and its successor, the SVR, to filter feed material to the CIA from 1986 to 1993. In 1987, KGB agent Aleksandr Zhomov offered to sell the CIA intelligence on how the Soviets had detected and arrested the CIA's agents. The SE Division accepted Zhomov and assigned him the cryptonym GTPROLOGUE. Zhomov, who was actually a Soviet double agent assigned to protect Ames, furnished fake documents ascribing the CIA's agent losses to superior KGB surveillance and luck. He then told the CIA that he would identify upcoming KGB plants, but only on the condition that the CIA treat them as genuine, lest the KGB discover the leak and arrest him. The fake agents soon overwhelmed Moscow Station's resources, and Zhomov disappeared in July 1990 after receiving payment from the U.S. The spurious sources and the disinformation they provided reportedly convinced the CIA that the 1985–1986 debacle was an anomaly, thus protecting Ames. Other genuine CIA agents were compromised by the Soviets, who used them to feed false intelligence back to the U.S.

The CIA began to investigate the disappearances of its agents, initially suspecting that bad tradecraft, a Soviet breach of Moscow Station or the CIA's communications, or a mole was responsible for the disaster. Suspicions fell on spy dust (METKA), a KGB compromise of CIA cables, or new Soviet surveillance tactics, but these probes proved unsuccessful. Ames' conspicuous spending drew the attention of the molehunters in late 1989, but he passed a polygraph test. However, the molehunt regained momentum in 1991 as it received more officers to work on the case. Attention focused on Ames and other suspects, and his finances were investigated once more in 1992; in August, the investigators linked Ames' bank deposits with his meetings with the Soviets. In March 1993, the molehunter unit concluded that there was a KGB mole within the CIA who had followed Howard, and the FBI began close surveillance of Ames, monitoring his office and home, and tracking his car. A June 25 search of his office found about 144 classified documents unrelated to his work; an analysis of his finances found an unexplained $1,326,310; and subsequent searches of Ames' trash and residence found further documents on CIA operations and agents, as well as Ames' own espionage for the KGB. On February 21, 1994, Ames and his wife, Rosario, were arrested by FBI agents: The duo pled guilty to espionage, and the Senate Intelligence Committee requested that the CIA's Inspector General review the case.

== Initial revelation ==
On October 31, 1995, CIA Director John M. Deutch presented two investigations into Ames' espionage to the House and Senate Intelligence Committees: the damage assessment conducted by Executive Director of Intelligence Community Affairs Richard L. Haver, and CIA Inspector General Frederick P. Hitz's report. The reports indicated that in the 1980s and 1990s, as a result of Ames' betrayal, the CIA had given presidents and other senior officials intelligence derived from Soviet double agents. Hitz also recommended reprimands for nearly 12 serving and former CIA officers, including several deputy directors for operations and former directors William H. Webster, Robert M. Gates, and R. James Woolsey Jr., "for not closely supervising sensitive information sent to the president." Hitz's report also claimed that CIA officers in the Directorate of Operations (DO) distributed sensitive intelligence reports despite suspecting that their sources were Soviet-controlled. However, some CIA officials reportedly disputed this, saying that the dubious sources were properly identified.

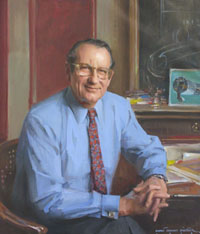
CIA Director John M. Deutch.

The same day, Deutch publicly criticized six former, and one serving, CIA officers for the "devastating" intelligence failure, although he did not hold three of his predecessors accountable. He stated that would create an independent, National Intelligence Council-managed Customer Review Process for agent reporting, and said that he had already installed new management, stressed counterintelligence at the CIA, and established new accountability boards, among other reforms. Deutch added that if the 12 CIA officers cited in Hitz's report were still employed, he would have fired two of them. He said that he had reprimanded the only officer still at the Agency, that the two officers he would have fired were "banned from future employment with the Agency," and that four others had been reprimanded or warned. Deutch insisted that efforts to improve counterintelligence would prevent a recurrence of the Ames "catastrophe," and provided the FBI with the damage assessment report so the Bureau could assist in subsequent investigations.

The CIA's 1995 damage assessment report singled out former SE Division reports chief Robert Lubbehusen for sending reports without disclosing that they were from double agents, despite Agency rules requiring warnings on such reports. He and other mid-level officers allegedly saw the controlled-agent reporting as genuine and feared that revealing the reports' sources would distract officials from the supposedly valuable intelligence. He may have also been swayed by pressure from the Defense Department for more intelligence. According to reporter James Risen, reports officers were sometimes more knowledgeable about CIA sources than case officers, and were "often the first to see the raw intelligence and thus had the opportunity to describe the sources in the reports." Following approval by the SE Division's chief, CIA intelligence analysts would then view the reports, but had to rely on the reports officers to describe the sources. However, one anonymous source backed Lubbehusen, saying that some of the intelligence may have been genuine material sent by the Soviets to bolster their moles' bona fides. Even after Lubbehusen was removed, his successors continued to leave out disclosures on reports, although Lubbehusen's reprimand was reputedly the strongest of the seven Deutch issued.

== Congressional and Pentagon investigations ==
Congressional committee members stated that the blend of genuine information and disinformation altered American perceptions of the USSR and possibly affected billions of dollars' worth of military acquisition decisions. Congress pointed to the multibillion-dollar F-22 fighter project as a possible result of inflated estimates on the USSR. Committee members charged that the CIA never warned the recipients of the suspicious intelligence because it sought to protect dubious sources; they cited a case in which a CIA officer forwarded 16 reports without mentioning that they were derived from a confirmed Soviet agent. In another case, questioned sources provided documents on a new Soviet anti-aircraft missile indicating it had a new capability, prompting costly American spending on aircraft radar. Senator Arlen Specter (R-Pa.), the chairman of the Senate Intelligence Committee, called the revelation "mind-boggling" and sought a hearing with Webster, Gates, and Woolsey. However, Representative Larry Combest (R-Tex.), the chairman of the House Intelligence Committee, stressed that "nothing has been proven" and that the intelligence may not have been wholly spurious. Intelligence officials countered that Specter's claims of the reports' damage were exaggerated, saying that development and acquisition decisions would never be based solely on agent reporting.

Senator Bob Kerrey (D-Neb.), vice chairman of the Senate Intelligence Committee, criticized Deutch's refusal to deem the three former CIA directors responsible, saying that they "should have known" about the tainted reports. Kerrey also cited an October 30 letter from the three former directors to Deutch, in which they defended themselves and suggested investigating the CIA's Inspector General; the trio insisted that they knew nothing of the reports and said they should not be faulted for the incident. Webster, Gates, and Woolsey stated that Hitz, in a 1991 report on the SE Division, did not highlight the problem of faulty intelligence. The trio claimed they had never seen the report and argued that Hitz had failed to detect the disinformation operation. The former directors also asked Deutch to publicly announce that he would not hold them accountable, which Kerrey denounced, saying that accountability was needed to improve Agency morale. Richard Kerr, the CIA's Deputy Director in 1991, stated that the CIA debated the authenticity of 1988 Soviet military documents provided by suspected double agents, which were forwarded to the Pentagon regardless. Kerr said he never saw Hitz's 80-page report, although a CIA spokesman confirmed that Webster's office had received it.

On November 9, 1995, Specter revealed that from 1986 to 1994, the CIA gave Defense officials, Presidents Ronald Reagan and George H. W. Bush, and President-elect Bill Clinton 95 reports from suspected or known Soviet/Russian sources. For 35 of these reports, which dealt with weapons technology and arms control, the CIA believed that they came from double agents; of these, 11 were sent to presidents, and Clinton received at least one before his inauguration. According to Specter, the presidents were not alerted to the sources of the intelligence, although reports to other agencies indicated their questionable origins. The decision to continue disseminating the reports was allegedly made by mid-level DO officers "who thought they had screened out the disinformation."

On November 1, the Department of Defense said it would examine whether the disinformation had caused wasteful spending. A November 17 report by journalist Walter Pincus indicated that the review panel, led by Defense Intelligence Agency (DIA) Director Lt. Gen. Kenneth Minihan, had not found "any policy or weapon purchase decision that 'in and of itself' was shaped by tainted Soviet intelligence". The claim that billions of dollars had been wasted on defense spending was deemed an overreaction. Former DIA chief Lt. Gen. James R. Clapper told the House Intelligence Committee that the intelligence affected no policy or weapons acquisition decisions, which was echoed by Haver.

== Damage assessment report ==
The provision of information from controlled sources without adequate warning was a major intelligence failure that calls into doubt the professionalism of the clandestine service and the credibility of its most sensitive reporting.

— CIA Director John M. Deutch

The CIA Damage Assessment Team (DAT) reviewed the credibility of all of the Agency's Soviet agents from the mid-1980s onward, then separated them into three groups: those whom Ames admitted to betraying but continued providing intelligence; those whom Ames was suspected of betraying and those whom Ames' spying may have helped the Soviets identify; and the agents whom neither Ames nor Moscow uncovered. The DAT thus deemed intelligence supplied by the first group suspicious, although investigators acknowledged that it may have included genuine material as feed. The debate over the second group's bona fides proved especially contentious, while the information from the third group of agents was considered credible despite some concerns that even they may have been compromised.

Deutch related conclusions from the DAT report on December 7, 1995. Noting that Ames assisted Soviet/Russian "'perception management operations'," Deutch acknowledged that disinformation was channeled to policymakers unaware of the reports' suspect provenance, but maintained that the operations' scope and success were unclear. Deutch said that the DAT had identified 900 reports from 1985 to 1994, then found that many of the reports were sourced from Russian- and Soviet-controlled agents. While some reports indeed came with warnings, 95 reports from suspected double agents were not labelled as such. Of those, "at least three" featured in reports to the president, including two from questioned sources and one from an agent believed to be controlled. He stated that it was critical to prevent the incident from reoccurring by informing policymakers whether reports are derived from suspected double agents, reviewing whether the disinformation influenced any decisions, and, if so, deciding if and how to react.

Deutch concluded that the Soviets attempted to persuade the U.S. that they retained superpower status and strong military research and development. He added that a DAT review of acquisition decisions showed the impact ranged from "negligible" to "measurable, but only on the margin." The DAT highlighted three particular cases where the double agents influenced analysis: a late 1980s report on "U.S. general purpose forces"; analyses that altered theater-level logistics and basing plans; and reporting that possibly exaggerated Soviet/Russian "cruise missile and fighter aircraft R&D programs." Deutch denied that the controlled reporting influenced policy and decisions, but confirmed its "substantial role in framing the debate." The Director also stated that the disinformation did not influence arms control negotiations, and that Ames' espionage hampered U.S. coverage of internal Soviet affairs, Soviet/Russian foreign policy (concerning nonproliferation and the CIS), and "The extent of the decline of Soviet and Russian military technology and procurement programs." In response, Specter and Kerrey insisted that the true extent of the damage caused by Ames was still unknown, noting that the DAT had not reviewed all intelligence reports from suspect sources and that the State Department was not included in the study. Specter also quoted a Defense official who said that accelerated procurement cost about $200 million.

== Analysis ==
Author Thomas Powers writes that the CIA continued to pass on reports from double agents because it sought to hide its Ames-inflicted losses. Former CIA Chief Historian Benjamin B. Fischer argues that "The SE Division still needed sources and still needed to produce intelligence reports," which motivated it to continue disseminating material from dubious sources. Similarly, another intelligence source recalled the "constant demands from the Defense Department's research-and-development and weapons-procurement staffs to turn over raw Soviet military intelligence as quickly as possible." Hitz later contended that the incident, which he deemed "the most bizarre case of fabrication during the Cold War," fostered "a feeling that the agency couldn't be trusted." As Deutch noted, the revelation also seriously damaged the CIA's credibility with senior officials.

== See also ==
- Robert Hanssen
- Harold James Nicholson
- John Anthony Walker
- Vitaly Yurchenko
