= Jodie Whittaker =

English actress (born 1982)

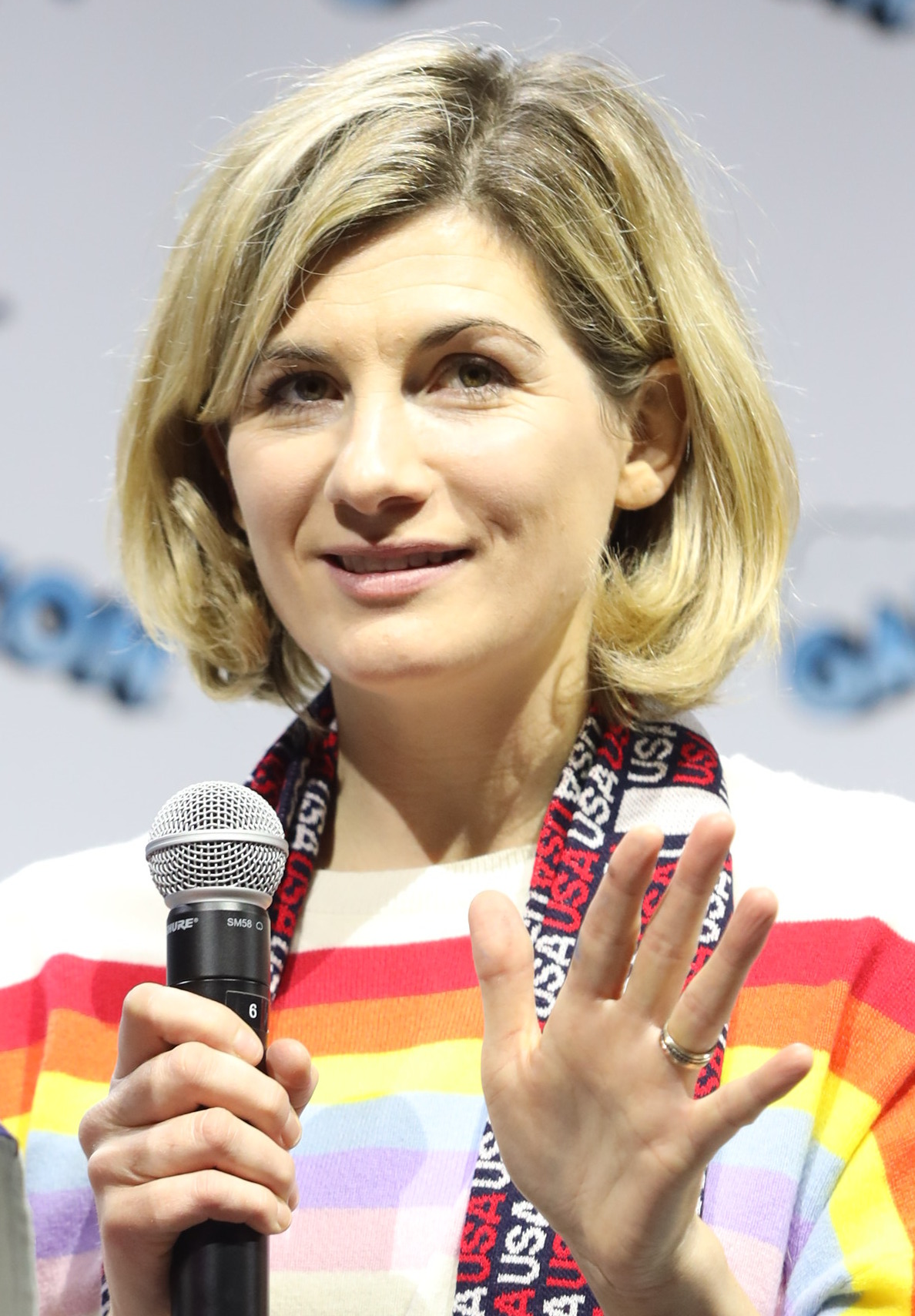
- Whittaker at the 2022 GalaxyCon Columbus
- Born: Jodie Auckland Whittaker; 17 June 1982 (age 44); Skelmanthorpe, West Yorkshire, England
- Education: Guildhall School of Music and Drama
- Occupation: Actress
- Years active: 2005–present
- Known for: Thirteenth Doctor in Doctor Who
- Notable work: Broadchurch; Doctor Who
- Spouse: Christian Contreras (m. 2008)
- Children: 2
- Jodie Whittaker's voice from the BBC Radio 4 programme Front Row, 5 October 2018

Jodie Auckland Whittaker (born 17 June 1982) is an English actress. She is best known for her roles on television as Beth Latimer in Broadchurch (2013–2017) and the Thirteenth Doctor in Doctor Who (2017–2022; 2025).

She came to prominence in her 2006 feature film debut Venus, for which she received British Independent Film Award and Satellite Award nominations. She was later praised for her roles in the science fiction film Attack the Block (2011) and the Black Mirror episode "The Entire History of You" (2011). She was nominated for the British Academy Television Award for Best Actress for her role in Toxic Town (2025).

In 2017, Whittaker became the first female and thirteenth lead actor to play the Doctor in Doctor Who; she formally assumed the role from Peter Capaldi in "Twice Upon a Time". Whittaker starred in three series and five specials, beginning with "The Woman Who Fell to Earth" in 2018 and concluding in 2022 with "The Power of the Doctor". She returned to the role in 2025 with a cameo appearance in the series 15 finale "The Reality War".

== Early life ==
Jodie Auckland Whittaker was born on 17 June 1982 in Skelmanthorpe, West Yorkshire. She is the second child and only daughter of Yvonne (née Auckland) and Adrian Whittaker. She attended Scissett Middle School and Shelley High School before training at the Guildhall School of Music and Drama, graduating in 2005 with an acting gold medal.

== Career ==
=== Early career ===
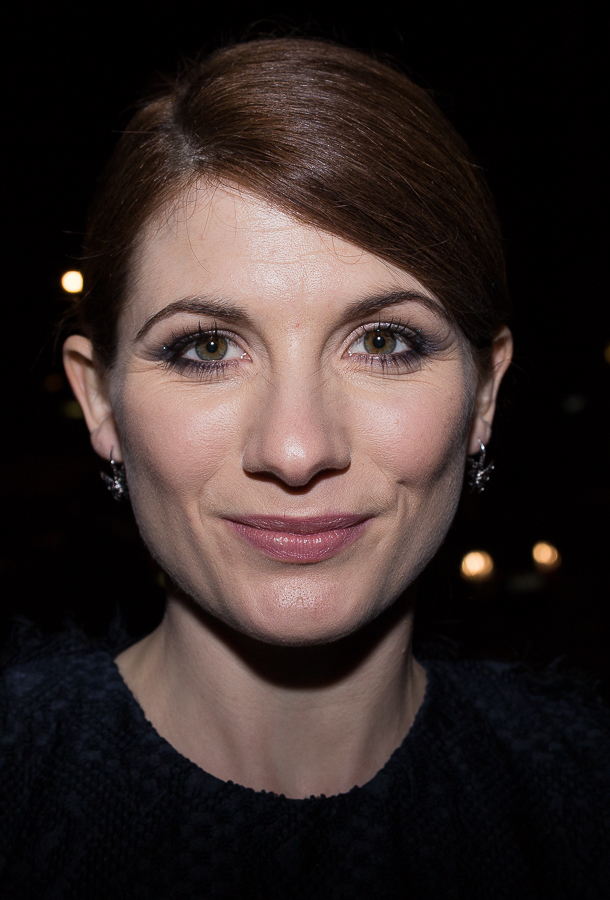
Whittaker at the 2014 British Independent Film Awards

Whittaker made her professional debut in The Storm at Shakespeare's Globe in 2005. She has since worked in film, television, radio, and theatre. In 2007, she stood in at short notice for an unwell Carey Mulligan in the Royal Court's production of The Seagull, and appeared in a fundraising play at the Almeida Theatre.

In Whittaker's first major role, she co-starred as Jessie in the film Venus (2006), receiving British Independent Film Award and Satellite Award nominations. Her radio credits at that time included a 2008 adaptation of Blinded by the Sun by Stephen Poliakoff and playing Lydia Bennett in Unseen Austen, an original drama by Judith French. In 2009, she worked on the films Ollie Kepler's Expanding Purple World and Perrier's Bounty, as well as the BBC Two drama Royal Wedding and the short film Wish 143, which was nominated for Best Live Action Short Film at the 83rd Academy Awards.

In the early 2010s, Whittaker co-starred in the anthology series Accused (2010) and the adaptation of Sarah Waters's novel The Night Watch, followed by the role of Ffion in the Black Mirror episode "The Entire History of You". In film, she starred in the cult science fiction comedy horror Attack the Block, as well as in projects like The Kid (2010), One Day (2011), Hello Carter (2013) and Good Vibrations (2013). She also returned to the stage in the contemporary staging of the classic Greek tragedy Antigone, playing the title role opposite Christopher Eccleston as Creon.

In 2014, she appeared as Sandra Grimes in the reality-based spy drama miniseries The Assets and as Anna in the BAFTA-nominated short film Emotional Fusebox, later reprising the role in its feature-length version, Adult Life Skills, and earning nominations in the Best Actress category at both the British Independent Film Awards and the National Film Awards. She also took one of the lead roles in the hit ITV crime drama Broadchurch (2013–2017) and the four-part BBC One medical drama Trust Me (2017).

=== 2017–2022: Doctor Who ===
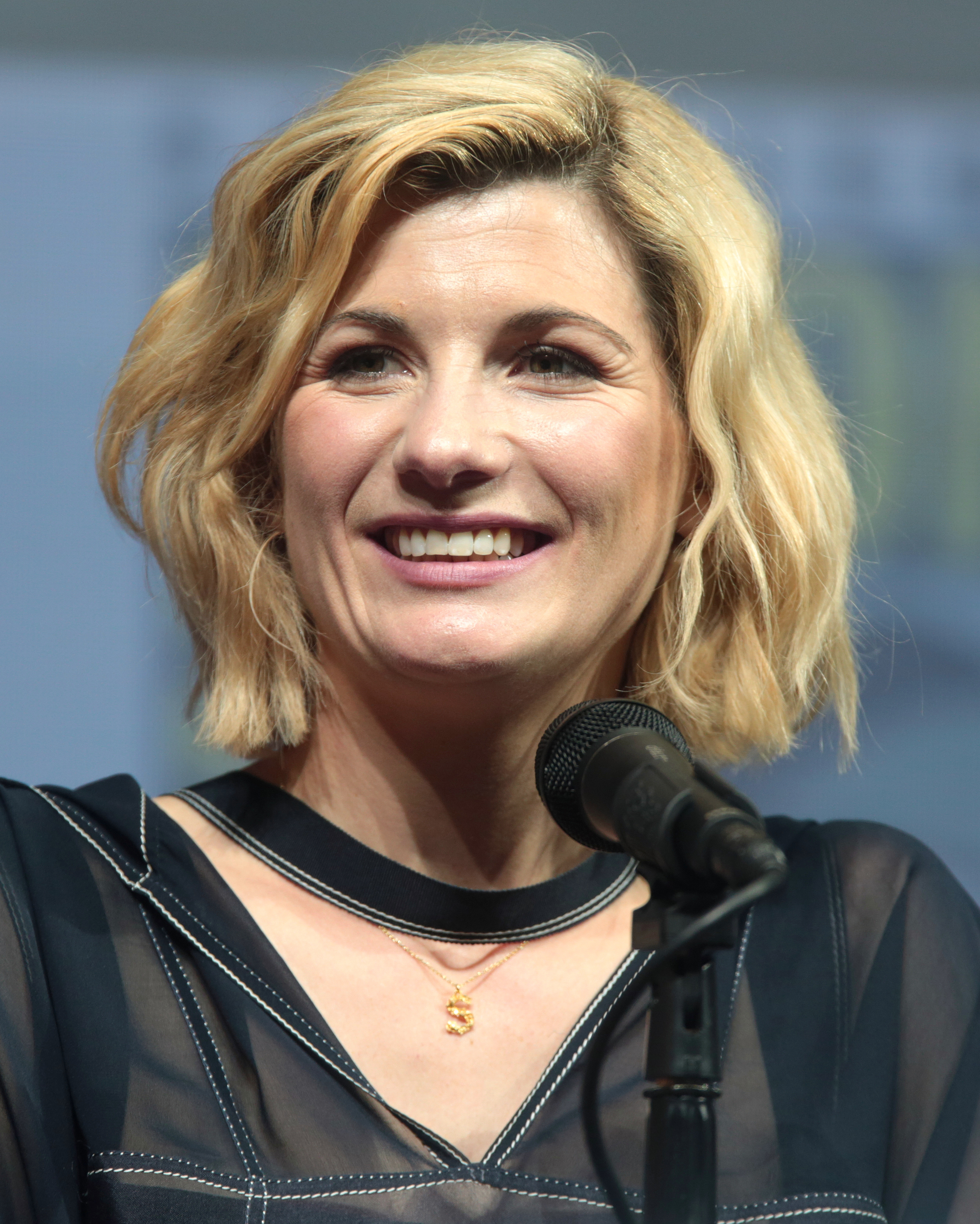
Whittaker at the 2018 San Diego Comic-Con promoting Doctor Who

On 16 July 2017, the BBC announced Whittaker would play the Thirteenth Doctor in the science fiction television series Doctor Who; she is the first woman to play the Doctor. She had previously worked with incoming Doctor Who showrunner Chris Chibnall on Broadchurch. She admitted that she had to "tell a lot of lies" after being cast to keep the information secret and used the codeword "Clooney" when talking about the role. Whittaker kept her mother in "the inner circle" regarding knowledge of the role, as her father, Adrian, "would have the ability to tell the world".

She urged fans not to be afraid of her gender, saying "Doctor Who represents everything that's exciting about change. The fans have lived through so many changes, and this is only a new, different one, not a fearful one." Chibnall said that he always wanted a woman for the part and that Whittaker was their first choice.

Reaction to Whittaker's casting was mostly positive, although a "sizeable minority" was unhappy. Some said that a female Doctor would be a good role model for young girls, while others felt the Doctor was only ever meant to be male, or criticised the casting as an exercise in political correctness.

Whittaker debuted in the 2017 Christmas special "Twice Upon a Time" while her opening episode The Woman Who Fell to Earth is the highest-viewed premiere episode of a debuting Doctor in the show's history with 10.96 million viewers.

In November 2018, the BBC confirmed that the twelfth series, Whittaker's second series, had begun production. Whittaker returned for the thirteenth series, and also voiced the Doctor in the 2022 BBC Sounds podcast Doctor Who: Redacted. She departed the programme following the series and three associated specials in 2022. Whittaker generally received praise for her performance. Though some felt the Thirteenth Doctor did little to combat social and political injustices, others felt the era's storylines were too 'politically correct', criticising what they saw as the show taking a more socially progressive outlook during Whittaker's tenure.

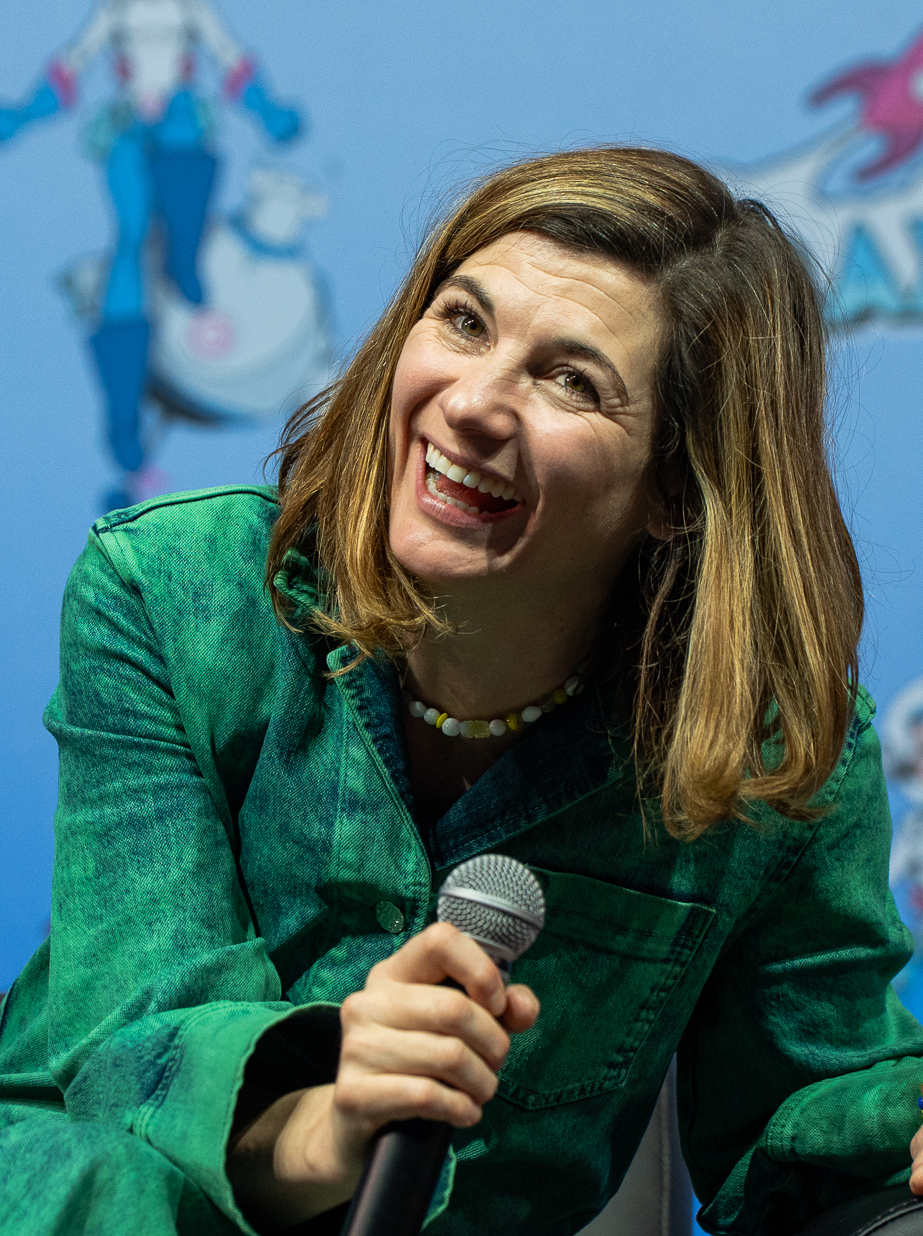
Whittaker at GalaxyCon Columbus in 2025

On May 31, 2025, Whittaker made a surprise cameo, reprising her role as the Thirteenth Doctor in the Doctor Who series 15 finale "The Reality War", alongside Ncuti Gatwa as the Fifteenth Doctor. Starting in July 2025, Whittaker reprised her role as the Thirteenth Doctor in a series of Doctor Who audio dramas from Big Finish Productions.

=== 2023–present ===
In February 2023, a press release indicated that Whittaker was filming for a six-part Australian drama series One Night for Paramount+. The series was released on Paramount+ in Australia on 1 September 2023 and in the UK and Ireland on 24 November 2023. In One Night, Whittaker played a rape victim.

In April 2023, it was announced that Whittaker would star alongside Bella Ramsey and Siobhan Finneran in the second series of the BBC prison drama Time and that filming would start in the spring of 2023 in and around Liverpool. The series premiered on BBC One in October 2023.

In August 2023, Whittaker joined the main cast of the Netflix series Toxic Town, based on the Corby toxic waste case. It was released on Netflix worldwide on February 27, 2025.

From October 2024 to December 2024, Whittaker starred in the West End stage play The Duchess.

It was announced on 30 January 2025 that Whittaker and Suranne Jones would star in Frauds, a six-part ITV art-heist series about two confidence trickster women. The tv series premiered in the UK on ITV1 6 October 2025.

It was announced on 7 July 2025 that Whittaker would star in Dear England, a four-part BBC series adapted from a hit stage play about English football manager Gareth Southgate. Southgate, to be played by Joseph Fiennes, turned around the England men's football team; Whittaker will play the team's psychologist. The series premiered on BBC One on May 24 2026.

It was announced on June 15, 2026 that Whittaker would have a recurring role in the 6th season of Hulu's Only Murders in the Building and production of the season was currently underway in the UK.. It was announced on August 25 2026 that Season 6 would premiere on Hulu on December 8 2026, with the season title of Only Murders in London.

It was announced on July 10, 2026 that Whittaker would star in and executive produce a short film The Country that was a dystopian thriller. It was announced on July 15 2026 that Whittaker would star with Ellen Pompeo in a Hulu pilot Chicks.

On September 15 2026, the trailer for Season 4 of the Netflix series The Diplomat was released and Whittaker was seen briefly towards the end. However, her role was not announced and didn't become apparent until Netflix dropped all episodes for Season 4 on October 15 2026, when it was revealed only when she appeared in her first scene that she was playing the new UK Prime Minister. It was announced on September 16 2026 that Whittaker would star in the ITV series In Contempt, about a hotshot media lawyer.

== Personal life ==
Whittaker met Christian Contreras, a Belizean-American actor and writer, in drama school, and they married in Arizona in 2008. She gave birth to their daughter in April 2015, and had their second child in 2022. During filming of Doctor Who, Whittaker and her family resided in Penarth for four years. By 2025 they had lived in London for more than 20 years.

== Filmography ==
=== Film ===
Year	Title	Role	Note	Ref.
2006	Venus	Jessie		
2007	St Trinian's	Beverly		
2008	Good	Anne Hartman		
2009	White Wedding	Rose		
2009	Thrush	Ruby's Friend	Short film	
2009	Swansong: Story of Occi Byrne	Bridget Byrne		
2009	Roar	Eva	Short film	
2009	Perrier's Bounty	Brenda		
2009	Wish 143	Maggie	Short films	
2009	Mr. Dorothy	Mitch's Wife	Short films	
2009	St Trinian's 2: The Legend of Fritton's Gold	Beverly		
2010	The Kid	Jackie		
2010	Ollie Kepler's Expanding Purple World	Noreen Stokes		
2011	Attack the Block	Samantha Adams		
2011	Two Minutes	Juliette	Short film	
2011	One Day	Tilly		
2011	A Thousand Kisses Deep	Mia Selva	Also a video operator	
2011	Hello Carter	Susie	Short film	
2012	Ashes	Ruth		
2012	Dust	Jessica's Mum	Short films	
2012	Smoke	Woman	Short films	
2013	Hello Carter	Jenny		
2013	Spike Island	Suzanne		
2013	Good Vibrations	Ruth		
2014	Get Santa	Alison		
2014	Emotional Fusebox	Anna	Short film	
2014	Black Sea	Chrissy		
2016	Adult Life Skills	Anna	Also an executive producer	
2017	Journeyman	Emma		
2018	Untitled	Mary	Short films	
2019	Rachel	Rachel	Short films	
2022	Type	Franny (voice)	Short films	
2024	That Christmas	Mrs. Williams (voice)		
2025	Truckload	Sarah	Short film	
2026	Office Romance	Lizzy		
TBA	The Country	Mother Hatch	Short film; also exec producer	

=== Television ===
Key
†	Denotes productions that have not yet been released

Year	Title	Role	Notes	Ref.
2006	The Afternoon Play	Sam	Episode: "The Last Will and Testament of Billy Two-Sheds"	
2006	Doctors	Louise Clancy	Episode: "Ignorance Is Bliss"	
2006	Dalziel and Pascoe	Kirsty Richards	Episode: "Fallen Angel"	
2007	This Life + 10	Clare	Television film	
2008	Tess of the D'Urbervilles	Izz Huett	3 episodes	
2008	Wired	Louise Evans	3 episodes	
2008	The Shooting of Thomas Hurndall	Sophie	Television film	
2008	Consuming Passion: 100 Years of Mills & Boon	Mary Boon	Television film	
2009	Return to Cranford	Peggy Bell	2 episodes	
2010	Accused	Emma Croft	Episode: "Liam's Story"	
2010	Royal Wedding	Linda Caddock	Television film	
2011	Marchlands	Ruth Bowen	5 episodes	
2011	Black Mirror	Ffion	Episode: "The Entire History of You"	
2011	The Night Watch	Vivian Pearce	Television film	
2013–2017	Broadchurch	Beth Latimer	24 episodes	
2014	The Assets	Sandy Grimes	8 episodes	
2014	The Smoke	Trish Tooley	8 episodes	
2017	Trust Me	Cath Hardacre / Dr Ally Sutton	4 episodes	
2017–2022, 2025	Doctor Who	Thirteenth Doctor	33 episodes	
2021	Comic Relief 2021	Hospital doctor	Charity sketch: "2020: The Movie"	
2023	Ready Eddie Go!	Narrator (voice)	26 episodes	
2023	One Night	Tess	6 episodes	
2023	Time	Orla O'Riordan	3 episodes (Series 2)	
2023	Tabby McTat	Narrator (voice)	Television film	
2024	The Great Celebrity Bake Off for Stand Up To Cancer	Herself / contestant	1 episode	
2025	Toxic Town	Susan McIntyre	4 episodes	
2025	Frauds	Leanne 'Sam' Samuels	6 episodes	
2026	Dear England	Pippa Grange	4 episodes	
2026	The Diplomat	Bethan Vaughan	Season 4, 3 episodes	
TBA	Only Murders in the Building †	TBA	Season 6, Recurring, eps unknown	
TBA	Chicks †	Doreen	TV pilot	
TBA	In Contempt †	Olivia Savareid	lead	

=== Commercials ===
Year	Title	Role	Notes
2010	Npower Widescreen	Penny	
2010	Npower Tyne Tees Weather idents	Penny	
2010	Npower get smart this winter	Penny	
2011	Npower Clearer Bills	Penny	
2011	Npower Ta-dah	Penny	

=== Stage ===
Year	Title	Role	Venue	Notes	Ref.
2005	The Storm	Ampelisca	Shakespeare's Globe		
2006	Enemies	Nadya	Almeida Theatre		
2007	A Gaggle of Saints	Sue	Trafalgar Studios		
2007	Awake and Sing!	Hennie Berger	Almeida Theatre		
2012	Antigone	Antigone	National Theatre		
2019	Doctor Who Escape Room: Worlds Collide	Thirteenth Doctor			
2020	Doctor Who Escape Room: A Dalek Awakens	Thirteenth Doctor			
2021	Doctor Who: Time Fracture	Thirteenth Doctor	Immersive LDN	Pre-recorded video	
2024	ECHO		Royal Court Theatre		
2024	The Duchess	Giovanna d'Aragona, Duchess of Amalfi	Trafalgar Theatre		

=== Radio and podcast ===
Year	Title	Role	Production	Notes	Ref.
2008	Blinded by the Sun	Joanna	BBC Radio 4		
2008	Unseen Austen	Lydia Bennet	BBC Radio 4		
2012	Bite	Julie	BBC Radio 4		
2016	Special Deliveries	Narrator	BBC Radio 4	Episode: "Second Class, Signed For"	
2022	Doctor Who: Redacted	Thirteenth Doctor	BBC Sounds	5 episodes	
2025-Present	Doctor Who: The Thirteenth Doctor Adventures	Thirteenth Doctor	Big Finish Productions	12 stories	

=== Video games ===
Year	Title	Role	Developer	Notes	Ref.
2019	Doctor Who: The Runaway	Thirteenth Doctor (voice)	BBC Media Applications Technologies	Virtual reality game	
2019	Doctor Who: The Edge of Time	Thirteenth Doctor (voice)	Maze Theory	Virtual reality game	
2020	Coding with the Thirteenth Doctor	Thirteenth Doctor (voice)	BBC Learning / Tynker		
2021	Doctor Who: The Lonely Assassins	Thirteenth Doctor (voice)	Kaigan Games	Cameo	
2021	Doctor Who: The Edge of Reality	Thirteenth Doctor (voice)	Maze Theory		

=== Music videos ===
Year	Title	Artist	Director	Ref.
2012	"All of You" (feat. Aruba Red and Plan B)	Riz MC	Tom McKay and Richard Pengelley	

=== Web ===
Year	Title	Role	Notes	Ref.
2017	The Thirteenth Doctor revealed	Thirteenth Doctor		
2018	Doctor Who Access All Areas	Herself	Guest; 10 episodes	
2020	The Doctors Say Thank You	Herself	part of Doctor Who: Lockdown	
2020	Message from the Doctor	Thirteenth Doctor	part of Doctor Who: Lockdown	
2020	United we stand, 2m apart	Thirteenth Doctor	part of Doctor Who: Lockdown	
2021	A Message from the Doctor	Thirteenth Doctor	part of #Findthedoctor series	

== Discography ==
Year	Title	Album	Notes	Ref.
2019	"Yellow"	BBC Children in Need: Got It Covered	Single (#5 on the Official Big Top 40)	

== Awards and nominations ==
Award	Year (Note: Year refers to the ceremony at which the award was given.)	Category	Work	Result	Ref.
Ian Charleson Awards	2006	—N/a	Enemies	Nominated	
Royal Television Society Midlands Awards	2006	Best Actress	The Afternoon Play	Won	
British Independent Film Awards	2006	Most Promising Newcomer	Venus	Nominated	
Satellite Awards	2006	Best Actress – Motion Picture Musical or Comedy	Venus	Nominated	
Critics' Circle Film Awards	2007	British Newcomer of the Year	Venus	Nominated	
Online Film & Television Association's Television Awards	2010	Best Ensemble in a Motion Picture or Miniseries (shared with the cast)	Return to Cranford	Nominated	
Fangoria Chainsaw Awards	2012	Best Supporting Actress	Attack the Block	Nominated	
Black Reel Awards	2012	Best Ensemble (shared with the cast)	Attack the Block	Nominated	
Crime Thriller Awards	2013	Best Supporting Actress	Broadchurch	Nominated	
Royal Television Society Programme Awards	2014	Best Actress	Broadchurch	Nominated	
British Independent Film Awards	2016	Best Actress	Adult Life Skills	Nominated	
National Film Awards UK	2017	Best Actress	Adult Life Skills	Nominated	
National Film Awards UK	2017	Best Breakthrough Performance in a Film	Adult Life Skills	Nominated	
Evening Standard British Film Awards	2018	Best Actress	Journeyman	Nominated	
Satellite Awards	2018	Best Actress – Television Series Drama	Doctor Who	Nominated	
Heat's Unmissables Awards	2018	Unmissable Actress of the Year	Doctor Who	Won	
National Television Awards	2019	Drama Performance	Doctor Who	Nominated	
Saturn Awards	2019	Best Actress on Television	Doctor Who	Nominated	
BAFTA Cymru Awards	2019	Outstanding Actress	Doctor Who	Nominated	
Critics' Choice Super Awards	2021	Best Actress in a Science Fiction/Fantasy Series	Doctor Who	Nominated	
Critics' Choice Super Awards	2022	Best Actress in a Science Fiction/Fantasy Series	Doctor Who	Nominated	
DIVA Awards	2022	Celebrity Ally of the Year	—N/a	Nominated	
RTS Awards	2024	Leading Actor: Female	Time	Nominated	
British Academy Television Awards	2026	Best Actress	Toxic Town	Nominated	
