= Cacheris =

Cacheris is a surname. Notable people with the surname include:

- James C. Cacheris (born 1933), American judge
- Plato Cacheris (1929–2019), American lawyer
