= Gennady Varenik =

Soviet spy for the United States

Gennady Varenik Геннадий Вареник
- Born: 1953
- Died: 25 February 1987
- Cause of death: Execution by shooting
- Education: Andropov Red Banner Institute
- Espionage activity
- Country: Soviet Union
- Allegiance: United States
- Rank: Podpolkovnik

Gennady Varenik (Russian: Геннадий Вареник; 1953 – 1987) was a KGB official who was also a CIA asset. A son of a Ukrainian SMERSH veteran, he was assigned to the First Chief Directorate of the KGB in 1982.

== Biography ==
He was a graduate of the Andropov Red Banner Institute and spent a year at TASS in Moscow preparing for his cover. He first encountered the CIA in 1982, a year after arriving in Germany, through a colleague's introduction to a CIA officer. Both sides spent over a year trying to recruit the other as a double agent. In 1983, Varenik suddenly cut off contact.

He reestablished contact with the CIA in March 1985 while in Bonn, allegedly, to get rewards for passing information in redeeming a 7000 DM (or USD) debt resulting from assigned operational funds which he had squandered. Varenik contributed information on secret KGB operations in West Germany and outed three valuable Soviet assets within the West German government. He was arrested in East Berlin in November 1985 by the KGB, interrogated using a truth drug, tried for treason and executed. He is one of the 25 Soviets betrayed by Aldrich Ames.

Upon his arrest, he had reached the rank of podpolkovnik.
