= Vitaly Yurchenko =

Soviet-era Russian intelligence officer (born 1936)

Vitaly Sergeyevich Yurchenko
- Виталий Сергеевич Юрченко
- Born: 2 May 1936 (age 90); Soviet Union
- Military career
- Allegiance: USSR
- Awards: Order of the Red Star

Vitaly Sergeyevich Yurchenko (Russian: Виталий Сергеевич Юрченко; born May 2, 1936) is a former high-ranking KGB disinformation officer in the Soviet Union. After 25 years of service in the KGB, he apparently defected to the United States during an assignment in Rome on August 1, 1985, arriving the following day. After providing the names of two U.S. intelligence officers as KGB agents, asserting that Yuri Nosenko was a true defector, and claiming that Lee Harvey Oswald was never recruited by the KGB, Yurchenko slipped away from the Americans and returned to the Soviet Union.

== Background ==
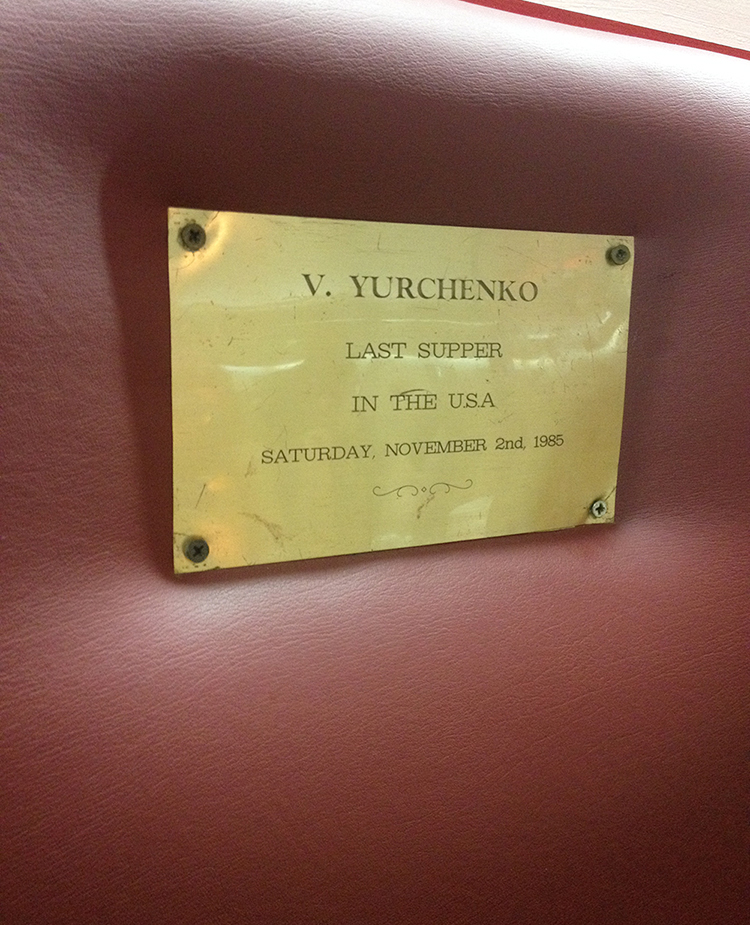
A plaque formerly displayed in a Washington, D.C. restaurant commemorated Vitaly Yurchenko's last meal in the United States.

Upon his defection to the United States, Yurchenko identified two American intelligence officers as KGB agents: Ronald Pelton and Edward Lee Howard. Pelton was later convicted, while Howard fled to the Soviet Union before he could be questioned.

=== Disappearance ===
In November 1985, before eating a meal at Au Pied de Cochon, a French restaurant in the Georgetown neighborhood of Washington, D.C., Yurchenko told his CIA guard, "I'm going for a walk. If I don't come back, it's not your fault." Yurchenko did not return.

The building, located at 1335 Wisconsin Avenue NW has a plaque commemorating the event that was once displayed in one of Au Pied de Cochon's booths.

=== Return to the Soviet Union ===
Several days later, the Soviet Embassy called a press conference, at which Yurchenko announced he had been kidnapped and drugged by the Americans. It is possible that his defection was staged to fool the CIA with wrong leads, to protect Aldrich Ames, an American who worked for the CIA and was then one of the Soviet Union's most important moles within the CIA. The KGB was reported to have secretly interrogated Yurchenko after his return, under the influence of a truth drug, to ensure he had not been recruited by the CIA as a double agent.

== Theories ==
At a 1999 Texas A&M conference attended by several CIA intelligence professionals, as well as KGB General Oleg Danilovich Kalugin, the question of Yurchenko's defection came up. Kalugin stated that Yurchenko started as a real defector, then changed his mind and redefected. Kalugin gave several points:

- The KGB typically did not use 'fake defectors' because the defection would be a propaganda problem for the Soviet government. ("People were not supposed to run from paradise")
- Yurchenko was in love with a woman married to a Soviet official and thought that they could be together in the US. This did not work out as planned.
- Yurchenko had a stomach ulcer that worried him greatly, and he thought it could be cured in the US. It was not.
- Yurchenko's defection was leaked to the media after he had been promised it would not be.
- Yurchenko "felt his freedom to move around was sort of limited by the CIA".
- Yurchenko apparently thought the KGB might treat him well because of the cases of recent re-defectors like Oleg G. Bitov and Anatoly K. Chebotarev.

Another panelist also believed he was a legitimate defector. James Olson of the George Bush School of Government and Public Service said, "I think he was a very disturbed individual and he redefected out of psychological problems that he had." Paul Redmond said that Sandra Grimes and Jeanne Vertefeuille (of the Aldrich Ames case) also believed Yurchenko was genuine. However, Redmond thought it probable that Yurchenko was sent by the KGB as a "starburst".

In his 2007 book, Spy Wars: Moles, Mysteries, and Deadly Games, former CIA officer Tennent H. Bagley says Yurchenko was a false defector sent to the U.S. to draw suspicion away from Aldrich Ames, to "verify" the bona fides of false defector Yuri Nosenko, and to confirm the importance of spies John Anthony Walker and his son, Michael. Bagley says instead of being arrested, tried, and executed upon his return to the USSR, Yurchenko was rewarded and was still in the KGB as late as 2002.

== See also ==
- List of Soviet and Eastern Bloc defectors
- List of KGB defectors
- Fake defection
