= Sergei Motorin =

Soviet double agent (executed 1987)

Sergei Mikhailovich Motorin (Russian: Сергей Михайлович Моторин; executed in 1987) was a Soviet KGB major and double agent who was arrested in Moscow in 1985 for spying for the FBI.

Motorin was one of two Soviet double agents whose identities were shared with the KGB by both CIA analyst Aldrich Ames and FBI agent Robert Hanssen. The other was Valery Martynov, who was also lured back to Moscow, tried for treason, and executed.

== Career ==
Sergei Motorin was assigned as a third secretary to the Soviet embassy in Washington, D.C., in 1980. According to the FBI's indictment of Hanssen, Motorin was a KGB Line PR officer at the embassy.

In 1983, he was recruited by the FBI after it got wind that he had been involved in an accident in Washington while in the company of a prostitute, and then observed him trying to barter his operational allowance of vodka and cigars for stereo equipment.

The FBI used both events as leverage against Motorin since he was married, and bartering operational allowances was against rules for embassy employees.

He passed the bureau information on every KGB agent within the embassy and in return got between US$100 and US$200 each time he met his handler. The FBI also deposited $500 each time for Motorin's use in case he ever had to defect. He met his FBI handler an estimated 75 times over the next several years.

== Arrest and execution ==
Motorin returned to Moscow in late 1984. In June 1985, Ames shared his identity with the KGB, before Hanssen also independently corroborated Motorin's activities as a double agent in October 1985.

Motorin was arrested in November or December 1985. He was charged with espionage in court with evidence of receiving US$20,000 from the FBI.

He was executed by gunshot in February 1987.
