= Leonid Poleshchuk =

Russian counterintelligence officer

Leonid Poleshchuk (1938–1986) was a senior Soviet counterintelligence officer and double agent who was arrested in 1985 for passing secrets to the CIA and executed in 1986.

== Career ==
Codenamed WEIGH, Poleshchuk was one of the CIA's Soviet assets exposed by Aldrich Ames.

Poleshchuk was first recruited in 1971 in Nepal by a CIA agent who paid him US$300, the exact amount the Soviet agent had lost gambling. The Soviet agent was serving as a political officer in Kathmandu at the time. He then disappeared for ten years, before reappearing in Nigeria with an offer to spy for money to buy an apartment in Moscow.

== Arrest and death ==
In 1985, Poleschuk was arrested by KGB counterintelligence operatives in a sting operation. The KGB had discovered CIA agent Paul Zalucky making a dead drop at the Severyanjin railway station on the Moscow-Yaroslavl line. Its agents later arrested Poleschuk while he was receiving the package which contained a cash payment, and discovered that he had been passing on the identities of Soviet agents in Nigeria and Nepal to American spies.

Prior to his arrest, Poleschuk served as deputy resident for counterintelligence in Lagos, Nigeria.

He was executed in 1986 and cremated.

== Personal life ==
Poleschuk was married to Lyudmila and had one child, Andrei, who was a 23-year journalist when his father was arrested.
