= Rosario Casas Dupuy =

Colombian academic and former Soviet spy

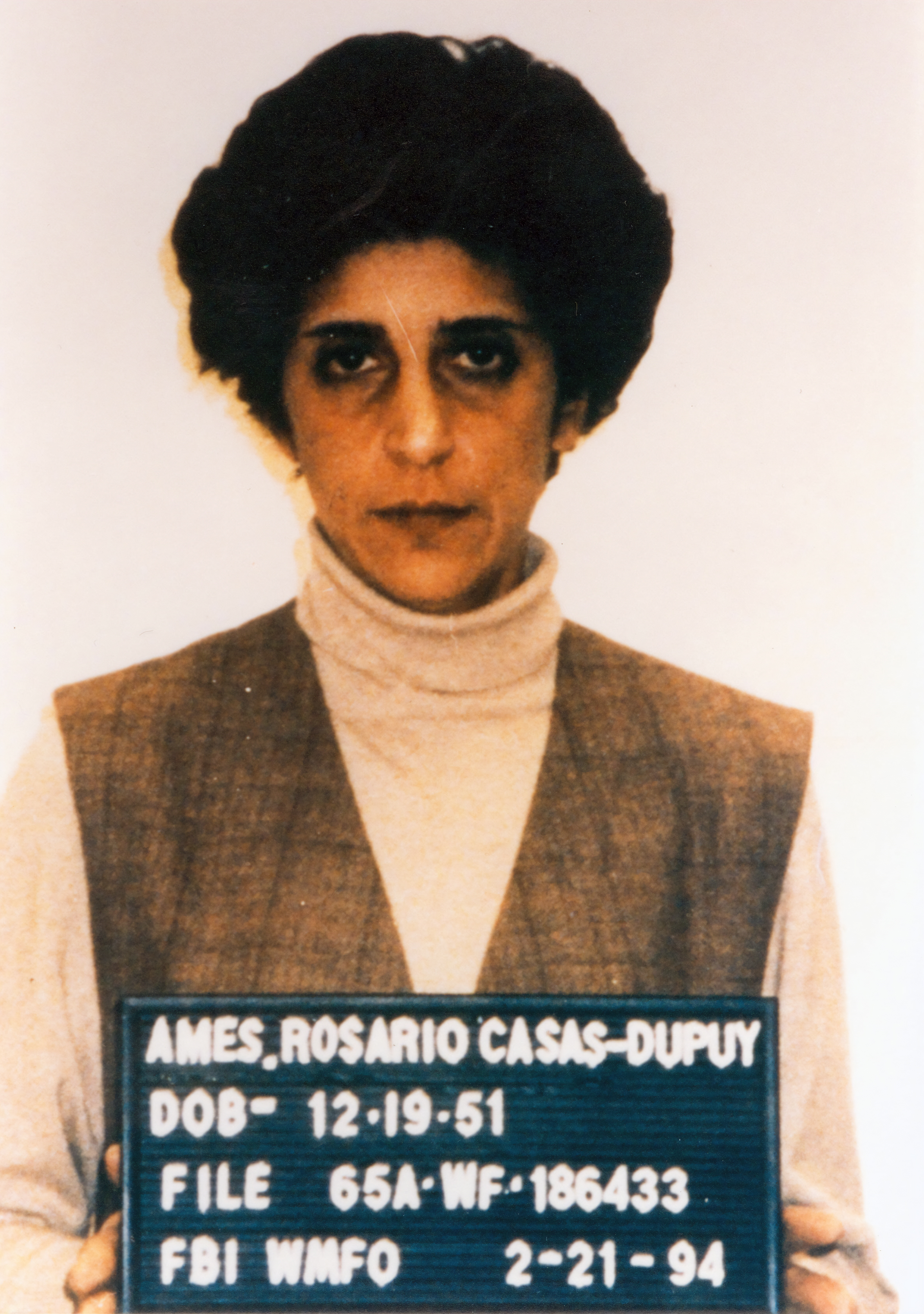
- Born: December 19, 1951 (age 74); Bogotá, Colombia
- Spouse: Aldrich Ames (m. 1985; died 2026)
- Children: 1

Academic background
- Education: Colegio Nueva Granada
- Alma mater: University of the Andes; National University of Colombia; Princeton University; Georgetown University
- Influences: Immanuel Kant; Karl Marx; Hegel

Academic work
- Discipline: Philosophy and literature
- Sub-discipline: Greek literature; French literature; North American literature; Latin American literature
- Institutions: Pontificia Universidad Javeriana; National University of Colombia
- Espionage activity
- Country: Colombia
- Allegiance: Soviet Union
- Agency: Central Intelligence Agency; KGB; SVRR
- Active: Cold War

María del Rosario Casas Dupuy (Note: In this name that follows Hispanic American naming customs, the first or paternal surname is Casas and the second or maternal family name is Dupuy. In the United States, she was also known by her married name, Rosario Ames.) (born December 19, 1951) is a Colombian academic and retired intelligence officer. During the Cold War, Casas Dupuy worked at the Colombian Embassy in Mexico City, where she met her future husband, Aldrich Ames, and was recruited by the Central Intelligence Agency. In 1994, she was caught and arrested on charges of conspiracy to commit espionage against the United States on behalf of the Soviet Union. After a confession and a negotiated plea bargain, she served four years in prison and then returned to Colombia. She has been involved in academia ever since, as a professor of literary studies and philosophy at the Pontificia Universidad Javeriana and the National University of Colombia. She has earned several honorary degrees and regional awards for her works in education.

== Early life and education ==
María del Rosario Casas was born in Bogotá in 1951 into what the Colombian press referred to as the "local aristocracy". While she was growing up, her family, and local townsfolk, would often recount the heroic spy stories of her paternal great-grandfather. Manuel Casabianca – a distant relative of Napoleon – was that famous paternal spymaster, serving during the Thousand Days' War by monitoring the activities of Rafael Uribe Uribe. He was also briefly the Commanding General of the Colombian Army.

Her grandfather was Alberto Dupuy, a renowned engineer.

Her father, Pablo Casas Santofimio, was the first professional Colombian mathematician ever trained from within the Colombian education system. After earning his degree in Colombia, he studied at Princeton University under the occasional tutelage of Albert Einstein. He later served as the mayor of San Andrés, as a senator, and as the general secretary of the Colombian Liberal Party. He also co-founded the Colombian newspaper El Cronista. After his career in politics he went back into education, becoming the rector of Jorge Tadeo Lozano University and the University of Tolima. He was teaching at the University of Tolima at the time of his death in 1982.

Her mother, Cecilia Dupuy, affectionately called Salcilia, was actively involved in the arts and assembled one of Colombia’s larger collections of Caribbean music, including bolero, danzón, and danzonete. She was well regarded among Cuban musicians and Cuban cultural figures for her work as founder and president of the Colombian José Martí Foundation, which has sponsored performances by major Cuban artists in Bogotá, including the Orquesta Aragón, Marta Valdés, and Elena Burke. These performances were mostly held at the National Theatre in Bogotá. Cecilia Dupuy was often described as a caja de música (jukebox). She made frequent trips to Cuba. However, the journalist Flavia Falquez, a family friend, stated that Cecilia Dupuy ended the musical foundation soon after the Cuban Revolution, when Castro sympathizers tried to co-opt it for political purposes.

In 1968, Casas Dupuy graduated high school at the Colegio Nueva Granada. She spent a gap year like most of the teens her age; listening to The Beatles and experimenting with the relatively recent fashion called the miniskirt, among other things.

In 1969, she entered into the University of the Andes, focusing on philosophy and literature. Despite the political ferment on campus, she was described by her fellow students as profoundly shy and apolitical; she never sympathized with the ultra-radical left-wing university groups there, and did not actively participate in the student strike of 1971, hesitant to sign petitions or commit to student demands. Her focus remained on her studies, and she left a lasting impression on her professors and peers as a serious and dedicated intellectual. She was one of the four or five top performing students of her class at the Andes. Despite her apolitical behavior, she was associated in some form with several Trotskyites as a member of the university's theatre club, but her friends would later say this was not indicative that she would become a Soviet spy.

However, Casas Dupuy's mother – still in the habit of taking regular trips to Cuba – had also entered into the University of the Andes to begin taking classes at the same time. The two of them even had many classes together. They graduated in the same year, and went into academia together.

For her master's degree, Casas Dupuy enrolled in the National University of Colombia, and began working on a thesis on the subject of Hegel's Aesthetics. She studied philosophy here under Carlos Bernardo Guitiérrez, earning her degree. Gutiérrez described her work as that of professional rigor. She did not complete her thesis work, instead choosing to move to Mexico.

== Career in diplomacy and intelligence ==
=== Mexico City ===
In 1982, President Julio César Turbay Ayala offered Casas Dupuy a position as a civil attaché at the Colombian Embassy in Mexico City. Generations earlier, her great-uncle Carlos Casabianca Castro had also served in this embassy. While she was at the embassy, she was single, and attracted the attention of most of the male members of the diplomatic corps – not just in her own embassy. Richard Thurman from the US State Department said that: "Rosario was clearly a cut above most women who came to these events. She was single, attractive, and she arrived with impressive academic and intellectual accomplishments. Everyone wanted to engage in conversations with her."

While she was there, she became a temporary delegate to UNESCO and attended the first World Conference on Cultural Policies.

Ignacio Umaña de Brigard, the former Colombian ambassador to Mexico, described Casas Dupuy as an active, hardworking, and pleasant woman, though she retained her characteristically introverted and serious nature, being a lover of art and not particularly fond of parties. Ironically, it was at a party where she was recruited into the world of intelligence. One of her required social functions here was to attend meetings and dinners of the Association of Ministers, Counselors, Secretaries and Attachés of Embassies in Mexico (AMCOSAD). These functions brought together the diplomatic corps and staffs of most of the embassies in the city. Also at these dinners were usually three of the most notorious intelligence recruiters in the Western Hemisphere at the time; David Samson from the Central Intelligence Agency (CIA), Igor Shurygin from the KGB, and Rick Ames, the US Embassy's top CIA expert on the Soviet Union.

She spoke fluent English, French and Greek, had traveled widely, and possessed an impressive cultural background. However, despite her education and sophistication, she remained somewhat naïve and inexperienced in matters of intelligence. This made her particularly susceptible to recruitment.

=== Career in the Central Intelligence Agency ===
David Samson first approached Casas Dupuy at an AMCOSAD function, assuming she was a new State Department employee based on her fluent grasp of English. Upon learning she was a newly arrived Colombian attaché, he saw an opportunity, later recalling in his case notes that new arrivals are most vulnerable to recruitment as they seek friends and routine. He began wooing her with friendship and practical help, gave her loans to cover her immediate expenses and rides to work, all while carefully gathering information about her personal life, including her alleged history of troubled affairs with married men. They eventually became lovers, despite both having other partners.

Samson eventually revealed his CIA affiliation to Casas Dupuy. Though initially shocked, she accepted it because she thought of him as a "normal human being". He soon made a subtle first request, asking her to share gossip and insights about the Soviet and Cuban diplomats she knew, framing it as a harmless favor to help him in his work. Casas Dupuy agreed, finding it difficult to refuse a friend. This evolved into her providing information on Latin American diplomats and leftist groups in Colombia.

Samson then escalated the arrangement, asking to use her apartment for clandestine HUMINT meetings with a source, offering her $200 a month. Despite finding it "weird", Casas Dupuy consented out of friendship and gave him a key. Their relationship got complicated when both of them were elected to the board of AMCOSAD, placing Casas Dupuy in direct contact with Igor Shurygin. Shurygin was extremely guarded whenever someone from the United States was in the room, but Samson assumed that he would be more open in front of someone from Latin America. Samson privately admitted this created a ripe opportunity for exploitation, confessing to the central moral conflict he faced: "How far are you willing to go to exploit someone who you really care about?"

Shurygin, meanwhile, was also actively recruiting for Soviet agents.

==== Relationship with Aldrich Ames ====
David Samson introduced Rick Ames to Rosario Casas Dupuy at an AMCOSAD tour of the National Museum of Anthropology, but their first meeting was brief. In November 1982, a mutual friend from the Canadian embassy invited them to a dinner party. There, Casas Dupuy and Ames ended up on the floor discussing the works of Umberto Eco, Carlos Fuentes and Gabriel García Márquez. Casas Dupuy thought Rick Ames was brilliant and better-read than any American she had met, while he found her beautiful and intelligent. He asked her to dance, and later, she drove him home in her used car. He invited her up to his penthouse, and they spent the night together.

Rick Ames promised to call Casas Dupuy the next day but did not. She was angry, as she was between boyfriends; her affair with a married pilot had ended, and David Samson was still with his Mexican girlfriend. When three weeks passed without a word from Rick Ames, Casas Dupuy felt he had "pulled a disappearing act". At the AMCOSAD Christmas gala, the only empty chair was next to Rick Ames, who spent the evening talking with Casas Dupuy, annoying his date. After the dance, he vanished again without calling.

After a depressing trip to New York to see his wife, Nan, Rick Ames called Casas Dupuy's apartment on New Year's Day. Her mother, Cecilia Dupuy, answered and announced an American was on the phone. Casas Dupuy assumed it was David Samson. When Rick Ames identified himself, she initially refused his dinner invitation, saying, "I've got to wash my hair." He persisted, and she finally agreed. He arrived with flowers and chocolates, charmed Cecilia Dupuy, and over dinner, they discussed T. S. Eliot and Emily Dickinson.

A few days later, Rick Ames called again, and Rosario Casas Dupuy invited him to her apartment for a home-cooked meal. The next day, Rick Ames informed his colleague David Samson that he was dating Casas Dupuy. Ames knew Samson used Casas Dupuy's apartment as a safe house, and this was his way of stating his serious intentions. For her part, Casas Dupuy found a steady partner in Rick Ames, who became a bright spot for her even as his own career in Mexico City began to suffer due to the station's focus on the Contras and his personal issues with alcohol.

A former embassy official noted that she believed she had "found the man of her life".

=== Career in the KGB and SVRR ===
They were married in August 1985, and after suffering a miscarriage, Casas Dupuy successfully gave birth to a son, Paul, in November 1988. By the time of their marriage, Aldrich Ames had already begun passing information to the KGB’s Victor Cherkashin, starting in April 1985. In 1991, shortly following the dissolution of the Soviet Union, the KGB was re-badged as the SVRR, but Ames continued feeding them information.

There are conflicting reports about when Casas Dupuy began her own involvement with the Russians. Some sources, and even some historians, suggest that both of the Amses began spying for the Russians in 1982, when they met Igor Shurygin. Some sources suggest that they were both recruited independently of the other, prior to their own first encounter. But Aldrich Ames insists that Casas Dupuy had never been recruited by the Russians until he convinced her to join.

However, one version of the story maintains that he did not disclose his espionage activities to his wife until August 1992 — by which point he had already received approximately $2 million in payments. Ames explained the sudden wealth by claiming it came from a friend in Chicago who appreciated his investment advice.

In an October 1992 letter to his KGB handlers, later recovered from the ribbon of his home printer, Ames wrote that Rosario had accepted the revelation calmly and was understanding of his secret work for the Soviets.

When the Federal Bureau of Investigation (FBI) installed listening devices in the couple's Virginia home in October 1993, the recordings allegedly captured numerous incriminating conversations. The Ameses discussed signal sites, clandestine procedures, and other tradecraft related to his espionage. On several occasions, Rosario expressed concern about his carelessness, notably questioning the wisdom of placing large sums of cash in checked luggage after a rendezvous in Bogotá.

President Bill Clinton described the matter as "serious" and instructed his National Security Advisor, Anthony Lake, along with CIA Director James Woolsey, to assess the implications for U.S. national security. Meanwhile, Congress began debating whether to suspend economic aid to Russia. Analysts familiar with the case warned that the damage caused by Ames's espionage could be among the most severe in the history of American intelligence, both during and after the Cold War.

=== Fidel Castro ===
In 1993, Casas Dupuy's mother's close ties to Cuba deepened during a trip – originally planned for a week – that turned into three-month convalescence at a hospital in Havana. The elite of the Cuban art world visited her hospital room, but this was also when she met Fidel Castro, who personally assured her of Cuba’s responsibility for her safe return home. Casas Dupuy, who had flown out to Cuba to attend to her mother, first met Fidel Castro in the hallway of her mother's hospital room. Their conversation was not recorded, but Castro later reported that he was only in the hospital that day to visit an injured recovering baseball player from the national baseball team.

== Arrest, trial, and release ==
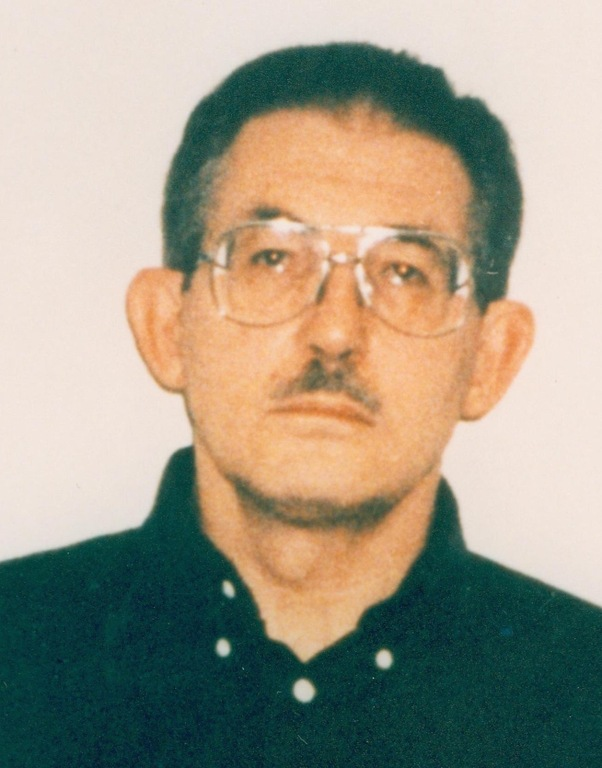
Aldrich Ames spent the rest of his life in prison before dying at the Federal Correctional Institution, Cumberland, in 2026.

Rosario was arrested at their home in February 1994, while her husband was detained a few streets away. Taken to an FBI office in Tyson's Corner, Virginia, she began confessing within three hours of questioning. Although investigators initially suspected that her prior contact with KGB agent Igor Shurygin in Mexico City in 1982 might have led to her recruitment, they ultimately determined this was not the case. Her cooperation proved extensive, and as part of a plea bargain negotiated to secure her husband's assistance in completing a full damage assessment, the charges against her were dropped.

In the 1994 plea agreement, Casas Dupuy pleaded guilty to espionage conspiracy and tax evasion, though she consistently denied ever handling CIA documents herself. She was sentenced to 63 months in prison, a concession made so she could one day be released to care for their five-year-old son, Paul. She served four years, after which she was deported to Colombia. While the couple forfeited their luxurious life in Virginia and most of the $2.5 million in Soviet bribes, they were permitted to retain three properties in Colombia to secure their son's future.

In the wake of the scandal, Casas Dupuy fought to control her own narrative. She gave a revealing radio interview, where she reflected a profound sense of betrayal and disappointment in the man she had married "for pure love". When asked if she would reunite with Ames upon their release, she expressed deep doubt, stating that their relationship was severed by the distrust his double life had sown. She also fiercely denied salacious claims from a former maid, Trinidad Chirino, who had alleged the couple led a life of alcoholism and neglect, dismissing the accusations as a "defamation campaign".

== Academic career ==
In the years following her return to Colombia, with the dissolution of the Soviet Union already having occurred, Casas Dupuy returned to education. She has not maintained any of her prior contacts, and has worked for over twenty years as a scholar of the humanities.
