= Aldrich Ames =

American CIA analyst and Soviet spy (1941–2026)

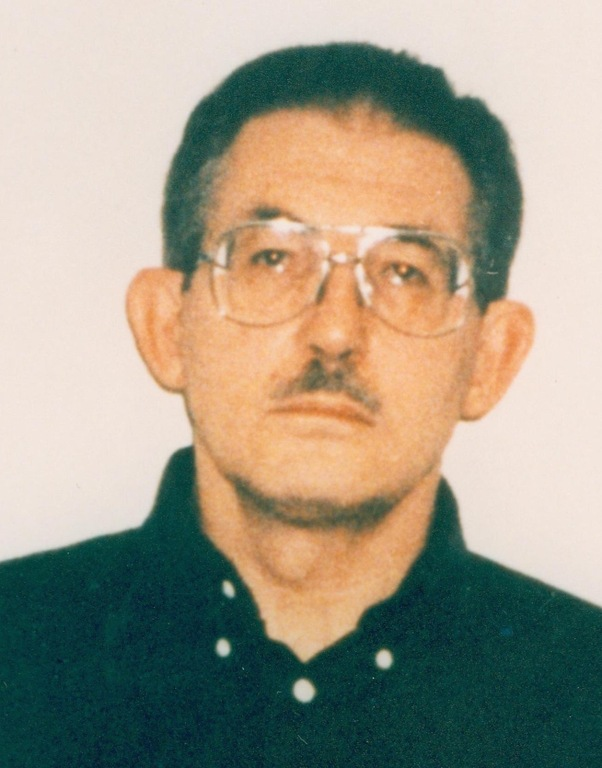
- Ames's mug shot in 1994 (Note: The mug shot gives Ames's birth month as June, but this is contradicted by other sources.)
- Born: Aldrich Hazen Ames; May 26, 1941; River Falls, Wisconsin, U.S.
- Died: January 5, 2026 (aged 84); FCI Cumberland, Maryland, U.S.
- Education: University of Chicago (attended); George Washington University (BA)
- Criminal charge: 18 U.S.C. § 794(c) (Espionage Act)
- Criminal penalty: Life imprisonment without the possibility of parole
- Criminal status: Deceased
- Spouses: Nancy Segebarth (m. 1969; div. 1983); Rosario Casas Dupuy (m. 1985)
- Children: 1 (with Casas Dupuy)
- Espionage activity
- Country: United States
- Allegiance: Soviet Union; Russia
- Agency: CIA
- Service years: 1962–1994

Aldrich Hazen Ames (/eɪmz/; May 26, 1941 – January 5, 2026) was an American counterintelligence officer with the Central Intelligence Agency who was convicted of espionage on behalf of the Soviet Union and Russia in 1994.

Ames was responsible for the arrest and eventual execution of numerous Soviet and Russian officials secretly working on behalf of the United States Intelligence Community. He served a life sentence, without the possibility of parole, in various federal prisons until his death in 2026 at the Federal Correctional Institution in Cumberland, Maryland. He had compromised more highly classified CIA assets than any other intelligence officer until the arrest of FBI agent Robert Hanssen in 2001. Both Ames and Hanssen were recruited by Victor Cherkashin, a high-ranking KGB officer.

== Early life and education ==
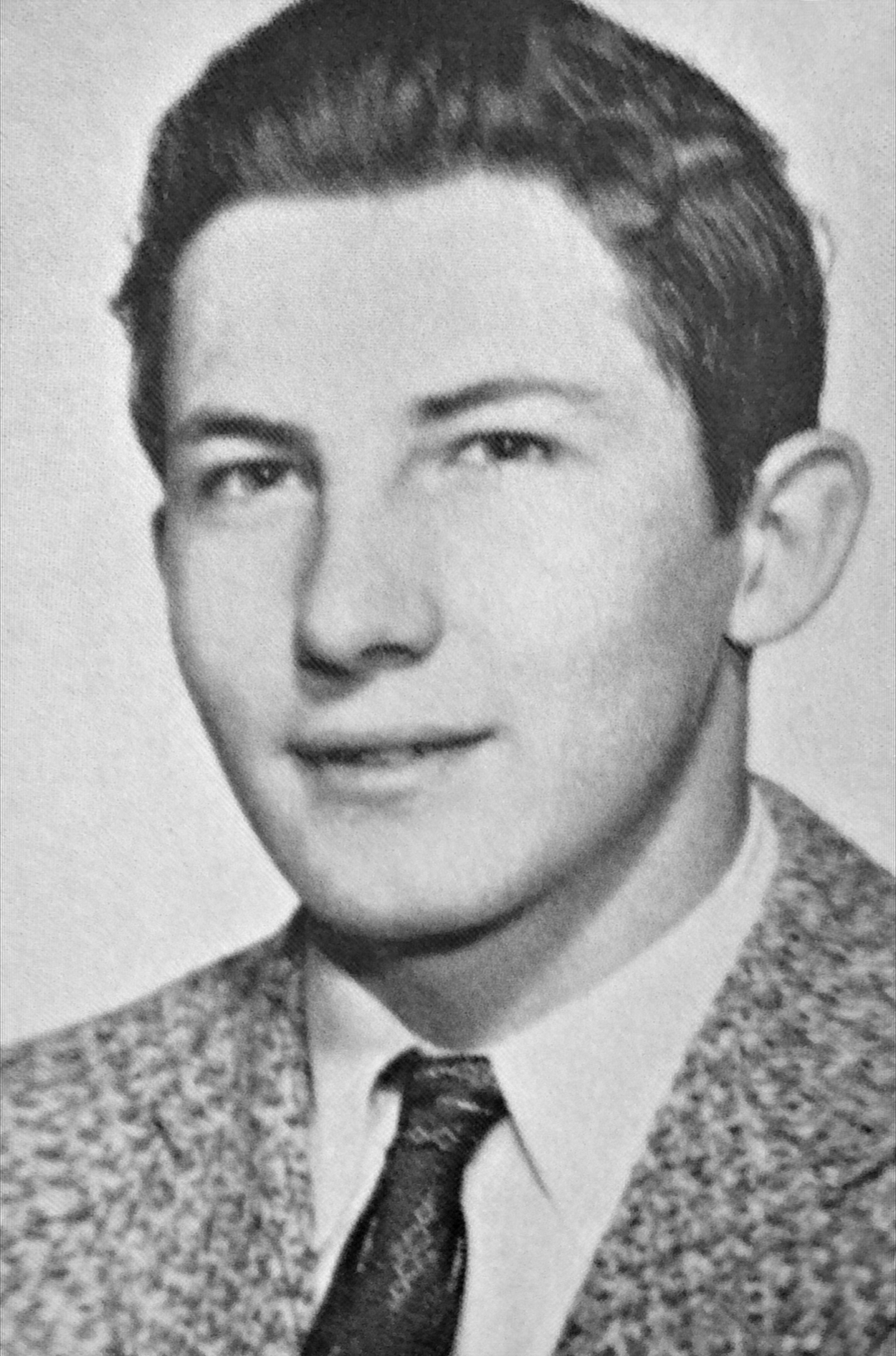
Ames's portrait in the 1958 McLean High School yearbook

Aldrich Hazen ("Rick") Ames was born in River Falls, Wisconsin, on May 26, 1941, to Carleton Cecil Ames and Rachel Ames (née Aldrich). His father was a lecturer at the Wisconsin State College–River Falls, and his mother a high school English teacher. Aldrich was the eldest of three children and the only son. In 1952, his father began working with the Central Intelligence Agency's Directorate of Operations in Langley, Virginia. The following year, in 1953, his father was posted to Burma for three years, and the family relocated there. Carleton received a "particularly negative performance appraisal" in part because of serious alcoholism, and spent the remainder of his career at CIA headquarters in Langley.

Ames attended McLean High School in McLean, Virginia. Beginning in 1957, following his sophomore year, he worked for the CIA for three summers as a low-ranking GS-3 records analyst as part of a program to give temporary jobs to children of CIA employees. Ames was responsible for marking classified documents for filing as well as making fake money to be used in training programs for "the Farm", where CIA trainees began. Two years later, in 1959, Ames entered the University of Chicago, where he planned to study foreign cultures and history. His "long-time passion" for theater, however, resulted in failing grades, and he did not finish his second year.

== CIA career ==
Ames returned to the CIA during the summer of 1960 as a laborer and painter. He then became an assistant technical director at a Chicago theater until February 1962. Returning to the Washington metropolitan area, Ames took full-time employment at the CIA doing the same sort of clerical jobs he had performed in high school. While taking his first polygraph examination, Ames claimed to have committed a crime, which was considered no probability of deception. When asked to elaborate on the offense, Ames confessed that he and a friend not affiliated with CIA, while drunk, stole a delivery boy's bicycle and went joyriding; this confession had not been considered grave enough to disqualify Ames from a security clearance.

Five years after beginning his work for the CIA, Ames completed a bachelor's degree in history at the George Washington University in Washington, D.C. He did not plan to have a career with the agency, but after attaining the grade of GS-7 and receiving good performance appraisals, he was accepted into the Career Trainee Program despite several alcohol-related brushes with the police. In 1969, Ames married a fellow CIA officer, Nancy Segebarth, whom he had met in the Career Trainee Program.

Ames was assigned to Ankara, Turkey, and Nancy then resigned from the CIA because of a rule that prohibited married partners from working from the same office. Ames's job in Turkey was to target Soviet intelligence officers for recruitment. He succeeded in infiltrating the communist Dev-Genç organization through a roommate of student activist Deniz Gezmiş and a beauty pageant contestant whose boyfriend was participating in a movement to overthrow the Turkish government. In spite of this success, Ames's performance was rated only "satisfactory". His superiors considered the spies recruited to be of sufficient value, but a remark was made that Ames was "unsuited for field work and it is recommended he spend the remainder of his career at CIA headquarters". Discouraged by the critical assessment, Ames considered resigning from the agency.

In 1972, Ames returned to CIA headquarters, where he spent the next four years in the Soviet-East European (SE) Division, where he was responsible for managing assets and his skills were better utilized. His performance reviews were "generally enthusiastic". Nevertheless, his excessive drinking was noted, and two "eyes only" memoranda were placed in his file.

In 1976, Ames was assigned to New York City, where he handled two important Soviet assets: Sergey Fedorenko, a nuclear weapons expert with the Soviet mission to United Nations Headquarters, whose name Ames would later give to the KGB; and Arkady Shevchenko, a United Nations under-secretary-general who in 1978, with Ames's help, became the highest-ranking Soviet official to defect to the West. Ames's performance was rated excellent, and he received several promotions and bonuses, being ranked above most operations officers in his pay grade. However, his tendency to procrastinate in submissions of financial accounting was noted. His inattention to detail also led him to commit two security violations, including once leaving a briefcase containing classified operational materials on the New York City Subway, which the FBI recovered and determined as being uncompromised. Ames later said he received a verbal reprimand but no documentation of the matter.

In 1981, Ames accepted a posting to Mexico City while his wife remained in New York City. His evaluations in Mexico were mediocre at best, and he engaged in at least three extramarital affairs. In October 1982, Ames began an affair with María del Rosario Casas Dupuy, a cultural attaché in the Colombian embassy and a CIA informant. He married her in 1985, and fathered a son with her, Paul Ames, who was born in 1989. Despite CIA regulations, Ames had not reported his relationship with a foreign national to his superiors, even though some of his colleagues were aware of it. His lackluster performance reviews were again partly the result of his heavy drinking. At a diplomatic reception in Mexico City, Ames got into a loud, drunken argument with a Cuban official that "caused alarm" among his superiors.

In September 1983, Ames was transferred back to the Southeast Asia division at CIA headquarters. His reassignment placed him "in the most sensitive element" of the Department of Operations, which was responsible for Soviet counterintelligence. Ames had access to all CIA plans and operations against the KGB and the GRU, Soviet military intelligence. In October, he formally separated from Nancy; in November, he submitted an "outside activity" report to the CIA, noting his romantic relationship with Rosario. Ames later remarked that Nancy made little fuss about the affair and quickly agreed to a divorce, but made it well known she was keeping most of their joint assets. The divorce was finalized on August 1, 1985, and nine days later he married Rosario.

As part of the divorce settlement, Ames agreed to pay the debts that they had accrued and provide Nancy monthly support for three and a half years, totaling approximately $46,000 ($117,000 in 2025). Ames thought the divorce might bankrupt him, and later said that this financial pressure was what had first led him to consider spying for the Soviets. Rosario had also proven to be a heavy spender, going on shopping sprees and phoning her family in Colombia at a cost of $5,000 a month. After his arrest, the FBI discovered 60 purses in the Ames' house, more than five hundred pairs of shoes, 165 unopened boxes of pantyhose and multiple designer dresses, noting "at least a dozen looked like they were not yet worn". Also discovered were six Rolex watches.

=== Espionage ===
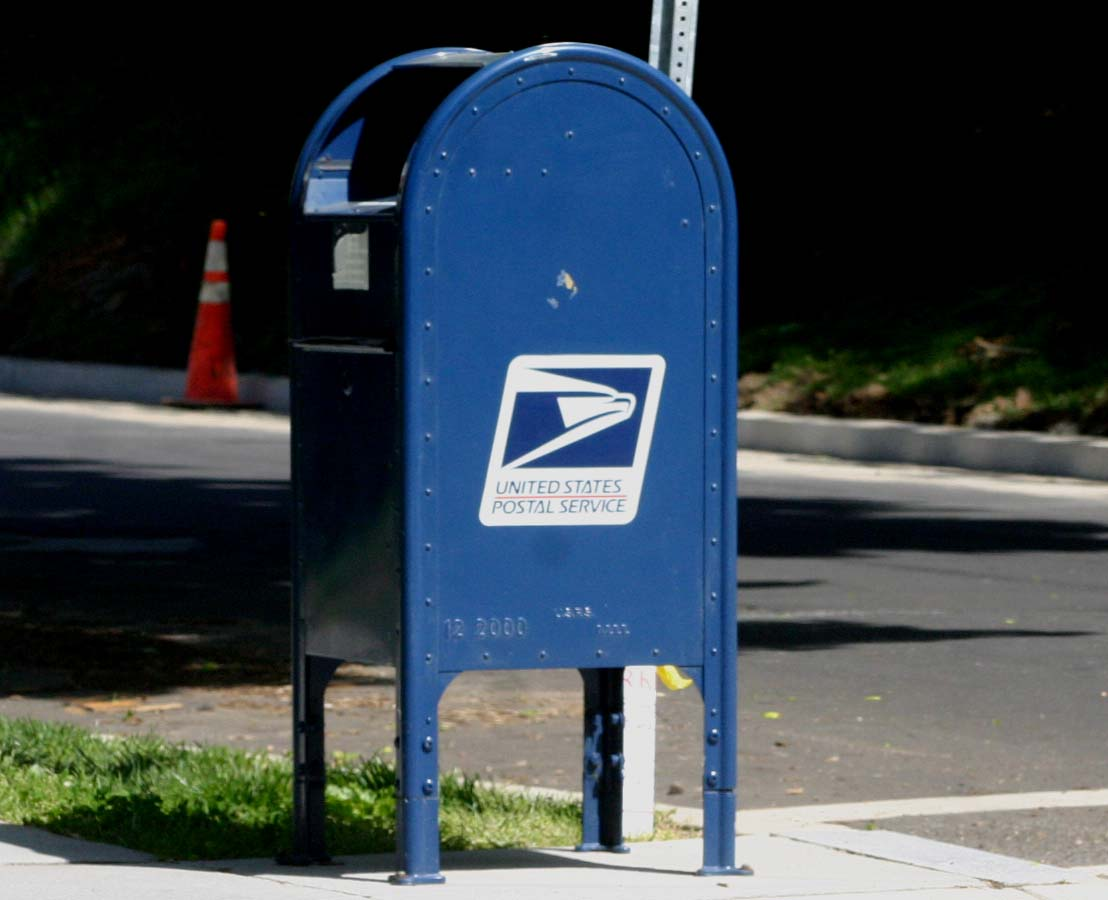
Replacement of the mailbox used by Ames; a horizontal chalk mark above the USPS logo at 37th and R Streets, Washington, D.C., was a signal that a meeting with the Soviets was needed. The original mailbox is now housed in the International Spy Museum.

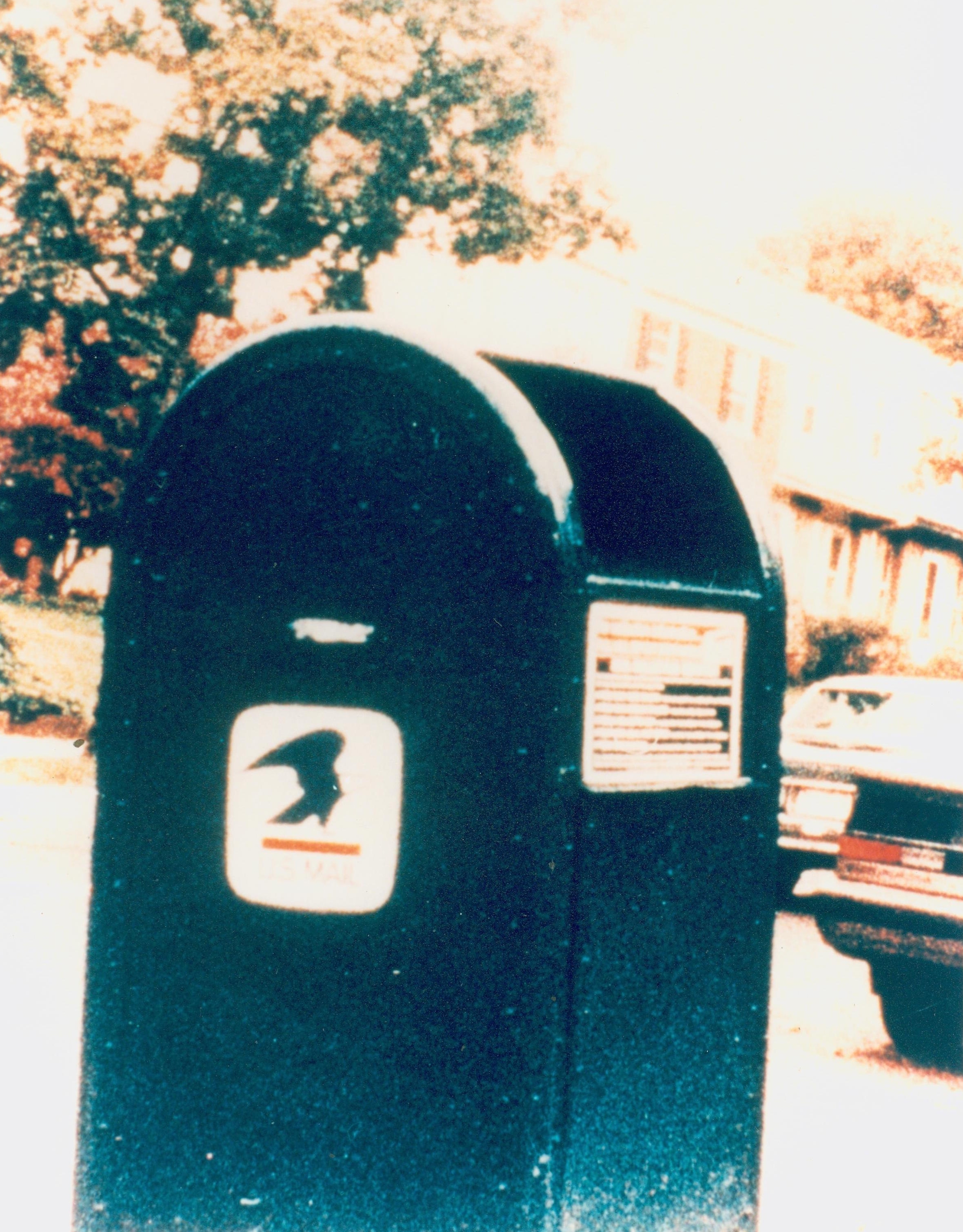
FBI photo of the mailbox featuring the horizontal chalk mark placed by Ames on October 13, 1993, to arrange a meeting with his Russian intelligence handlers.

Ames routinely assisted another CIA office that assessed Soviet embassy officials as potential intelligence assets. As part of this responsibility, and with the knowledge of both the CIA and the FBI, Ames began making contacts within the Soviet embassy.

In April 1985, Ames's espionage on behalf of the Soviet Union began. He provided information to the Soviets on two CIA agents that he believed was "essentially valueless" but would establish his credentials as a CIA insider. In exchange for it, he asked for $50,000, which the Soviets quickly paid. Ames later claimed that he had not prepared for more than the initial "con game" to satisfy his immediate indebtedness, but having "crossed a line" he "could never step back".

Ames soon identified more than ten top-level CIA and FBI sources who were reporting on Soviet activities. Not only did Ames believe that there was "as much money as [he] could ever use" in betraying these intelligence assets, but their elimination would also reduce the chance of his own espionage being discovered. The CIA's network of Soviet-bloc agents began disappearing at an alarming rate, including double agents Gennady Varenik and Dmitri Polyakov. The CIA realized something was wrong but was reluctant to consider the possibility of a mole within their agency. Initial investigations focused on possible breaches caused by Soviet bugs or a code that had been broken.

The CIA initially blamed asset losses on another former CIA agent, Edward Lee Howard, who had also been passing information to the Soviets. But when the agency lost three other important assets about whom Howard could not have known anything, it was clear that the arrests and resulting executions were the result of information provided by another source. One CIA officer said that the Soviets "were wrapping up our cases with reckless abandon", which was highly unusual because the "prevailing wisdom among the Agency's professional 'spy catchers'" was that suddenly eliminating all the assets known to the mole would put him in danger. In fact, Ames's KGB handlers had apologized to him, saying they disagreed with that course of action, but that the decision to immediately eliminate all American assets had been made at the highest political levels.

Meanwhile, Ames continued to meet openly with his contact at the Soviet embassy, Sergey Dmitriyevich Chuvakhin. For a time, Ames summarized for the CIA and FBI the progress of what he portrayed as an attempt to recruit Chuvakhin. Ames received $20,000 to $50,000 every time the two had lunch. Ultimately, Ames received $4.6 million (equivalent to $13.8 million in 2025) from the Soviets, which allowed him to enjoy a lifestyle well beyond the means of a CIA officer. In August 1985, when Ames's divorce became final, he immediately married Rosario Casas Dupuy. Understanding that his new wealth would raise eyebrows, he developed a cover story that his prosperity was the result of money given to him by his Colombian wife's wealthy family. Ames wired considerable amounts of his espionage payments to his new in-laws in Bogotá to help improve their impoverished status.

In mid-May 1985, someone apparently reported to the Soviets that Oleg Gordievsky, their chief of station in London, was sending secrets to MI6, which he had been doing, under great secrecy, for 11 years. On May 17, 1985, Gordievsky was recalled to Moscow, where he was drugged and interrogated about his alleged communications with MI6. There was great suspicion that Ames had reported Gordievsky's activity to Soviet counterintelligence. In June 1994, however, The Washington Post stated that "After six weeks of questioning Ames ... the FBI and CIA remain baffled about whether Ames or someone else first warned the Soviets about Gordievsky". An FBI agent reported that Ames had not advised the Soviets about Gordievsky until June 13, 1985. By that time, the spy was under KGB surveillance, although he had not been charged with treason as of July 19, 1985, when MI6 agents began to exfiltrate him to Britain.

In 1986, following the loss of several CIA assets, Ames told the KGB that he feared he would be a suspect. The KGB threw U.S. investigators off Ames's trail by constructing an elaborate diversion, in which a Soviet case officer told a CIA contact that the mole was stationed at Warrenton Training Center (WTC), a secret CIA communications facility in Warrenton, Virginia. Mole hunters investigated ninety employees at WTC for almost a year and came up with ten suspects, although the lead investigator noted that "there are so many problem personalities that no one stands out".

In 1986, Ames was posted to Rome, where his performance once again ranged from mediocre to poor and again included evidence of his problematic drinking. Regardless, from 1990 to 1991, he was reassigned to the CIA's Counterintelligence Center Analysis Group, which provided him with access to "extremely sensitive data", including information on American double agents.

Later, after he defected, Gordievsky spoke highly of the information that Ames had provided to the KGB, stating that "the significance of Ames was huge" and that the Soviets were impressed with the "quality and quantity" of secrets that he had delivered.

=== CIA response ===
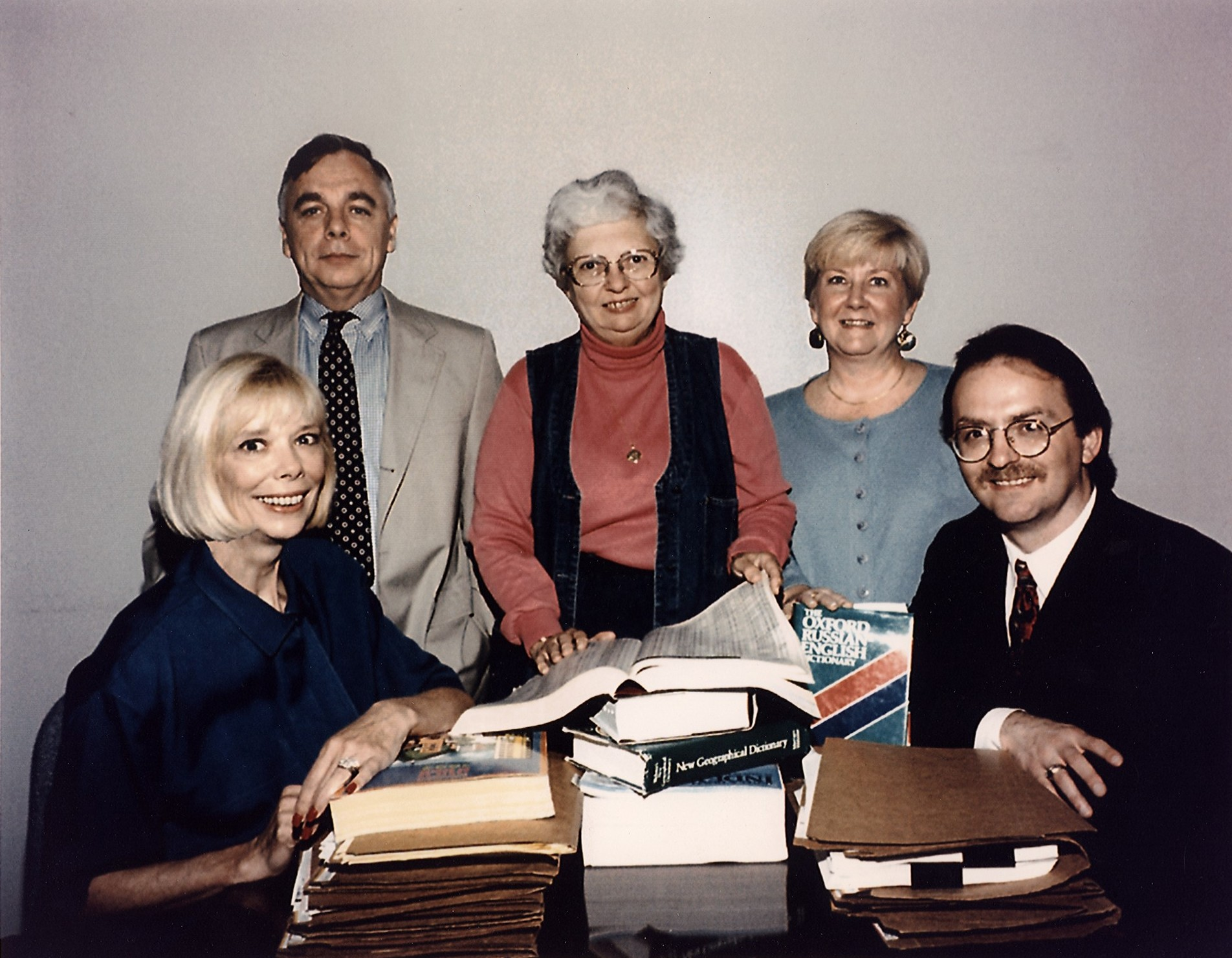
The CIA mole hunt team, c. 1990. Left to right: Sandy Grimes, Paul Redmond, Jeanne Vertefeuille, Diana Worthen, and Dan Payne.

In late 1986, the CIA assembled a team to investigate the source of the leaks. Led by Paul Redmond, and including Jeanne Vertefeuille, Sandra Grimes, Diana Worthen, and Dan Payne, the team examined the possibility that the KGB had bugged the agency, intercepted its communications, or had a mole in place. By 1990, the CIA was certain that there was a mole in the agency, but was unable to identify the exact source. Recruitment of new Soviet agents was brought to a near halt, since the agency feared it could not protect its current assets.

Prior to that, in November 1989, a fellow employee reported that Ames seemed to be enjoying a lifestyle well beyond the means of a CIA officer, and that his wife's family was less wealthy than he had claimed. Worthen, one of the members of the mole hunt team, had known Rosario prior to her marriage and had met with her one day to discuss installing drapes in the Ames residence. Worthen had recently installed drapes in her own home and knew they could be expensive. She asked which room to concentrate on first, to which Rosario laughed and said, "Do not worry about the price, we are going to have the whole house done at once!". Worthen also knew that Rosario's parents had little money, and a CIA contact in Bogotá observed that her family was now well-off. Nevertheless, the CIA moved slowly. When the investigator assigned to look at Ames's finances began a two-month training course, no one immediately replaced him. Investigators were also diverted by a false story from a CIA officer abroad who claimed that the Soviets had penetrated the CIA with an employee born in the USSR (Ames was born in River Falls, Wisconsin).

In 1986 and 1991, Ames passed two polygraph examinations while spying for the Soviet Union. He was initially "terrified" at the prospect of taking the test but was advised by the KGB "to just relax". Ames's test demonstrated deceptive answers to some questions, but the examiners passed him. In the later opinion of the CIA, this was because the examiners were "overly friendly" and therefore did not induce the proper physiological response.

The CIA finally focused on Ames after co-workers noted his sharper personal appearance, including:

- Cosmetic dentistry: Ames's teeth, which were yellowed as a result of heavy smoking, had been capped
- Attire: Ames had been known for "bargain basement" attire, but suddenly changed to wearing tailor-made suits that not even his superiors could afford

The CIA also realized that, despite Ames's annual salary of $60,000, he could afford:

- A $540,000 ($1.22 million in 2025) house in Arlington County, Virginia, which he paid for in cash
- A $50,000 Jaguar XJ-6 luxury car
- Home remodeling and redecoration costs of $99,000
- Monthly phone bills exceeding $5,000, mostly calls by Ames's wife to her family in Colombia
- Servants from the Philippines, whose travel to and from the United States was paid for by Ames
- Premium credit cards, on which the minimum monthly payment exceeded his monthly salary

A search warrant of the Ames residence during the arrest also revealed at least two dozen designer dresses, some of which looked like they had yet to be worn, 165 pairs of pantyhose and six Rolex watches. A picture of a Russian dacha by a lake was also found, which was provided by the Russians as payment for espionage.

== Arrest ==
In March 1993, the CIA and FBI began an intensive investigation of Ames that included electronic surveillance, combing through his trash, and installing a monitor in his car to track his movements. From November 1993 until his arrest, Ames was kept under virtually constant physical surveillance. In early 1994, when he was scheduled to attend a conference in Moscow, the FBI believed it could wait no longer, and he and his wife were arrested on February 21. February 21st fell on President's Day, a national holiday and the Ameses were home. Ames was drawn out through a call from his supervisor that the team was needed for an emergency meeting. Shortly after driving onto the street, Ames was pulled over in an apparent traffic stop. At his arrest, Ames told officers, "You're making a big mistake! You must have the wrong man!". Inside the Ames residence, an FBI agent informed Rosario in Spanish that she was also being arrested.

On February 22, 1994, the Department of Justice formally charged Ames and his wife in the U.S. District Court for the Eastern District of Virginia with spying for the USSR and subsequently the Russian Federation. Charges were also prepared for tax evasion, as no money Russia paid was declared. Ames filed false joint income tax returns for fiscal years 1985–1994. Ames' defense that illegal income did not fall under purview of earned income was rejected at his trial. Ames pleaded guilty, and on April 28 U.S. district judge Claude M. Hilton sentenced him to life imprisonment without the possibility of parole. As part of Ames's plea bargain, his wife received a lesser sentence of five years for tax evasion and conspiracy to commit espionage.

In court, Ames confessed that he had compromised "virtually all Soviet agents of the CIA and other American and foreign services known to me" and had provided the USSR and Russia with a "huge quantity of information on United States foreign, defense and security policies". It is estimated that information Ames provided to the Soviets led to the compromise of at least 100 American intelligence operations and the execution of at least ten sources. Ames's betrayal of CIA methods also allowed the KGB to use "controlled agents" to feed the U.S. both genuine intelligence and disinformation from 1986 to 1993. Some of this "feed material" was incorporated into CIA intelligence reports, several of which even reached three U.S. presidents.

Ames admitted he was unprepared for getting arrested by the FBI but was afraid of Soviet defectors, saying, "Virtually every American who has been jailed in connection with espionage has been fingered by a Soviet source". Additionally, when asked about the polygraph tests, Ames said, "There's no special magic. Confidence is what does it. Confidence and a friendly relationship with the examiner. Rapport, where you smile and you make him think that you like him. Making the examiner believe that the exam has no importance to you seals the deal."

== Sentence and death ==
Ames was incarcerated by the Federal Bureau of Prisons as prisoner #40087-083 and served his life sentence at the maximum-security United States Penitentiary, Allenwood, in White Deer, Pennsylvania, at the medium-security Federal Correctional Institution (FCI) in Terre Haute, Indiana, and at the Federal Correctional Institution (FCI) near Cumberland, Maryland.

The CIA was criticized for not focusing on Ames sooner, given the obvious increase in his standard of living. There was a "huge uproar" in Congress when CIA Director James Woolsey decided that no one in the agency would be dismissed or demoted in relation to Ames's espionage. "Some have clamored for heads to roll in order that we could say that heads have rolled," Woolsey declared. "Sorry, that's not my way." Woolsey later resigned under pressure.

Ames's attorney, Plato Cacheris, threatened to litigate the legality of the FBI's searches and seizures in Ames's home and office without conventional search warrants, although Ames's guilty plea made the threat moot. Congress then passed a new law that granted specific power to the Foreign Intelligence Surveillance Court to authorize such searches. Ames was ineligible for the death penalty since his acts of espionage all took place before the 1994 Federal Death Penalty Act, which fully reinstated capital punishment on the federal level.

On January 5, 2026, Ames died at the Federal Correctional Institution, Cumberland, at the age of 84. His death was reported in a federal prisoner database and confirmed by a government spokesperson, who also informed the press of where he had died.

== CIA sources compromised ==
- Vitaly Yurchenko was a KGB officer in the Fifth Department of Directorate K, "the highest-ranking KGB officer ever to defect to the United States". In August 1985, he defected to the U.S. via Rome, only to return to the Soviet Union three months later. Ames was privy to all information that Yurchenko gave to the CIA and was able to transmit it to the KGB, which allowed easy cover-ups of lost information. Upon his return to the Soviet Union, Yurchenko was reassigned to a desk job within the FCD as a reward for helping to keep Ames's spying a secret.
- Major General Dmitri Polyakov was a high-ranking figure in the GRU who gave information to the CIA from the early 1960s until his retirement in 1980. He was executed in 1988 after Ames exposed him. Polyakov was probably the most valuable asset compromised by Ames. One CIA official said of Polyakov: "He didn't do this for money. He insisted on staying in place to help us."
- Colonel Oleg Gordievsky was the head of the London rezidentura (station) and spied for MI6. Ames handed over information about Gordievsky that positively identified him as a double agent, although Gordievsky managed to escape to the Finnish border, where he was extracted to the United Kingdom via Norway by MI6.
- Adolf Tolkachev was an electrical engineer who was one of the chief designers at the Phazotron company, which produces military radars and avionics. Tolkachev passed information to the CIA between 1979 and 1985, compromising multiple radar and missile secrets, as well as turning over classified information on avionics. He was arrested in 1985 after being compromised by both Ames and Edward Lee Howard, and was executed in 1986.
- Valery Martynov was a Line X (Technical & Scientific Intelligence) officer at the Washington rezidentura. He revealed the identities of fifty Soviet intelligence officers operating from the embassy and technical and scientific targets that the KGB had penetrated. After being identified by Ames, he was tapped by the KGB to escort Yurchenko to Moscow; however, this was a ruse. Martynov was arrested, interrogated, and charged with espionage upon his return. He was executed in 1987.
- Major Sergei Motorin was a Line PR (political intelligence) officer at the Washington rezidentura, whom the FBI tried to blackmail into spying for the Americans. He eventually cooperated for his own reasons. Motorin was one of two moles at the rezidentura betrayed by Ames and was executed in 1988.
- Colonel Leonid Poleshchuk was a Line KR (counterintelligence) agent in Nigeria, also betrayed by Ames. His arrest was attributed to a chance encounter in which KGB agents had observed a CIA agent loading a dead drop. After some time, Poleshchuk was seen removing the contents. He was eventually tried and executed.
- Sergey Fedorenko was a nuclear weapons expert assigned to the Soviet delegation to the United Nations. In 1977, Ames was assigned to handle him, and Fedorenko provided information about the Soviet missile program to Ames. The two men became good friends, hugging when Fedorenko was about to return to Moscow. "We had become close friends", said Ames. "We trusted each other completely." Ames was initially hesitant to inform on Fedorenko, but soon after handing over the majority of the information, he decided to betray him to "do a good job" for the KGB. Back in the USSR, Fedorenko used political connections to get himself out of trouble. Years later, Fedorenko met his friend Ames for an emotional reunion over lunch and promised to move to the U.S. for good. Ames promised to help. Shortly after the lunch, Ames betrayed him to the KGB for a second time. Fedorenko escaped arrest, defected, and as of 2008 was living in Rhode Island.
- In a 2004 interview with Howard Phillips Hart, who was the CIA Station Chief of Bonn in the late 1980s, it was revealed that in 1988, Ames also betrayed a Mikoyan Gurevich Design Bureau engineer who had been working with the CIA for fourteen years and had provided complete technical, test, and research data on all of the Soviet Union's fighter jets. According to Hart, his information "allowed the US Government to prevent the skies from being blacked out by Soviet bombers, saved us billions of dollars ... since we knew precisely what they could do".

Tennent H. Bagley, a high-level CIA counterintelligence officer and Yuri Nosenko's long-term case officer, said in a follow-up to his 2007 Yale University Press book, Spy Wars: Moles, Mysteries and Deadly Games, that "a KGB veteran even thought that 'most' of the CIA spies inside the KGB who were betrayed by CIA traitor Aldrich Ames in 1985 were in fact loyal [KGB] staffers pretending to help the CIA". Bagley's source for his statement was "Aleksandr Kouzminov, Biological Espionage: Special Operations in the Soviet and Russian Foreign Intelligence Services in the West, (London: Greenhill Books, 2005), p. 59."

In Spy Wars itself, Bagley goes into great detail explaining why he believed Vitaly Yurchenko, whom Ames allegedly betrayed, was a Kremlin-loyal false defector all along.

== Aldrich Ames and Jonathan Pollard ==
Rafi Eitan, the Israeli handler of Jonathan Pollard, alleged that Pollard was blamed for some of Ames's crimes. Pollard was convicted of passing classified information to Israel in 1987 and served 30 years in prison. Eitan stated that Pollard never exposed American agents in the Soviet Union or elsewhere, and that he believed Ames tried to blame Pollard to clear himself of suspicion. Interviewed by Ronen Bergman, Eitan said, "I have no doubt that had Pollard been tried today, in light of what is known about Ames and other agents who were exposed, he would have received a much lighter sentence."
