= Jeanne Vertefeuille =

CIA counter-mole officer involved in the capture of Aldrich Ames

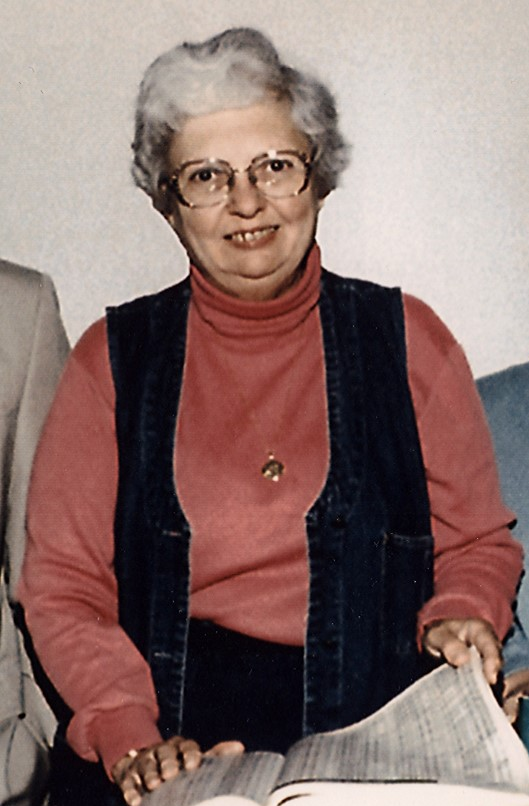
- Vertefeuille in the 1990s
- Born: December 23, 1932; New Haven, Connecticut, U.S.
- Died: December 29, 2012 (aged 80); Reston, Virginia, U.S.
- Education: Bachelor's degree, history, University of Connecticut, 1954
- Occupation: Intelligence Officer
- Years active: 1954–1992 (active); 1992–2012 (reserve)
- Employer: CIA
- Known for: Investigation which uncovered the actions of Aldrich Ames

Jeanne Ruth Vertefeuille (December 23, 1932 – December 29, 2012) was a CIA officer who participated in a small team that investigated and uncovered the actions of Aldrich Ames, a notorious Cold War spy.

== Early life ==
Born in New Haven, Connecticut, on December 23, 1932, Vertefeuille earned a bachelor's degree in history from the University of Connecticut in 1954, where she also learned German and French. She began her career as a typist for the Agency in 1954 and obtained promotions and expertise on the Soviet Union over several decades, serving in Ethiopia, Finland, and the Netherlands.

== Career ==
In 1976, Vertefeuille wrote ''The GRU Today'', which was a study on the operations of the GRU, the Soviet Union's foreign military intelligence organisation.

She was made the lead investigator of a small team looking at the high rate of Soviet double agent disappearances in 1986. As it became more clear to the team that there could be a mole in the organization, Vertefeuille worked to keep the team small and focused to minimize the chances of the mole escaping before an arrest could be made. Over the course of eight years, this investigation led her to Ames's involvement in the disappearances – he had exposed them in exchange for millions of dollars, leading to at least eight executions. The investigation was fraught with difficulty, but the team began to uncover his treachery in 1989 when it was found that had bought luxury cars and a house, items beyond the salary of a typical CIA agent. The case was not cracked until 1991, when Vertefeuille and her team correlated Ames's meeting times with large deposits in his bank account. She officially retired in 1992 but continued to work as a contractor until a few months before her death in 2012. Ames was arrested with the involvement of the FBI on February 21, 1994. Prior to his arrest, Ames had told the KGB that Vertefeuille had the requisite access to be framed instead.

== Illness and death ==
Throughout her career, Vertefeuille was known for her intense personal privacy and solitary nature. She died of brain cancer at the age of 80.

According to Peter Earnest, executive director (emeritus) of the International Spy Museum in Washington, D.C., Vertefeuille's "friend, in her final days, was, of course, Sandy Grimes. They had been friends for years, very close friends, and very close teammates."

== Legacy ==
In 1998, Ames' story was dramatized in the TV movie Aldrich Ames: Traitor Within, starring Joan Plowright as Vertefeuille.

In 2014, ABC aired The Assets, an eight-part American drama television miniseries based on Circle of Treason.
