= Sandra Grimes =

American intelligence agent (1945–2025)

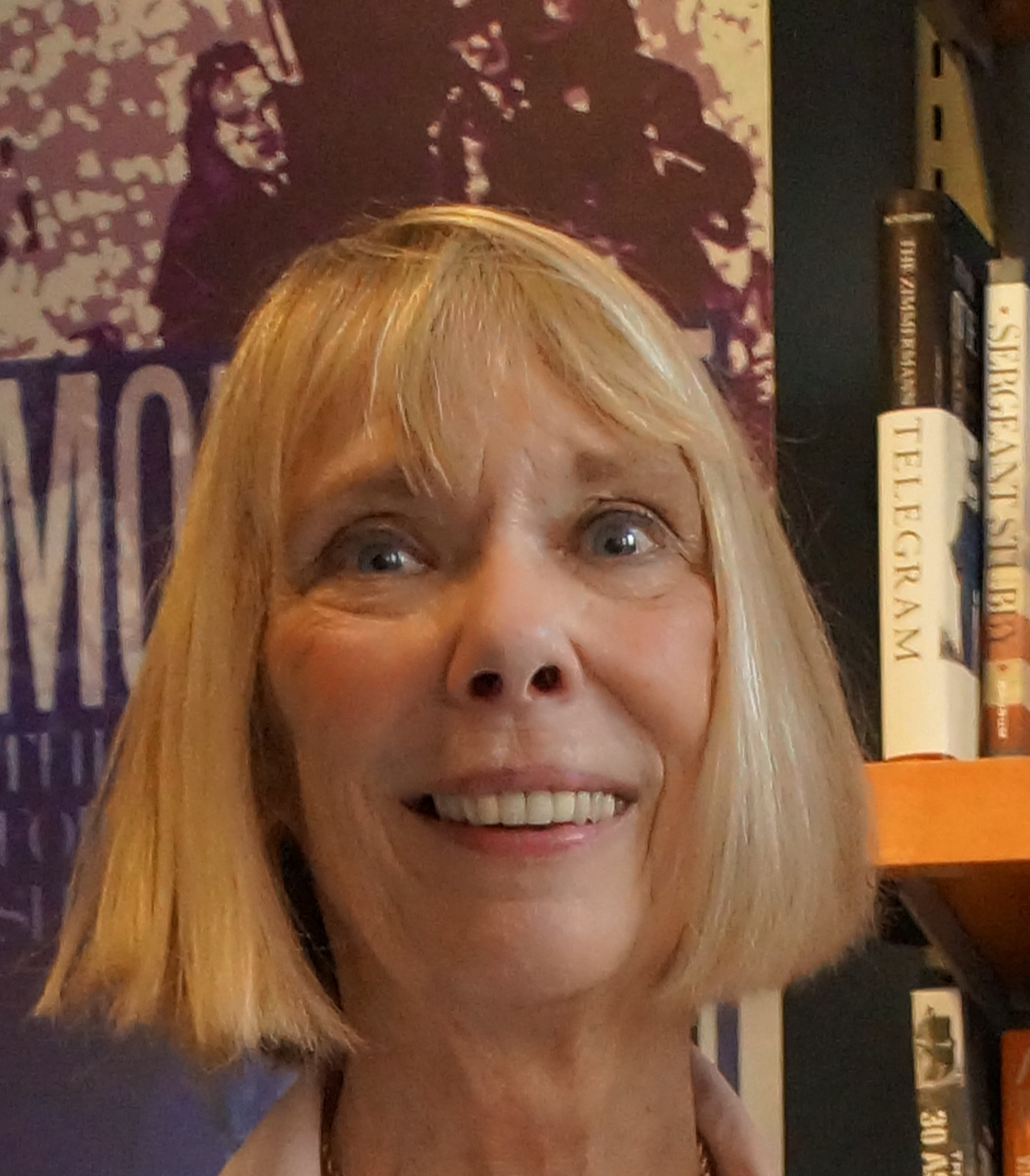
- Grimes in 2016
- Born: Sandra Joyce Venable; August 10, 1945; Poughkeepsie, New York, U.S.
- Died: July 25, 2025 (aged 79); Great Falls, Virginia, U.S.
- Education: University of Washington
- Occupation: CIA operative (1966–1993)
- Spouse: Gary Grimes
- Children: 2

Sandra Joyce Grimes (August 10, 1945 – July 25, 2025) was an American intelligence agent with the Central Intelligence Agency. A CIA officer, she participated in a small team that investigated and uncovered the actions of Aldrich Ames, a United States CIA counterintelligence officer who was subsequently convicted of spying for the Soviet Union.

== Early life ==
Grimes was born Sandra Joyce Venable on August 10, 1945, in Poughkeepsie, New York, to Mary (née Twitty) and Isaac Venable, who met in Oak Ridge, Tennessee, and worked together on the Manhattan Project. She went to school in Los Alamos, New Mexico, then left and did the rest of her schooling in Denver, Colorado. While in high school she enrolled in a course in Russian, in which she excelled and gave her the encouragement to later major in Russian language at the University of Washington in Seattle. She was married to Gary Grimes for 56 years and had two daughters.

== CIA career and Aldrich Ames ==
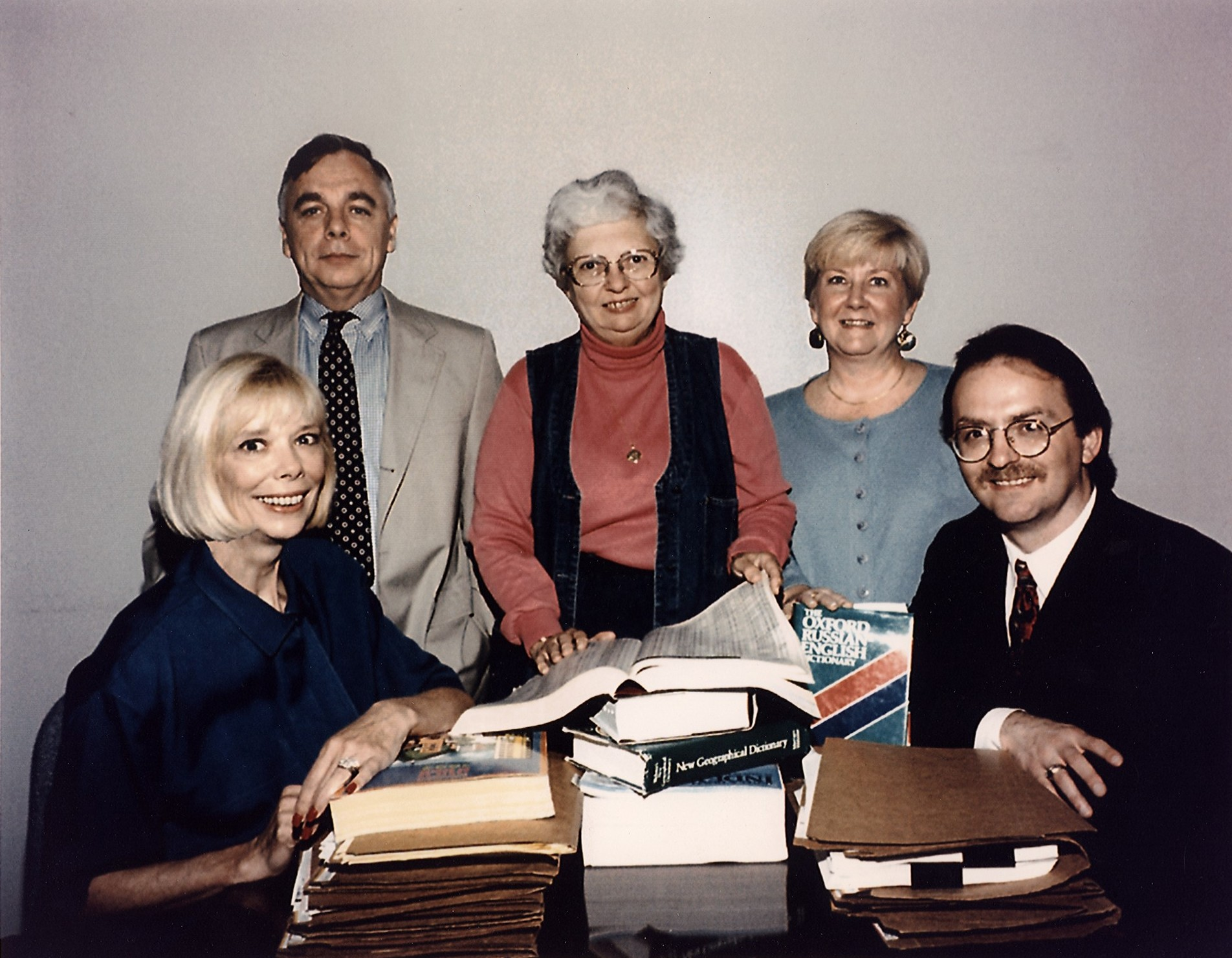
The Central Intelligence Agency team that discovered Soviet mole Aldrich Ames. From left to right: Sandy Grimes, Paul Redmond, Jeanne Vertefeuille, Diana Worthen, Dan Payne.

In October 1966, a friend informed Grimes that a CIA recruiter was on campus, and told her she "would make a perfect spy." She subsequently interviewed with the CIA, and was hired as a GS-06 Intelligence Assistant, a job classification which required that she obtain security and medical clearances before being granted unrestricted access to the potentially sensitive documentation she would be seeing. When she reported for duty at the Ames building in Rosslyn, Virginia, she and her co-workers became clerical employees.

Grimes's first job was working in the Soviet Bloc Division of the Directorate of Operations, which included the intelligence from then-GRU Colonel Dmitri Fedorovich Polyakov. She trained herself to become familiar with Soviet intelligence services, during which she used index cards to track counterintelligence and positive intelligence.

In Fall 1968, Grimes attended operations training and met SE Division expert Dick Kovich. In 1970, she eventually was granted an interview for conversion to professional status and afterward worked her way up and was given the duty of replacing a senior intelligence analyst in the Branch. She later became a Soviet and Eastern European Division officer and remained with their counterintelligence group for eleven years, holding various titles and positions. It was through this experience that she gained knowledge of the KGB and the GRU. During this time. Grimes worked or assisted in cases which included Aleksey Isidorovich Kulak and Leonid Georgiyevich Poleshchuk.

In the late 1970s, through an organizational change in the CI group, she met Jeanne Vertefeuille. Together with Faith McCoy, Grimes and Vertefeuille made a proposal to create two branches in the CI group, both of which to handle CI dissemination and production in a specific geographical region. One would deal with the Soviet bloc and the other the Eastern European bloc. Eventually, the two branches merged, where Vertefeuille was the chief and Grimes became the Soviet section chief.

In 1981, after 14 years in CI, Grimes moved to the Career Management Staff after a change in feelings.

In early 1983, she eventually moved on to becoming deputy chief of external operations in Africa and two weeks later became acting chief. In early 1984, Grimes was appointed permanent Chief of SE External Operations for Africa.

After the arrest of then General Leonid Poleshchuk on October 2, 1985, in January 1986, Grimes was part of the attempt to stop CIA assets from being exposed, which was an extraordinary "back room" security procedure. This role was in addition to Grimes's role of Chief of SE External Operations for Africa.

She was eventually brought into a CIA operation in Bonn. An anonymous write-in, involving a person named Mister. X, mentioned that the Soviet sources of the CIA were compromised due to a penetration of the CIA communications. The author demanded $50,000 in a cache or dead drop in East Berlin. In March 1987, Grimes was transferred from her position in Africa and was assigned to the Moscow Task Force. Moscow Embassy Marine guards Arnold Bracy and Clayton Lonetree allowed the KGB entry to the secure areas within the U.S. Embassy.

In 1989, Grimes moved from being Chief of the Production Branch to a part-time position in the Special Projects Section. In early 1991, she was working on GTPROLOGUE when she was offered the assignment to investigate the 1985 loss of Polyakov and others.

During a joint mole-hunt, Grimes was a member of the team who made the first breakthrough in 1992 that ultimately revealed Ames was the mole. She correlated times that Ames met with Sergey Dmitriyevich Chuvakhin, his KGB contact, with times that he made large bank deposits in 1985 and 1986. Though Grimes suspected early on that Ames was the mole, the deposits put it beyond any doubt that Ames was, as she told her colleagues, "a goddamn Russian spy." She took Ames' crimes personally, since Poylakov had been one of the assets burned by Ames. In early 1993, Grimes resigned from the CIA.

== Legacy ==
In 2012, Circle of Treason: A CIA Account of Traitor Aldrich Ames and the Men He Betrayed, a book co-authored by Grimes and Vertefeuille, was published by the Naval Institute Press. Vertefeuille subsequently died from brain cancer at the age of 80 on 29 December of that same year. According to Peter Earnest, executive director (emeritus) of the International Spy Museum in Washington, DC, Vertefeuille's "friend, in her final days, was, of course, Sandy Grimes. They had been friends for years, very close friends, and very close teammates."

In 2014, ABC aired The Assets, an eight-part American drama television miniseries based on Circle of Treason.

=== Death ===
Grimes died from complications of Alzheimer's disease in Great Falls, Virginia, on July 25, 2025, at age 79.
