= Plato Cacheris =

American lawyer (1929–2019)

- Born: May 22, 1929; Pittsburgh, Pennsylvania, U.S.
- Died: September 26, 2019 (aged 90); Alexandria, Virginia, U.S.
- Education: Georgetown University
- Occupation: Lawyer

Plato Cacheris (May 22, 1929 – September 26, 2019) was an American lawyer. He was known as one of Washington D.C.'s premier defense lawyers, known especially for representing people involved in political scandals.

== Early life ==
Cacheris was the son of a Greek immigrant family. He grew up in Washington, D.C., and Pittsburgh, Pennsylvania. His father co-owned a chain of restaurants including the historic downtown restaurant The Waffle Shop in Washington, D.C. In 1951, he joined the U.S. Marine Corps as an officer candidate, but left in 1953 to enter law school. Cacheris graduated from the Edmund A. Walsh School of Foreign Service at Georgetown University and received his Juris Doctor from the Georgetown University Law Center in 1956. He died of pneumonia in Alexandria, Virginia, on the afternoon of September 26, 2019, aged 90.

== Career ==
Cacheris was a co-founder of the law firm of Trout and Cacheris in Washington, D.C. He represented various figures in Washington, D.C., scandals, including:

- Defense of Attorney General John N. Mitchell, Watergate scandal figure, with his former partner, William G. Hundley.
- Defense of Fawn Hall, Iran-Contra scandal figure, who worked with Oliver North.
- Defense of Congressman Michael "Ozzy" Myers, ABSCAM scandal.
- Co-representation, with Jacob Stein, of Monica Lewinsky, associate of President Bill Clinton.
- Plea bargain for Aldrich Ames, CIA officer turned Russian agent, that enabled his wife to receive a lighter jail sentence for aiding and abetting Ames's espionage.
- Defense of Robert Hanssen, FBI agent and secret agent for the Soviet Union; a plea bargain allowed him to avoid the death penalty in exchange for complete cooperation in revealing his activities to the government, but not to the public. His wife would receive a "survivor" pension.
- Defense of Lawrence Franklin of the AIPAC lobbyist Espionage Act controversy
- Defense of Ana Montes, analyst of the Defense Intelligence Agency who pleaded guilty to conspiracy to commit espionage for the Intelligence Directorate of Cuba
- Defense of Mimi Robinson, ex-wife of John Rixse
- Defense of John Kiriakou, ex-CIA whistleblower

In April 2014, The New York Times reported that during the summer of 2013, NSA leaker Edward Snowden retained Cacheris to negotiate a plea deal with federal prosecutors that would allow Snowden to return to the U.S. and spare him significant prison time. However, The Times noted that nearly a year after Cacheris became involved, negotiations remained at an early stage and no agreement appeared imminent.
