= Edward Lee Howard =

United States intelligence officer and Soviet defector (1951–2002)

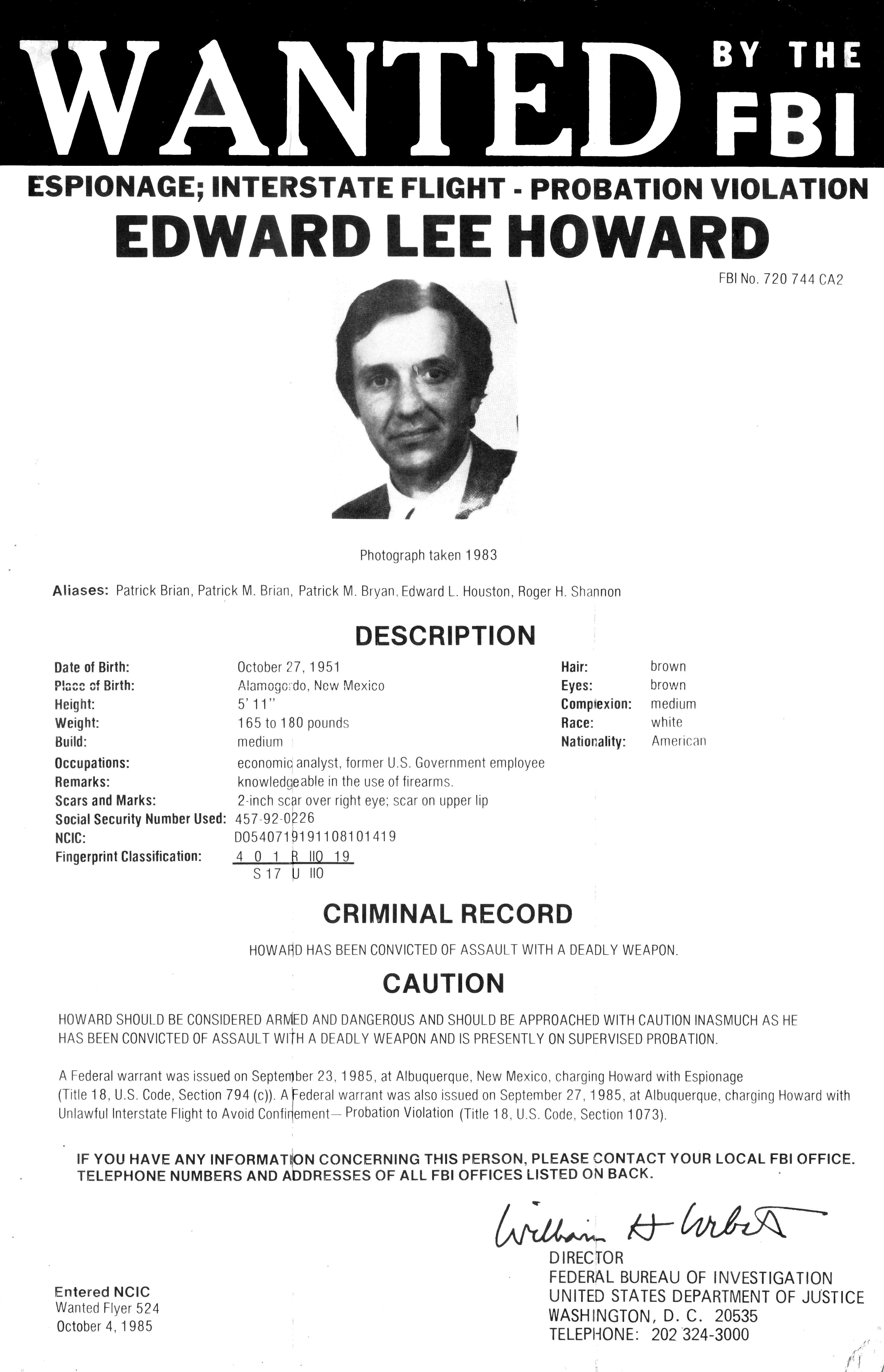
- Howard's 1986 FBI wanted poster
- Born: 27 October 1951; Alamogordo, New Mexico, U.S.
- Died: 12 July 2002 (aged 50); Moscow, Russia
- Education: American University (MBA)
- Occupation: CIA case officer
- Spouse: Mary Howard

Edward Lee Victor Howard (27 October 1951 – 12 July 2002) was a CIA case officer who defected to the Soviet Union.

== Pre-CIA career ==
Howard served as a Peace Corps volunteer in Bucaramanga, Colombia. There he met Mary Cedarleaf in 1973, and they were married three years later in St. Paul, Minnesota. In 1976, Howard earned a master's degree in business administration from the American University in Washington, D.C., and joined USAID. In February 1977, the Howards left for two years to live in Lima, Peru, where he worked on loan projects. There is no evidence to suggest that Howard was anything but a USAID loan officer. After Peru, the Howards returned to the United States, and he went to work in Chicago for a company doing environmental work. On March 19, 1983, the Howards had a son.

== CIA career ==
Howard was hired by the CIA in 1980 and was later joined by his wife, Mary, where they were both trained in intelligence and counter-intelligence methods. Shortly after the end of their training and before going on his first assignment, a routine polygraph test indicated that he had lied about past drug use, and he was fired by the CIA in 1983 shortly before he was to report to the CIA's station at the American embassy in Moscow.

Disgruntled over the perceived unfairness of having been dismissed over accusations of drug use, petty theft and deception, he began to abuse alcohol. He then began making mysterious phone calls to some former colleagues, both in Washington and in Moscow. In February 1984 after a drunken brawl he was arrested and charged with assault with a deadly weapon. The charges were later reduced to aggravated assault. At some point, Howard apparently began providing classified information to the KGB, possibly contacting KGB officers in Austria in 1984 during a visit there. His information has been blamed for exposing Adolf Tolkachev, who was then executed by the KGB.

In 1985, the CIA was severely shaken by several security leaks that led to exposure of officers and assets. On August 1, 1985, after twenty-five years of service in the KGB, Vitaly Yurchenko walked into the United States Embassy in Rome and defected to the United States. In the following interrogations by the CIA, he accused Howard and another officer, Ronald Pelton, of working for the KGB. In November of that year, Yurchenko himself re-defected back to the Soviet Union. It has been suggested that Yurchenko was acting as a re-doubled agent, seeking to fool the CIA with wrong leads to protect one of the Soviet Union's most important agents at the CIA, Aldrich Ames.

== Surveillance and escape ==
The FBI initiated surveillance of the Howards in Santa Fe, New Mexico. A search warrant was subsequently secured to intercept the Howards' telephonic communications. On 20 September 1985, Howard approached a member of a surveillance team and indicated his willingness to negotiate, provided he first secured legal representation; a meeting was accordingly scheduled for the following week.

However, Howard absconded the following evening. Whilst he and his wife were returning from dinner, Howard leapt from the vehicle as his wife decelerated to negotiate a corner. He placed a decoy, constructed from stuffed clothing and an antiquated wig stand, in his seat to deceive the pursuing agents, before fleeing to Albuquerque to board a flight to New York City. Upon returning home, his wife dialled a number associated with an answering machine and played a pre-recorded message from Howard; this was intended to mislead the wiretap and afford her husband additional time to escape.

From New York, Howard travelled to Helsinki, where he sought asylum at the Soviet embassy. Howard maintained his innocence until his demise. He asserted that his flight was motivated solely by the belief that the agency had selected him as a scapegoat to fit the profile provided by Yurchenko. Howard insisted that he had refused to divulge any information of significant importance in exchange for Soviet protection. In 1995, Howard's memoirs, called Safe House, were published by National Press Books in which Howard indicated that he was prepared for a plea bargain with the United States.

== Death ==
Howard died on July 12, 2002, at his Russian dacha, reportedly from a broken neck after a fall in his home.

== See also ==
- Robert Hanssen, American double agent spy
- Harold James Nicholson, American spy incarcerated in a federal prison
- Earl Edwin Pitts, former FBI agent convicted of espionage
