= Operation Denver =

KGB disinformation campaign

- Russian: Операция «Инфекция»
- Romanization: Operatsiya "Infektsiya"
- IPA: [ɐpʲɪˈrat͡sɨjə ɪnˈfʲekt͡sɨjə]

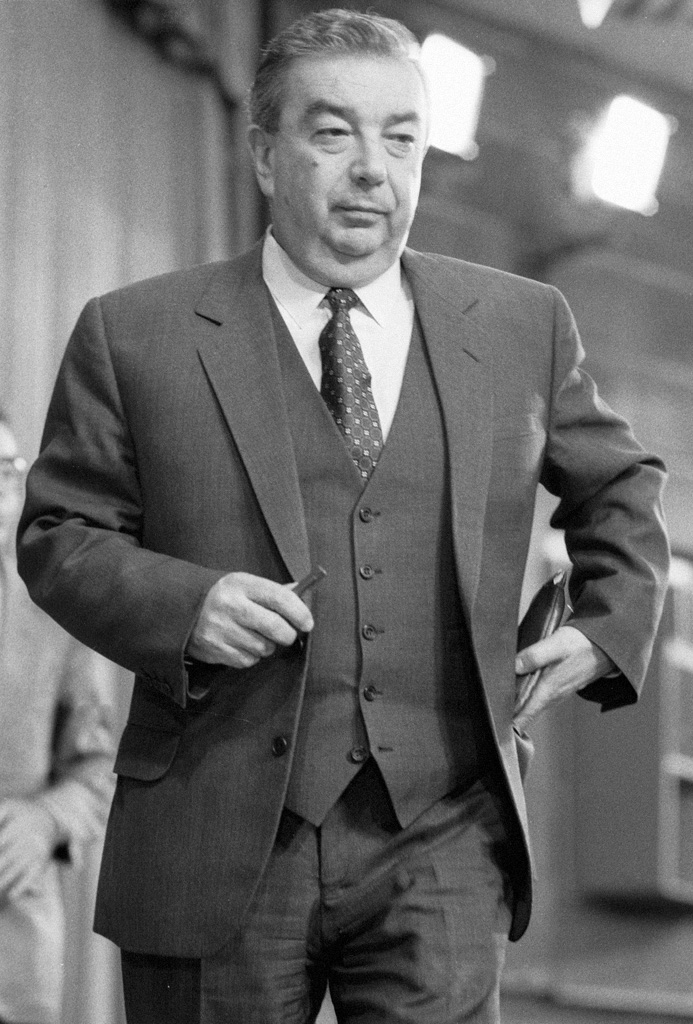
In 1992, Director of Russia's Foreign Intelligence Service (SVR) Yevgeny Primakov admitted that the KGB was behind the Soviet newspaper articles claiming that AIDS was created by the U.S. government.

Operation Denver (sometimes referred to as "Operation INFEKTION" from German: INFEKTION) was an active measure disinformation campaign run by the KGB in the 1980s to plant the idea that the United States had invented HIV/AIDS as part of a biological weapons research project at Fort Detrick, Maryland. Historian Thomas Boghardt popularized the codename "INFEKTION" based on the claims of former East German Ministry for State Security (Stasi) officer Günter Bohnsack, who claimed that the Stasi codename for the campaign was either "INFEKTION" or perhaps also "VORWÄRTS II" ("FORWARD II"). However, historians Christopher Nehring and Douglas Selvage found in the former Stasi and Bulgarian State Security archives materials that prove the actual Stasi codename for the AIDS disinformation campaign was Operation Denver. The operation involved "an extraordinary amount of effort – funding radio programs, courting journalists, distributing would-be scientific studies", and even became the subject of a report by Dan Rather on the CBS Evening News.

The Soviet Union used the campaign to undermine the United States' credibility, foster anti-Americanism, diplomatically isolate the U.S. abroad, and create tensions between host countries and the U.S. over the presence of American military bases, which were often portrayed as the cause of AIDS outbreaks in local populations.

== Story genesis and progression ==
The groundwork appeared in the pro-Soviet Indian newspaper Patriot, which, according to a KGB defector named Ilya Dzerkvelov, was set up by the KGB in 1962 with the sole purpose of publishing disinformation. An anonymous letter was sent to the editor in July 1983 from a "well-known American scientist and anthropologist" who claimed that AIDS was manufactured at Fort Detrick by genetic engineers. The "scientist" claimed that "that deadly mysterious disease was believed to be the results of the Pentagon's experiments to develop new and dangerous biological weapons", and implicated Centers for Disease Control and Prevention (CDC) scientists sent to Africa and Latin America to find dangerous viruses alien to Asia and Europe. These results were purportedly analyzed in Atlanta and Fort Detrick and thus the "most likely course of events" leading to the development of AIDS. The letter claimed that The Pentagon was continuing such experiments in neighboring Pakistan and as a result, the AIDS virus was threatening to spread to India. The title of the article, "AIDS may invade India", suggested that the immediate goal of the KGB's disinformation was to exacerbate tensions between the U.S., India, and Pakistan.

Two years later, the KGB apparently decided to make use of its earlier disinformation to launch an international campaign to discredit the U.S. They wrote in a telegram to their allied secret service in Bulgaria, the Bulgarian Committee for State Security (KDS) on September 7, 1985:

We are conducting a series of [active] measures in connection with the appearance in recent years in the USA of a new and dangerous disease, "Acquired Immune Deficiency Syndrome – AIDS"…, and its subsequent, large-scale spread to other countries, including those in Western Europe. The goal of these measures is to create a favorable opinion for us abroad that this disease is the result of secret experiments with a new type of biological weapon by the secret services of the USA and the Pentagon that spun out of control.

The telegram, which referred indirectly back to the Patriot article ("facts ... in the press of the developing countries, in particular India"), provided guidance to Bulgarian State Security regarding how to couch their AIDS disinformation:

Facts have already been cited in the press of the developing countries, in particular India, that testify to the involvement of the special services of the United States and the Pentagon in the appearance and rapid spread of the AIDS disease in the United States, as well as other countries. Judging by these reports, along with the interest shown by the U.S. military in the symptoms of AIDS and the rate and geography of its spread, the most likely assumption is that this most dangerous disease is the result of yet another Pentagon experiment with a new type of biological weapon. This is confirmed by the fact that the disease affected initially only certain groups of people: homosexuals, drug addicts, immigrants from Latin America.

A month later, the Soviet newspaper Literaturnaya Gazeta, also a known outlet for KGB disinformation, published an article from Valentin Zapevalov entitled, "Panic in the West, or what is hiding behind the sensation surrounding AIDS". It cited the (dis)information contained in the Patriot article, but also gave further details regarding the alleged development of the AIDS virus. Employees of the CDC had allegedly assisted the Pentagon by traveling to Zaire, Nigeria and Latin America to collect samples of the "most pathogenic viruses" that could not be found in Europe or Asia. These samples were then combined to develop the human immunodeficiency virus (HIV) that causes AIDS. The disinformation campaign insisted the Pentagon then carried out isolated experiments in Haiti and within the U.S. itself on marginalized groups in U.S. society: drug addicts, homosexuals, and the homeless. Zapevalov's article was subsequently reprinted in Kuwait, Bahrain, Finland, Sweden, Peru, and other countries. It followed very closely the guidelines that the KGB had already sent to its Bulgarian "comrades" a month before.

=== Stasi involvement in the disinformation campaign ===
Determining the exact role of the Stasi in the AIDS disinformation campaign has been difficult, given that around 90% of the records of its foreign intelligence division, the Main Directorate for Reconnaissance (HVA) were destroyed or disappeared in 1989–90. Based on materials in the Bulgarian secret police archives, the card files of the HVA, and documents from or relating to the HVA scattered among the records of other divisions of the Stasi, it has been possible to reconstruct some aspects of the Stasi's involvement in the disinformation campaign. At the beginning of September 1986, the tenth division of the HVA (HVA/X), responsible for organizing and coordinating the HVA's campaigns of active measures, wrote the following in a draft plan for cooperation with Bulgarian State Security:

Operation "DENVER". With the goal of exposing the dangers to mankind arising from the research, production, and use of biological weapons, and also in order to strengthen anti-American sentiments in the world and to spark domestic political controversies in the USA, the GDR [German Democratic Republic] side will deliver a scientific study and other materials that prove that AIDS originated in the USA, not in Africa, and that AIDS is a product of the USA’s bioweapons research.

The KGB confirmed that the East German HVA was playing a central role on various occasions, including in a telegram to the Bulgarians in 1987:

The AIDS issue

A complex of [active] measures regarding this issue has been carried out since 1985 in cooperation with the [East] German and to some extent the Czech colleagues. In the initial stage, the task was resolved of spreading in the mass media the version regarding the artificial origin of the AIDS virus and the Pentagon’s involvement in by means of the military-biological laboratory at Fort Detrick.

As a result of our joint efforts, it was possible to widely disseminate this version.

=== The Segal Report ===
As noted above, the Stasi's HVA/X had written that it would send its Bulgarian "comrades" a "scientific study" allegedly "proving" that "AIDS is a product of the USA's bioweapons research". From the context of the discussions between officers of the HVA/X and their Bulgarian counterparts in mid-September 1986, it was clear which study was meant: "AIDS: Its Nature and Origin" by Soviet-East German biologist Jakob Segal and his wife, Lilli Segal. The study had been distributed at the summit meeting of the Non-Aligned Movement in August–September 1986 in a brochure entitled, "AIDS: USA home-made evil, NOT out of AFRICA". The report was quoted heavily by Soviet propagandists, and the Segals were often said to be French researchers to hide their connections to communism. Although both Segals, given the double danger to them as Jews and members of the Communist Party of Germany, had fled into exile in France in 1933, both had attained Soviet citizenship in 1940 on the basis of Jakob's birth in then Soviet-annexed Lithuania, and in 1953, they had returned to Germany—specifically, to communist East Berlin.

In his report, Segal postulated that the AIDS virus was synthesized by combining parts of two distantly related retroviruses: VISNA and HTLV-1. An excerpt of the Segal Report reads as follows:

It is very easy using genetic technologies to unite two parts of completely independent viruses… but who would be interested in doing this? The military, of course… In 1977 a special top security lab… was set up…at the Pentagon's central biological laboratory. One year after that… the first cases of AIDS occurred in the US, in New York City. How it occurred precisely at this moment and how the virus managed to get out of the secret, hush-hush laboratory is quite easy to understand. Everyone knows that prisoners are used for military experiments in the U.S. They are promised their freedom if they come out of the experiment alive.

Elsewhere in the report, Segal said that his hypothesis was based purely on assumptions, extrapolations, and hearsay and not at all on direct scientific evidence.

The exact relationship of both Segals to the KGB, Stasi, or both at this time—to the extent that it existed—remains unclear. Both publicly denied any involvement of the KGB or Stasi in their work. The Deputy Director of HVA/X, Wolfgang Mutz, hinted that the HVA had played a role in the publication—or actually, the photocopying—and distribution of the Harare brochure in talks with Bulgarian State Security in September 1986. He also suggested that the "operational division" of the HVA with which HVA/X had been cooperating in the disinformation campaign had somehow "attracted" Segal to his research.

This "operational division" was in fact an office in the Sector for Science and Technology (Sektor Wissenschaft und Technik, SWT) of the HVA, responsible for intelligence-gathering on AIDS and genetic engineering (HVA/SWT/XIII/5). This office had registered a "security dossier" (Sicherungsvorgang, SVG) "Wind" on September 6, 1985, regarding the protection of East German scientists in the areas of AIDS research, genetic engineering and biotechnology from outside "attacks" in the form of espionage or manipulation by foreign agents. This office in HVA/SWT apparently registered both Segals in this dossier as "contact persons" under the codename "Diagnosis"; whenever other divisions of the Stasi inquired about the Segals, they were directed to this office. HVA/SWT—or "the security", as Jakob Segal called them—gave him at least one piece of advice regarding his study before its printing and distribution. Whether Segal listened to this advice remains unclear. Still, given their official designation as "contact persons", they need not have known, at least officially, that they were dealing with the Stasi, although Jakob Segal likely knew or could have guessed, given his past dealings with both the Stasi and the KGB. It is quite possible that HVA/SWT was already coordinating with the KGB regarding Segal's research—even without his knowledge—in the second half of 1985, at the time that "Wind" was registered. Nevertheless, none of the Stasi officers involved with "Wind" or Operation "DENVER" ever claimed that the HVA had played a role in drafting Segal's study. It was clearly his own work, in cooperation with his wife Lilli, although he knew and expected that it would be used for "propaganda".

Whatever exact relationship the Segals may or may not have had to the Soviet or East German security services, the KGB praised Segal's work in its 1987 telegram to Bulgarian State Security. His articles and brochures, the KGB wrote, had attained "great renown". This was especially the case in African countries, where governments and researchers were rejecting as racist assertions by U.S. researchers that AIDS had originated naturally in Africa, where it had spread from monkeys to humans. The KGB wrote the Bulgarians:

We are currently resolving the task of bringing the [active] measures down to a more practical level, and in particular, to attain specific political results by exploiting the "laboratory version" for AM [active measures] on other issues. So, efforts are being made to intensify anti-base sentiments in countries where American forces are deployed by using slogans suggesting that U.S. soldiers are the most dangerous carriers of the virus. By demonstrating the defeat of the "African version" [of AIDS' origins], we can whip up anti-American sentiments throughout the states of the continent.

=== Dissemination methods ===
The AIDS story exploded across the world, and was repeated by Soviet newspapers, magazines, wire services, radio broadcasts, and television. It appeared 40 times in Soviet media in 1987 alone. It received coverage in over 80 countries in more than 30 languages, primarily in leftist and communist media publications, and was found in countries as widespread as Bolivia, Grenada, Pakistan, New Zealand, Nigeria, and Malta. A few versions made their way into non-communist press in Indonesia and the Philippines.

Dissemination was usually along a recognized pattern: propaganda and disinformation would first appear in a country outside of the USSR and only then be picked up by a Soviet news agency, which attributed it to others' investigative journalism. That the story came from a foreign source (not widely known to be Soviet controlled or influenced) added credibility to the allegations, especially in impoverished and less educated countries which generally could not afford access to Western news satellite feeds. To aid in media placement, Soviet propaganda was provided free of charge, and many stories came with cash benefits. This was particularly the case in India and Ghana, where the Soviet Union maintained a large propaganda and disinformation apparatus for covert media placement.

==== Soviet narrative ====
To explain how AIDS outbreaks in Africa occurred simultaneously, the Moscow World Service announced a discovery by Soviet correspondent Aleksandr Zhukov, who claimed that in the early 1970s, a Pentagon-controlled West German lab in Zaire "succeeded in modifying the non-lethal Green Monkey virus into the deadly AIDS virus". Radio Moscow also claimed that instead of testing a cholera vaccine, American scientists were actually infecting unwitting Zairians, thus spreading AIDS throughout the continent. These scientists were unaware of the long period before symptom onset, and resumed experimentation on convicts upon return to the U.S., where it then spread when the prisoners escaped.

Claims that the Central Intelligence Agency (CIA) had sent "AIDS-oiled condoms" to other countries sprang up independently in the African press, well after the disinformation operation started. In 1987, a book (Once Again About the CIA) was published by the Novosti Press Agency, with the quote:

The CIA Directorate of Science and Technology is continuously modernizing its inventory of pathogenic preparations, bacteria and viruses and studying their effect on man in various parts of the world. To this end, the CIA uses American medical centers in foreign countries. A case in point was the Pakistani Medical Research Center in Lahore… set up in 1962 allegedly for combating malaria.

The resulting public backlash eventually closed down the legitimate medical research centre. Soviet allegations declared the purpose of these research projects, to include that of AIDS, was to "enlarge the war arsenal".

== Worldwide response to AIDS allegations ==
Deception, Disinformation, and Strategic Communications, cover illustrating propaganda from Operation INFEKTION

Ironically, many Soviet scientists were soliciting help from U.S. researchers to help address the Soviet Union's burgeoning AIDS problem, while stressing the virus' natural origins. The U.S. refused to help as long as the disinformation campaign continued. The Segal Report and the plenitude of press articles were dismissed by both Western and Soviet virologists as nonsense.

Dr. Meinrad Koch, a West Berlin AIDS expert, stated in 1987 that the Segal Report was "utter nonsense" and called it an "evil pseudo-scientific political concoction". Other scientists also pointed out flaws and inaccuracies in the Segal Report, including Dr. Viktor Zhdanov of the D. I. Ivanovsky Institute of Virology in Moscow, who was the top Soviet AIDS expert at the time. The president of the USSR Academy of Medical Sciences clearly stated that he believed the virus to be of natural origin. Other scientists and doctors from Paris, East and West Berlin, India, and Belgium called the AIDS rumors lies, scientifically unfounded, and otherwise impossible to seriously consider. Although Segal himself never said "this is fact" and was very careful to maintain this line throughout his report, "such technical qualifiers do not diminish the impact of the charges, however, because when they are replayed, such qualifiers are typically either omitted or overlooked by readers or listeners".

U.S. embassy officials wrote dozens of letters to various newspaper editors and journalists, and held meetings and press conferences to clarify matters. Many of their efforts resulted in newspapers printing retractions and apologies. Rebuttals appeared in reports to Congress and from the Department of State saying that it was impossible at the time to build a virus as complex as AIDS; medical research had only gotten so far as to clone simple viruses. Antibodies were found decades earlier than the reported research started, and the main academic source used for the story (Segal Report) contained inaccuracies about even such basic things as North American geography—Segal said that outbreaks appeared in New York City because it was the closest major city to Fort Detrick. Philadelphia, Baltimore, and Washington, D.C. are all closer, while New York is 200 miles (320 km) away.

The Gorbachev administration also responded indignantly and launched a defensive denial campaign "aimed at limiting the damage done to its credibility by U.S. efforts to raise world consciousness concerning the scope of Soviet disinformation activities". The Soviet Union interfered with general attempts by U.S. Embassy officials to address misconceptions and expose the Soviet disinformation campaign, including placing pressure on news agencies that recanted their position. For example, Literaturnaya Gazeta on December 3, 1986, castigated a Brazilian newspaper which earlier in the year had run a retraction following its publication of the AIDS disinformation story. In 1987, Moscow's Novosti news agency disseminated a report datelined Brazzaville (Congo), calling on the West to put an end to the "anti-African campaign", and reiterating "the charges that the virus was created in U.S. military laboratories" while in 1986 Literaturnaya Gazeta warned specifically against contact with Americans.

In 1988, Sovetskaya Rossiya put out an article defending their right to report different views. The chief of Novosti stated that it drew upon foreign sources for much of the AIDS coverage, and that the press was free under glasnost.

The Mitrokhin Archive reveals that:

Faced with American protests and the denunciation of the story by the international scientific community, however, Gorbachev and his advisers were clearly concerned that exposure of Soviet disinformation might damage the new Soviet image in the West. In August 1987 US officials were told in Moscow that the Aids story was officially disowned. Soviet press coverage of the story came to an almost complete halt.

The campaign faded from most Soviet media outlets, but it occasionally resurfaced abroad in Third World countries as late as 1988, usually via press placement agents.

== Aftermath ==
In 1992, 15% of Americans considered it definitely or probably true that "the AIDS virus was created deliberately in a government laboratory". In 2005, a study by the RAND Corporation and Oregon State University revealed that nearly 50% of African Americans thought AIDS was man-made, over 25% believed AIDS was a product of a government laboratory, 12% believed it was created and spread by the CIA, and 15% believed that AIDS was a form of genocide against black people. Other AIDS conspiracy theories have abounded, and have been discredited by the mainstream scientific community.

In popular culture, the Kanye West song "Heard 'Em Say" tells listeners, "I know that the government administer AIDS," and the R.E.M. song "Revolution" says in its lyrics: "The virus was invented."

In South Africa, the former president, Thabo Mbeki cited the operation's theory of Fort Detrick in denying the science of HIV.

In 1992, Director of Russia's Foreign Intelligence Service (SVR) Yevgeny Primakov admitted that the KGB was behind the newspaper articles claiming that AIDS was created by the U.S. government. Segal's role was exposed by KGB defector Vasili Mitrokhin in the Mitrokhin Archive. Jack Koehler's 1999 book, Stasi: The Untold Story of the East German Secret Police, describes how the Stasi cooperated with the KGB to spread the story.

Insofar as the distrust in medical authorities created by the operation led to a distrust in the treatment for AIDS recommended by medical science ( "numerous studies ... have shown that those who disbelieve the science on the origins of H.I.V. are less likely to engage in safe sex or to regularly take recommended medication if infected"), the operation may have cost many lives. Yaffa argued that the delay in "widespread implementation of antiretroviral therapies in South Africa" may have cost "as many" as 330,000 lives.

== See also ==
- AIDS conspiracy theories
- Cold Case Hammarskjöld – documentary film with a similar premise, alleging that a South African white supremacist organization had helped spread AIDS throughout Africa using UN-sponsored medical clinics
- Operation PANDORA
- Operation Cedar (KGB)
