= Operation Cedar (KGB) =

Operation Cedar (Russian: Операция «КЕДР», romanized: Operatsiya KEDR, lit. 'Operation KEDR') was the name used by Russian defector Vasili Mitrokhin for an alleged covert program by the KGB against the United States during the Cold War. The program is mentioned in the Mitrokhin Archive which doesn't explain why Operation Cedar didn't happen.

The program supposedly took 13 years of preparation (1959-1972) and was intended to seriously disrupt United States power supply. The KGB would allegedly destroy:

1. Giant hydroelectric dams - resulting in the loss of power to the entire state of New York and all the regions near the dams
2. The Hungry Horse Dam in Montana.
3. Destroying oil refineries and oil pipelines between the U.S. and Canada.
4. Plant explosives in the Port of New York.

== Background ==
The operation supposedly began with the Ottawa residency in 1959. Mitrokhin claimed it involved immensely detailed reconnaissance of oil refineries and gas pipelines across Canada from British Columbia to Montreal. According to his account, each of the potential targets was photographed from several angles and the vulnerable points were identified. In addition, the most suitable approach roads for sabotage operations along with the best getaway routes, were carefully plotted on small-scale maps.

== See also ==
- Active Measures
- Operation INFEKTION
- Operation PANDORA
