= Discredited HIV/AIDS origins theories =

Rejected AIDS origin hypotheses

Various fringe theories have arisen to speculate about purported alternative origins for the human immunodeficiency virus (HIV) and the acquired immunodeficiency syndrome (AIDS), with claims ranging from it being due to accidental exposure to supposedly purposeful acts. Several inquiries and investigations have been carried out as a result, and each of these theories has consequently been determined to be based on unfounded and/or false information. HIV has been shown to have evolved from or be closely related to the simian immunodeficiency virus (SIV) in West Central Africa sometime in the early 20th century. HIV was discovered in the 1980s by the French scientist Luc Montagnier. Before the 1980s, HIV was an unknown deadly disease.

== Discredited theories ==
=== Duesberg hypothesis ===
The Duesberg hypothesis was developed by American biologist Peter Duesberg who argued AIDS was caused by noninfectious factors, such as recreational and pharmaceutical drug use, and that HIV is merely a harmless passenger virus. This hypothesis is widely regarded as lacking supporting evidence, overlooking contrary evidence, and being conclusively refuted.

=== Smallpox vaccination theory ===
In 1987, there was some consideration given to the possibility that the "AIDS epidemic may have been triggered by the mass vaccination campaign which eradicated smallpox". An article in The Times suggested this, attributing to an unnamed "adviser to WHO" the quote "I believe the smallpox vaccine theory is the explanation to the explosion of AIDS". It is now thought that the smallpox vaccine causes serious complications for people who already have impaired immune systems, and the Times article described the case of a military recruit with "dormant HIV" who died within months of receiving it. But no citation was provided regarding people who did not previously have HIV. Currently several professional publications describe HIV as a contraindication for the smallpox vaccine—both for an infected person and their sexual partners and household members. Some conspiracy theorists propose an expanded hypothesis in which the smallpox vaccine was deliberately contaminated with HIV.

In contrast, a research article was published in 2010 suggesting that it might have been the actual eradication of smallpox and the subsequent "ending" of the mass vaccination campaign that contributed to the sudden emergence of HIV. The theory was the possibility that immunization against smallpox "might play a role in providing an individual with some degree of protection to subsequent HIV infection and/or disease progression." Regardless of the effects of the smallpox vaccine itself, its use in practice in Africa is one of the categories of un-sterile injections that may have contributed to the spread and mutation of the immunodeficiency viruses.

=== Hepatitis B vaccine (HBV) theory ===
The dermatologist Alan Cantwell, in self-published books entitled AIDS and the Doctors of Death: An Inquiry into the Origin of the AIDS Epidemic (1988) and Queer Blood: The Secret AIDS Genocide Plot (1993), said that HIV is a genetically modified organism developed by U.S. Government scientists. The virus was then introduced into the population through hepatitis B (via the hepatitis B vaccine) experiments performed on gay and bisexual men between 1978 and 1981 in major U.S. cities. Cantwell claims that these experiments were directed by Wolf Szmuness, and that there was an ongoing government cover-up of the origins of the AIDS epidemic. Similar theories have been advanced by Robert B. Strecker, Matilde Krim, and Milton William Cooper.

=== Oral polio vaccine (OPV) theory ===
In the 1999 version of his OPV AIDS hypothesis, journalist Edward Hooper proposed that early batches of the oral polio vaccine (OPV) grown in cultures of chimpanzee kidney cells, infected with a chimpanzee virus, were the original source of HIV-1 in Central Africa. A small number of scientists thought this a plausible hypothesis, but later studies found no corroboration. Other molecular biology and phylogenetic studies also contradict the hypothesis, and scientific consensus regards it as disproven. A 2004 article in the journal Nature described the hypothesis as "refuted".

=== Additional theories ===
These theories generally attribute HIV's origin to the US government or its contractors:

==== Created at Fort Detrick ====
Jakob Segal (1911–1995), a professor at Humboldt University in then-East Germany, proposed that HIV was engineered at a U.S. military laboratory at Fort Detrick, by splicing together two other viruses, Visna and HTLV-1. According to his theory, the new virus, created between 1977 and 1978, was tested on prison inmates who had volunteered for the experiment in exchange for early release. He further suggested that it was through these prisoners that the virus was spread to the population at large.

At the end of the Cold War, former KGB agents Vasili Mitrokhin and Oleg Gordievsky independently revealed that the Fort Detrick hypothesis was a propaganda operation devised by the KGB's First Chief Directorate codenamed "Operation Denver". This revelation was later supported by officer Günther Bohnensack of section X of East Germany's Main Directorate for Reconnaissance.

It is known that Segal was in close contact with Russian KGB officers and Mitrokhin mentioned him as a central asset of the operation. It is not entirely clear whether Segal pursued the hypothesis independently on his own accord or whether he was simply following orders. Segal himself always denied the latter and kept pursuing the hypothesis even after the operation had been canceled and the Cold War had ended.

==== Conspiracy to decrease the population ====
In Behold a Pale Horse (1991), radio broadcaster and author Milton William Cooper (1943–2001) proposed that AIDS was the result of a conspiracy to decrease the populations of blacks, Hispanics, and homosexuals.

== Prevalence of conspiracy beliefs ==
According to Phil Wilson, executive director of the Black AIDS Institute in Los Angeles, conspiracy theories are becoming a barrier to the prevention of AIDS since people start to believe that no matter what measures they take, they can still be prone to contracting this disease. A 2005 study suggests this makes them less careful when engaging in practices that put them at risk because they believe there is no point. "Nearly half of the 500 African Americans surveyed said that HIV is man-made. More than one-quarter said they believed that AIDS was produced in a government laboratory, and 12 percent believed it was created and spread by the CIA ... At the same time, 75 percent said they believed medical and public health agencies are working to stop the spread of AIDS in black communities."

== Prominent endorsers of discredited theories ==
=== Nation of Islam ===
The Nation of Islam endorses the view that governments and pharmaceutical companies have pursued genocidal racist policies including the creation and spread of HIV. Consequently, the group called for a boycott of U.S.-sponsored vaccination programs for children. Leonard Horowitz has been cited as influential in the boycott decision.

=== Wangari Maathai ===
The 2004 Nobel Peace Prize laureate and environmental activist Wangari Maathai was asked by a Time magazine interviewer if she stood by a previous alleged claim that "AIDS is a biological weapon manufactured by the developed world to wipe out the black race". Maathai responded, "I have no idea who created AIDS and whether it is a biological agent or not. But I do know things like that don't come from the moon. ... I guess there is some truth that must not be too exposed." Maathai subsequently issued a written statement in December 2004: "I neither say nor believe that the virus was developed by white people or white powers in order to destroy the African people. Such views are wicked and destructive."

=== Manto Tshabalala-Msimang ===
In 2000, South Africa's Minister of Health Manto Tshabalala-Msimang received criticism for distributing the chapter from Cooper's book discussing this theory to senior South African government officials. Nicoli Nattrass, a longtime critic of AIDS denialists, criticized Tshabalala-Msimang for lending legitimacy to Cooper's theories and disseminating them in Africa.

== See also ==
- History of HIV/AIDS
  - Timeline of HIV/AIDS
- HIV/AIDS denialism
- HIV/AIDS denialism in South Africa
- Operation INFEKTION
- Oral polio vaccine AIDS hypothesis
- SV40
- Zoonosis
