= John Alexander Symonds =

English police officer and KGB agent

John Alexander Symonds (13 July 1935 – 7 January 2017) was an English Metropolitan Police officer and KGB agent.

== Biography ==
John Alexander Symonds was born in the Soke of Peterborough on 13 July 1935. He was commissioned in the Royal Artillery, serving from 1953 to 1956.

Symonds joined the Metropolitan Police in 1956 on a fast track programme but left within a year and worked in Soho area selling tills for the entertainment industry, he rejoined the Metropolitan Police in 1959 after he got married, initially serving in Beckenham and Croydon before being promoted to detective sergeant at Camberwell in 1968. In 1969, after having been a police officer for 15 years, Symonds was one of three officers charged with corruption following a newspaper investigation into bribery at Scotland Yard. He skipped bail and fled to Morocco in 1972. Symonds claimed later that he had been "fitted up" and forced to leave under pain of death after having threatened to expose during any trial "the endemic and systemic corruption within the Metropolitan Police service" at the time.

In Morocco, Symonds served as a mercenary, making use of his police and military expertise to train African troops to use the 25-pounder howitzer, an artillery piece that was, by that time, obsolete by British Army standards and had been sold off as surplus to several African countries. It was at this point that Symonds was recruited by the KGB.

Between 1972 and 1980, he was a KGB agent employed as a "Romeo spy" with the codename SKOT. He was directed by his Soviet masters to seduce women working in Western embassies with the aim of obtaining secrets. In 1981, he returned to England.

Symonds revealed himself as a spy to the police and security services in the 1980s, and appeared on the front page of the Daily Express (1985) and in the News on Sunday (1987), but was dismissed as "a fantasist". It was only with the defection of Major Vasili Mitrokhin in 1992 and the subsequent publication of the Mitrokhin Archive in 1999, in which Symonds was named as a spy for the Soviet Union, that his claim gained credence.

Symonds was never prosecuted for any offence related to espionage or spying, and was never interviewed by MI5 or the Secret Intelligence Service. It was confirmed that Symonds was not being prosecuted because he had been offered immunity by the Director of Public Prosecutions office in 1984 in connection with a criminal inquiry. This was granted in relation to police corruption inquiries, stated by Symonds to be Operation Countryman.

The publication of Mitrokhin's material launched a parliamentary inquiry by the Intelligence and Security Committee. Its report when published referred to the lack of interest shown by the security services in Symonds' case:

The Committee believes that it was a serious failure of the Security Service not to refer Mr Symonds' case to the Law Officers in mid 1993. We are concerned that it took over 9 months to consult the Law Officers after he was identified in the draft book. We believe that the Service could have interviewed Mr Symonds, at least for the intelligence and historical record.

Symonds died in Kent on 7 January 2017, at the age of 81.

== Romeo Spy ==
Prodigy Pictures were for some time in the pre-production stage of making a movie based on the autobiography of John Symonds. However, as of September 2013 the movie appeared to be no longer under development.
