= American espionage in the Soviet Union and Russian Federation =

Espionage by the United States against the Soviet Union and Russia

The United States has conducted espionage against the Soviet Union and its successor state, the Russian Federation, using both human intelligence (HUMINT) and technical intelligence (TECHINT) methods throughout the Cold War and into the present day. American intelligence operations against the Soviet Union included recruiting agents within the Soviet government and military, constructing tunnels to tap communications lines, conducting aerial reconnaissance, and developing satellite imagery systems.

== Soviet Union ==
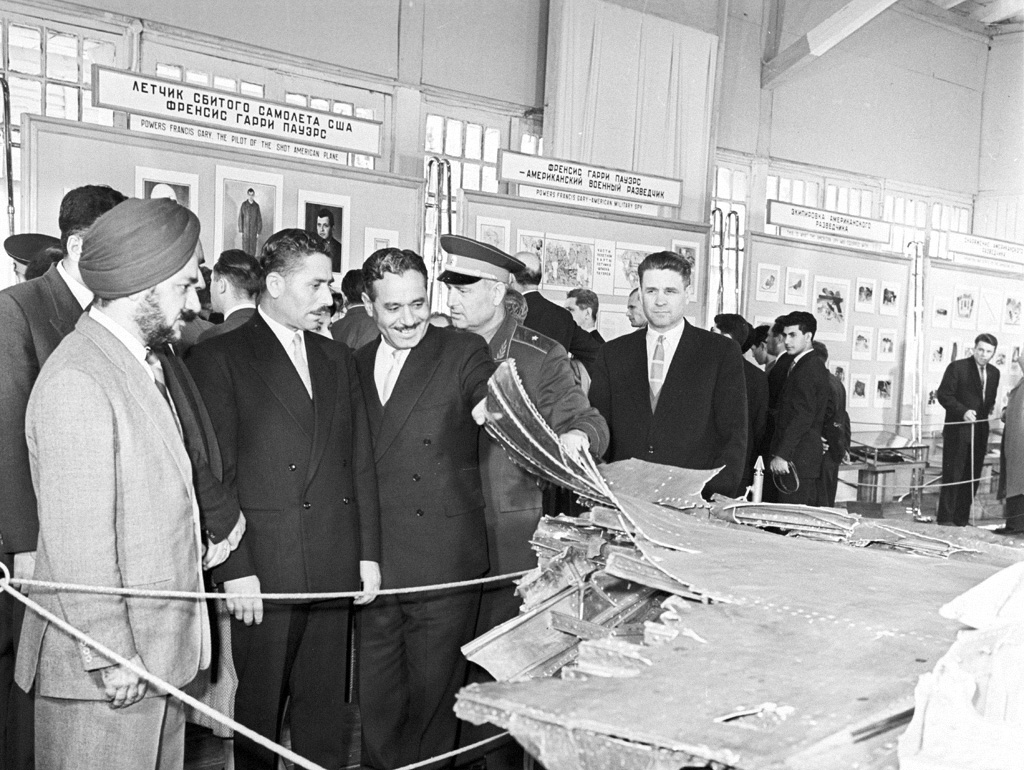
Military attaches of foreign embassies visiting the exhibition of remains of U.S. U-2 spy-in-the-sky aircraft destroyed May 1, 1960 near Sverdlovsk (now Yekaterinburg)

Throughout the Cold War, the United States invested heavily in espionage operations against the Soviet Union as tensions between the two superpowers increased.

=== Human intelligence ===
The Central Intelligence Agency recruited several agents within the Soviet military and intelligence establishment during the Cold War. Some became the most valuable sources in American intelligence history.

==== Pyotr Popov ====
Pyotr Popov, a GRU officer, was the first Soviet military intelligence officer recruited by the CIA. He approached American officials in Vienna in 1952 as a "walk-in" volunteer. At a time when the United States lacked U-2 reconnaissance aircraft or satellite intelligence, Popov was considered valuable for providing information on Soviet military capabilities. He was arrested and executed in 1959.

==== Oleg Penkovsky ====
Oleg Penkovsky, a GRU colonel codenamed HERO by the CIA and YOGA by MI6, supplied intelligence to American and British intelligence services from 1961 to 1962. He provided information on the appearance and deployment of Soviet intermediate-range ballistic missiles, which proved decisive during the Cuban Missile Crisis. According to the CIA, Penkovsky's intelligence allowed President John F. Kennedy to understand that the Soviet missile sites in Cuba were not yet fully operational, giving him time to negotiate a diplomatic solution.Soviet counterintelligence arrested him in October 1962. He was tried publicly alongside his British courier Greville Wynne and executed on May 16, 1963.

==== Dmitri Polyakov ====
Dmitri Polyakov (codenamed TOPHAT) was a GRU general who spied for the FBI and CIA from 1961 to 1988, becoming the highest-ranking Soviet Armed Forces officer to work for American intelligence. As Polyakov rose through the GRU ranks, he gained access to Soviet war planning, military strategy, and the identities and methods of GRU agents worldwide. He declined an offer of asylum from the CIA, stating: "I am not doing this for you. I am doing this for my country. I was born a Russian, and I will die a Russian." Polyakov was betrayed by CIA officer Aldrich Ames, arrested in 1986, tried in secret, and executed in 1988.

==== Adolf Tolkachev ====
Adolf Tolkachev, an electronics engineer at a secret Soviet research institute, provided the CIA with intelligence on Soviet avionics, cruise missiles, radar technology, and air defense systems from 1979 to 1985. Tolkachev approached the CIA repeatedly before establishing contact in January 1979. The U.S. Air Force estimated that his information saved approximately $2 billion in weapons research and development, earning him the nickname "the Billion Dollar Spy." His intelligence on Soviet fighter aircraft avionics proved useful during Operation Desert Storm in 1991. Tolkachev was betrayed by CIA officer Edward Lee Howard and executed in 1986.

=== Signals intelligence and technical operations ===
==== Operation Silver ====
From 1948 to 1955, the British Secret Intelligence Service conducted Operation Silver in Vienna, constructing tunnels to tap Soviet military telephone communications. Peter Lunn, head of the MI6 station in Vienna, discovered that Soviet military communications from Moscow to Austria passed through trunk lines in the suburb of Schwechat. MI6 constructed a 70-foot tunnel from a building it had purchased near the site. The operation provided intelligence on Soviet military intentions during the Korean War and established that the Soviets were not planning to expand the conflict to Europe. Operation Silver's success served as a model for the larger Berlin tunnel operation that followed.

==== Operation Gold ====
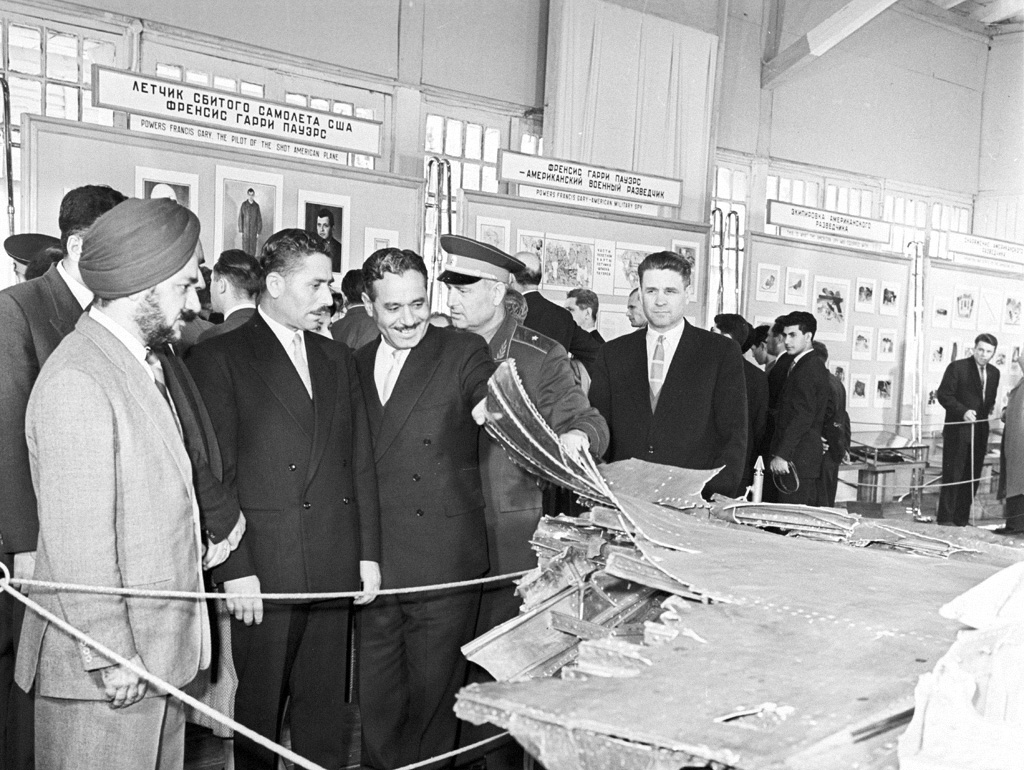
Military attaches visiting wreckage of a U.S. U-2 spy plane shot down near Sverdlovsk on May 1, 1960

Operation Gold (known as Operation Stopwatch by the British) was a joint CIA-SIS operation from 1954 to 1956 that constructed a 450-meter (1,476-foot) tunnel from West Berlin into the Soviet sector to tap into Soviet military communications. The operation was approved by CIA Director Allen Dulles in January 1954 and placed under the direction of William King Harvey. Construction required removing over 3,000 tons of soil, which was stored in a specially designed warehouse basement to avoid detection.

The tunnel intercepted communications between Moscow and Soviet military headquarters in Zossen, near Berlin, yielding intelligence on Soviet and Warsaw Pact military forces, Soviet atomic energy projects, and the establishment of an East German army. The operation ran for 11 months and 11 days before Soviet forces "discovered" it on April 21, 1956.

Soviet intelligence had learned of the operation from its inception through British mole George Blake, who attended planning meetings in London. The KGB allowed the operation to continue rather than compromise Blake, but did not feed disinformation through the tapped lines. Studies conducted years later confirmed that the intelligence collected was genuine. Instead of achieving a propaganda victory by exposing American espionage, the Soviets found that the press coverage focused on the operation's technical ingenuity.

=== Aerial reconnaissance ===
The United States conducted U-2 reconnaissance flights over the Soviet Union from 1956 to 1960, photographing military installations and missile sites. The program ended after the 1960 U-2 incident, when Soviet air defenses shot down a U-2 piloted by Francis Gary Powers near Sverdlovsk (now Yekaterinburg) on May 1, 1960. Powers ejected and was captured on the ground. President Dwight D. Eisenhower initially claimed the aircraft had gone off course while conducting meteorological research, but the Soviets displayed espionage equipment recovered from the wreckage. Powers was sentenced to ten years imprisonment but was exchanged on February 10, 1962, for Soviet agent Rudolf Abel.

=== Satellite reconnaissance ===
==== CORONA ====
The CORONA program (1959–1972) was America's first satellite reconnaissance system, developed jointly by the CIA and U.S. Air Force under the cover name "Discoverer." The program was initiated after the Soviet Union launched Sputnik 1 in October 1957 and accelerated following the 1960 U-2 shootdown.

CORONA satellites photographed the Soviet Union, China, and other areas, returning film capsules that were recovered in mid-air over the Pacific Ocean. The program's first successful mission on August 18, 1960, returned more photographic coverage of the Soviet Union than all previous U-2 flights combined.

CORONA imagery helped resolve the "missile gap" debate by revealing that Soviet ICBM capabilities were far smaller than previously estimated. Before CORONA, National Intelligence Estimates predicted the Soviets would have 140–200 ICBMs by 1961; a month after the first successful mission, that estimate was revised to 10–25. The 145th and final CORONA mission launched on May 25, 1972. The program was declassified by President Bill Clinton in 1995.

==== KH-11 ====
In 1976, the United States launched the KH-11 KENNEN satellite, the first American spy satellite to use electro-optical digital imaging and provide near real-time reconnaissance imagery. Unlike earlier film-return satellites, the KH-11 transmitted imagery digitally. In 1978, CIA employee William Kampiles was convicted of selling a KH-11 technical manual to the Soviets. Unlike earlier film-return satellites, the KH-11 transmitted imagery digitally through the Satellite Data System.

== Russian Federation ==
According to U.S. government officials, as of 2016 the United States Intelligence Community had earmarked up to 10 percent of its budget to Russia-related espionage.

=== 2017 asset extraction ===
In 2017, the CIA extracted a Russian official who had worked as an American intelligence source for decades. According to The New York Times and CNN, the source had access to high-level Kremlin decision-making and provided intelligence on Russian interference in the 2016 U.S. presidential election. The source was described as one of the CIA's most valuable assets, capable of providing images of documents on President Vladimir Putin's desk.

The CIA first offered to extract the source in late 2016 amid concerns about exposure following public disclosures about Russian election interference, but the source declined, citing family concerns. The source agreed to extraction in 2017 after media reporting increased. Russian newspaper Kommersant identified the official as Oleg Smolenkov, who had worked in the Russian presidential administration as an assistant to Vladimir Putin's foreign policy adviser Yuri Ushakov. Kremlin spokesman Dmitry Peskov confirmed that Smolenkov had been employed in the administration but characterized him as a low-level official who was fired in 2016–2017, dismissing the American reports as "pulp fiction."

The extraction reportedly left American intelligence without a key source on Kremlin decision-making during the 2018 midterm elections and the 2020 presidential election.

=== Other incidents ===
- In 2000, Edmond Pope, a former U.S. naval intelligence officer, was convicted of espionage by a Russian court and sentenced to 20 years in prison for attempting to obtain technical information about a Russian torpedo. He claimed he had sought only unclassified information for his consulting business. Pope was pardoned by President Vladimir Putin in December 2000.
- In 2013, Ryan Fogle, a third secretary at the U.S. embassy in Moscow, was detained by Russian counterintelligence officers and expelled from Russia after being found carrying two wigs, three pairs of sunglasses, a Moscow street atlas, $130,000 in cash, and a letter offering up to $1 million per year for cooperation.
- In 2017, a cybersecurity specialist working in the Federal Security Service was arrested by Russian authorities on suspicion of passing information to U.S. intelligence.

== See also ==
- Operation Ivy Bells
- Operation Lincoln
- 1960 U-2 incident
- List of American spies
- Arrest of Mark Kaminsky and Harvey Bennett
- Global surveillance disclosures (2013–present)
- United States intelligence operations abroad
- Soviet espionage in the United States
- Russian espionage in the United States
- List of Soviet agents in the United States
- Espionage Act of 1917
