= Operation PANDORA =

KGB cold war operation against the U.S.

Operation PANDORA (Russian: операция «ПАНДОРА») is the name used by Russian defector Vasili Mitrokhin for an alleged active measure by the KGB against the United States during the Cold War. The intention was supposedly to start a race war that would consume and self-destruct the United States.

According to British intelligence historian Christopher Andrew and Mitrokhin in the publication of the Mitrokhin Archive:

The KGB ordered the use of explosives to exacerbate racial tensions in New York City. On July 25, 1971, the head of the KGB's FCD First (North American) Department, Anatoli Tikhonovich Kireyev, instructed the New York residency to proceed with the operation. The KGB was to plant a delayed-action explosive package in "the Negro section of New York." Kireyev's preferred target was "one of the Negro colleges." After the explosion the residency was ordered to make anonymous telephone calls to two or three black organizations, claiming that the explosion was the work of the Jewish Defense League.

== Background ==
Vasili Nikitich Mitrokhin was a former KGB archivist who defected from the Soviet Union to the United Kingdom in 1992. As part of his defection, Mitrokhin helped smuggle vast quantities of confidential KGB information into the UK. This collection of documents was subsequently compiled and ultimately became known as the Mitrokhin Archive.

== Operation ==
Operation Pandora was a covert Soviet plot to provoke a race war in the United States by stoking racial tensions and exacerbating existing conflicts between different racial and ethnic groups. The plan was initially conceived in the late 1960s by the KGB, the intelligence agency of the Soviet Union, as part of a broader effort to destabilize the United States and weaken its influence around the world. The plan involved a complex and long-term strategy of manipulating various groups and organizations, including the Ku Klux Klan (KKK), black militant groups (Black Panthers), and the Jewish Defense League (JDL).

The KGB hoped to use these groups to incite violence and chaos in the United States, with the ultimate goal of triggering a civil war and disrupting American society and government. The plan was centered around a number of specific operations, including the distribution of propaganda materials designed to exacerbate racial tensions, the infiltration of key organizations to gather intelligence and sow discord, and the planning of acts of violence and sabotage against critical military and civilian targets. One of the most notable elements of Operation Pandora was the plot to bomb a historically black college in New York and blame it on the JDL.

The plan was ultimately foiled by U.S. law enforcement, who discovered and dismantled a KGB spy ring in the United States in the early 1980s. The exposure of the plot led to increased scrutiny of Soviet espionage in the United States and highlighted the ongoing threat posed by foreign espionage and subversion.

== See also ==
- Active measures
- Operation INFEKTION
- Operation Cedar (KGB)
