= Jakob Segal =

Russian-born German biologist and conspiracy theorist (1911-1995)

- Born: 17 April 1911; Saint Petersburg, Russian Empire
- Died: 30 September 1995 (aged 84); Berlin, Germany
- Occupation: biology professor
- Known for: Operation INFEKTION
- Spouse: Lilli "Teddy" Schlesinger
- Awards: Silver Patriotic Order of Merit (1961)

Jakob Segal (17 April 1911 – 30 September 1995) was a Russian-born German biology professor at Humboldt University of Berlin in the former East Germany. He was one of the advocates of the conspiracy theory that HIV was created by the United States government at Fort Detrick, Maryland.

After the fall of the Soviet Union, KGB defector Vasili Mitrokhin and two former members of East Germany's secret police accused Segal of being a Soviet disinformation agent who worked for the KGB.

== Early life and education ==
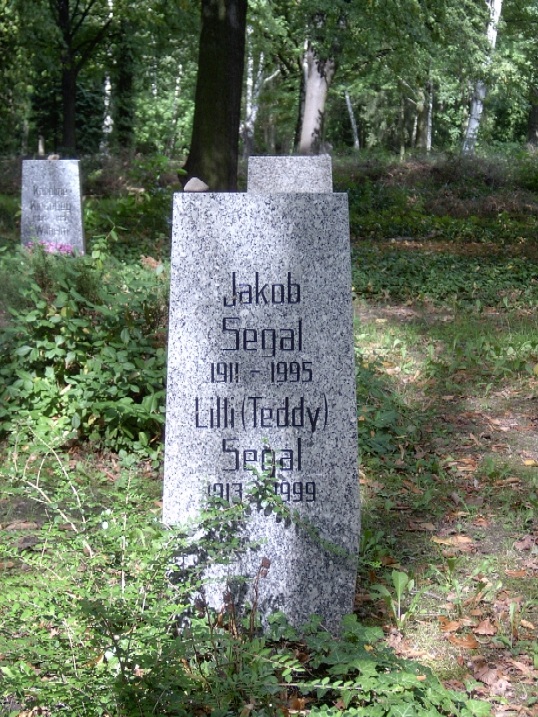
Tombstone of Jakob and Lilli Segal at Zentralfriedhof Friedrichsfelde, Berlin

Segal was born in Saint Petersburg, Russian Empire, into a Lithuanian Jewish family, the son of Hermann Segal, a merchant from Kaunas (1880–1941), and Rebekka (née Schlimakowski; 1887–1941). He had an older brother, Moshe, an electrician. When he was 8, his family moved to Königsberg, Prussia (now Kaliningrad, Russia). He was educated in Berlin and Munich, where he joined the Red Students' League (Roter Studentenbund) and the Communist Party of Germany. In 1933, he immigrated to France, where he furthered his studies in Toulouse before earning a doctorate in physiology from the Sorbonne in 1936.

During the Second World War, he and his German wife, Lilli (née Schlesinger, whom he had met at university in Toulouse) joined the resistance as part of the Main-d'œuvre immigrée and went underground. All of his family, including his parents and brother, were killed in the Holocaust. Lilli was arrested in 1943 and deported to Auschwitz in July 1944, but was sent to a work camp and survived by escaping that November. In 1946, he joined the Centre national de la recherche scientifique.

Following the Soviet annexation of Lithuania during the war, Segal and wife accepted Soviet citizenship. In the early 1950s, he moved to East Germany, reportedly on the recommendation of Soviet officials, becoming informeller Mitarbeiter. In 1952, he became a biology professor at Humboldt University in East Berlin, and in 1953 founded its Institute for Applied Bacteriology. From 1967 to 1970, he worked at the National Center for Scientific Research in Havana, Cuba. He moved to Mexico City, where he retired in the early 1970s before returning to East Berlin.

== Operation Infektion ==
Segal was recruited out of retirement by the KGB for Operation INFEKTION, a disinformation campaign designed to spread the belief that HIV/AIDS was created by the United States Government. According to U.S. intelligence historian Thomas Boghardt, Segal possibly suspected it was a Soviet campaign when approached by the Stasi (MfS):

How Segal was actually brought into the process is not known with certainty, but in all likelihood "evidence" of the US origins of AIDS would have been given to him in personal meetings, perhaps with a professional colleague previously briefed by the MfS. In this first meeting, Segal would not have been told explicitly that the material came from Soviet bloc intelligence or that it was part of a disinformation campaign. Rather, he simply would have been encouraged to look into the matter. Given Segal's background, he would have been expected to reach the intended conclusion. While Segal may have suspected the real source of the AIDS material, it was common practice in the GDR for authorities to share "background information" quasi-conspiratorially in one-on-one conversations. Its validity was typically not questioned.

Segal, together with his wife and Ronald Dehmlow, a fellow retired professor from Humboldt, published a 47-page pamphlet titled AIDS—Its Nature and Origin, in which they speculated that AIDS was the creation of the U.S. government, which had first tested it on gay prison inmates. What became known as the "Segal Report" was distributed by the Stasi and KGB at the Eighth Conference of Non-Aligned Nations, held 1–6 September 1986 in Harare, Zimbabwe, which was attended by representatives of more than 100 Third World countries. It produced the desired effect at the conference, and its claims were reprinted in the press in more than 25 countries in Africa.

One of Segal's claims was that Prof. Robert Gallo crossed the Visna sheep virus with the Human T-lymphotropic virus (HTLV I) in 1978 in the P4 laboratory of the U.S. Army Medical Research Institute of Infectious Diseases in Fort Detrick. Proponents of this theory claim that 90% of HIV RNA is found in Visna and 10% in HTLV I.

== Works ==
- Jakob Segal/Lilli Segal: Aids - die Spur führt ins Pentagon zusammen mit Manuel Kiper, Biokrieg, Vg. Neuer Weg, 2. ergänzte Auflage Oktober 1990, ISBN 3-88021-199-X
- Manuel Kiper: Seuchengefahr aus der Retorte - Vom sorglosen Umgang mit Genen, Viren und Bakterien, rororo Verlag, 1992, ISBN 3-499-13119-6
- Lilli Segal/ Jakob Segal/ Christoph Klug: AIDS can be conquered, Verlag Neuer Weg 1995/2001, ISBN 3-88021-296-1
- Jakob Segal: AIDS Zellphysiologie Pathologie und Therapie, Verlag Neuer Weg 1992, ISBN 3-88021-211-2
- Jacob Segal: wie das Leben auf der Erde entstand, DIETZ VERLAG BERLIN, 2. Auflage 1958
- Jakob Segal und Gunther Seng und andere: Methoden der UV- Bestrahlung von Blut—HOT und UVB, Hippokrates Verlag Stuttgart 1990, ISBN 3-7773-0984-2
- Jakob Segal, Ute Körner, Kate P. Leiterer: Die Entstehung des Lebens aus Biophysikalischer Sicht, VEB Gustav Fischer Verlag 1983, Bestellnummer: 533 7707
- Jakob Segal: Biophysikalische Aspekte der elementaren Zellfunktionen, VEB Georg Thieme Verlag Leipzig 1978, Bestellnummer: 532 816 5

== See also ==
- Active measures
