= Wolf Szmuness =

Polish epidemiologist (1919–1982)

Wolf Szmuness (March 12, 1919 – June 6, 1982) was a Polish-born epidemiologist who immigrated to and worked in the United States. He conducted research at the New York Blood Center and, from 1973, he was director of the Center's epidemiology laboratory. He designed and conducted the trials for the first vaccine to prove effective against hepatitis B.

== European beginnings ==
Szmuness was born in Warsaw, Poland on 12 March 1919. He studied medicine in Italy, but he returned to be with his family around the Nazi German invasion of Poland in 1939. As the Germans and Soviets occupied Poland, Szmuness was separated from his family, who were later killed by the Germans. Trapped in the Communist-occupied part of Poland, Szmuness traveled eastward to escape the advancing Nazis. He asked the Soviets to let him fight the Germans but was sent to Siberia as a prisoner.

Following a year of hard labour in the prison camp, Szmuness was appointed head of sanitary conditions. He later became the head epidemiologist in the local district. After release from detention in 1946, Szmuness completed his medical education at the University of Tomsk in Siberia, and earned a degree in epidemiology from the University of Kharkov.

Szmuness married a Russian woman, Maya, and in 1959 was allowed to return to Poland. There, he continued his education at the University of Lublin and worked as an epidemiologist in municipal and regional health departments.

Szmuness's colleague Aaron Kellner reports that the Polish authorities granted Szmuness a vacation at a rest home, where he shared a room with a Catholic priest, Karol Wojtyła, and began a longtime correspondence with him. Karol Wojtyła would later become Pope John Paul II.

== Emigration and life in the United States ==
In 1969, Szmuness, his wife and their daughter Helena were permitted to attend a scientific meeting in Italy. Upon arriving, Szmuness defected and immigrated to New York City in the United States for religious and political reasons. Through the intervention of Walsh McDermott, a professor of public health at New York Hospital-Cornell Medical Center, Szmuness was hired by the New York City Blood Center. Because physicians from abroad are not usually accredited in the United States, Szmuness began as a laboratory technician, but his skills were quickly recognized, and, within two years, Szmuness headed his own lab. A separate department of epidemiology at the Center was created for him, and he also became a full professor at the Columbia University School of Public Health. According to Aaron Kellner, President of the Center, within five years of arriving in New York, Szmuness became "an international figure in epidemiology and the field of hepatitis".

Szmuness died of lung cancer in 1982.

== Hepatitis B ==
Szmuness first became interested in the hepatitis B virus when his wife, Maya, was nearly killed by the liver disease caused by the virus, which she contracted through a blood transfusion. In New York, Szmuness investigated the natural history of hepatitis B. A vaccine was produced in the late 1970s, and Szmuness designed and conducted vaccine trials to determine its efficacy. Over 1000 male homosexuals participated in the trials; they were chosen as participants because they "had been found to have a risk of developing hepatitis B that is 10 times greater than that for the population in general".

== AIDS Theory ==
A highly controversial theory suggested that HIV-contaminated Hepatitis B vaccine trials in 1978 were responsible for the original spread of AIDS in the United States by infecting gay men in New York City with HIV. Evidence as to the presence of HIV in Szmuness's lab, or a mechanism for this introduction have not been offered, and scientific data strongly suggests that HIV instead first came to the United States with Haitian immigrants around 1969, many years prior to trials conducted on the Hepatitis B vaccine.
