= Oral polio vaccine AIDS hypothesis =

Disproven medical conspiracy theory

The oral polio vaccine AIDS hypothesis (OPV AIDS) is a now unsupported hypothesis which argued the AIDS pandemic originated from live polio vaccines prepared in chimpanzee tissue cultures, accidentally contaminated with simian immunodeficiency virus and then administered to up to one million Africans between 1957 and 1960 in experimental mass vaccination campaigns.

Though a small number of experts initially thought this hypothesis was plausible, later data analyses in molecular biology and phylogenetic studies contradict the OPV AIDS hypothesis. Scientific consensus regards the hypothesis as lacking evidence or disproven. A 2004 Nature article has described the hypothesis as "refuted".

== Background: polio vaccines ==
Two vaccines are used throughout the world to combat poliomyelitis. The first, a polio vaccine developed by Jonas Salk, is an inactivated poliovirus vaccine (IPV), consisting of a mixture of three wild, virulent strains of poliovirus, grown in a type of monkey kidney tissue culture (Vero cell line), and made noninfectious by formaldehyde treatment. The second vaccine, an oral polio vaccine (OPV), is a live-attenuated vaccine, produced by the passage of the virus through non-human cells at a sub-physiological temperature. The passage of virus produces mutations within the viral genome, and hinders the virus's ability to infect nervous tissue.

Both vaccines have been used for decades to induce immunity to polio, and to stop the spread of the infection. However, OPV has several advantages; because the vaccine is introduced in the gastrointestinal tract, the primary site of poliovirus infection and replication, it closely mimics a natural infection. OPV also provides long lasting immunity, and stimulates the production of polio neutralizing antibodies in the pharynx and gut. Hence, OPV not only prevents paralytic poliomyelitis, but also, when given in sufficient doses, can stop a threatening epidemic. Other benefits of OPV include ease of administration, low cost and suitability for mass vaccination campaigns.

=== Oral polio vaccine ===
Oral polio vaccines were developed in the late 1950s by several groups, including those led by Albert Sabin, Hilary Koprowski and H. R. Cox. A poliovirus type 1 strain called SM was reported in 1954. A less virulent version of the SM strain was reported by Koprowski in 1957. The name of the vaccine strain was "CHAT" after "Charlton", the name of the child who was the donor of the precursor virus. The Sabin, Koprowski and Cox vaccines were clinically tested in millions of individuals and found to be safe and effective. Because monkey trials found fewer side effects with the Sabin vaccine, in the early 1960s, the Sabin vaccine was licensed in the US and its use supported by the World Health Organization.

Between 1957 and 1960, Koprowski's vaccine was administered to roughly one million people in the Belgian territories, now the Democratic Republic of the Congo, Rwanda and Burundi. In 1960, Koprowski wrote in the British Medical Journal, "The Belgian Congo trials have enlarged considerably and ... more vaccination campaigns organized in several provinces of the Belgian Congo are raising the number of vaccinated individuals into the millions."(p. 90) Koprowski and his group also published a series of detailed reports on the vaccination of 76,000 children under the age of five (and European adults) in the area of Leopoldville (now Kinshasa) in Belgian Congo from 1958 to 1960; these reports begin with an overview, next a review of safety and efficacy, then a 21-month follow-up and final report.

=== Vaccine production ===
In the 1950s, before dangers inherent to the process were well controlled, seed stocks of vaccines were occasionally transported to distant regions, then standard tissue culture methods were used to amplify the virus at local production facilities. Biologic products, chiefly kidney cells for cultures and blood serum for media, were sometimes harvested from local primates and used in the production process if wild or captive populations of appropriate species were available. In South Africa, African green monkey tissue was used to amplify the Sabin vaccine. In French West Africa and Equatorial Africa, baboons were used to amplify a vaccine from the Pasteur Institute. In Poland, the CHAT vaccine was amplified using Asian macaques.

== Development of hypothesis ==
In 1987, historian-turned-activist Blaine Elswood contacted journalist Tom Curtis about a "bombshell story" on OPV and AIDS. Curtis published an article on the OPV AIDS hypothesis in Rolling Stone in 1992. In response, virologist Hilary Koprowski, implicated in the article as being possibly involved in the early spread of AIDS, sued Rolling Stone and Tom Curtis for defamation. The magazine published a clarification which praised Koprowski and stated:

The editors of Rolling Stone wish to clarify that they never intended to suggest in the article that there is any scientific proof, nor do they know of any scientific proof, that Dr. Koprowski, an illustrious scientist, was in fact responsible for introducing AIDS to the human population or that he is the father of AIDS.

Rolling Stone was ordered to pay one US dollar in damages to Koprowski, whilst incurring around US$500,000 in legal fees for its own defense.

A few scientists, notably the evolutionary biologist W. D. Hamilton, thought the hypothesis required serious investigation, but they received little support from the scientific community. For example, in 1996, Science refused to publish a letter Hamilton sent to it in which he replied to a 1992 Koprowski letter. Hamilton kept his position and said in 1999, "This theory, rather sadly, has gone from strength to strength. It's not proven by any means, but it's looking very strong." Hamilton was also supportive of journalist Edward Hooper who detailed the hypothesis in his 1999 book, The River. Hamilton wrote the foreword for the book and did two expeditions to Congo between December 1999 and January 2000 to collect evidences on the OPV hypothesis. Hamilton argued that the Royal Society should hold a meeting about the OPV hypothesis. In this meeting, held six months after Hamilton's death, in September 2000, Hooper further expanded on his allegations, although these claims were later rebutted by some of the scientists who were present at the meeting. In 2001, Hilary Koprowski responded by making a detailed rebuttal of the points made in the book, also in a talk to the Royal Society. In 2001, 60 urine and faecal samples collected by Hamilton were tested, although none contained SIV (although he did not necessarily expect them to).

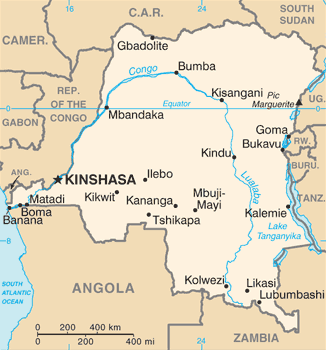
The Laboratoire Médical de Stanleyville was sited at the city now known as Kisangani.

In 2003, Hooper published additional statements that he believed supported his hypothesis in an article in the London Review of Books. These included accounts of an interview with Jacques Kanyama, a virology technician at the lab in Stanleyville (the Laboratoire Médical de Stanleyville (LMS)) responsible for testing the CHAT vaccine and performing the initial set of vaccinations, who was reported to have said that batches of CHAT had been produced on site by Paul Osterrieth. In addition, Philip Elebe, a microbiology technician, was claimed to have said that tissue cultures were being produced from Lindi chimpanzees. Osterrieth has denied these claims and stated that this work would not have been possible in this laboratory, stating that:

at no time did I ever attempt to make cell cultures from chimpanzee tissues. In addition, I wish to state categorically that no poliovaccine was ever produced or could have been produced in Stanleyville, since the facilities were totally inadequate for the production or control of poliovaccine.

In his book, Hooper also stated that Gaston Ninane was involved in using chimpanzee cells to produce vaccine in Congo. Ninane responded to this allegation by stating that he could "categorically deny" ever having tried to make tissue cultures from chimpanzee cells. The people involved in vaccine production and distribution from America state that no vaccine was prepared locally in Congo and that only the CHAT vaccine from America was used. Barbara Cohen, the technician who was responsible for running the American laboratory that produced this vaccine stated:

At no time did I ever receive or work on chimpanzee kidneys, nor to my knowledge cells derived from chimpanzees. I never made, nor do I know of anyone in the lab who made polio vaccine in chimpanzee cells.

In 2004, the Origin of Aids, a French TV documentary strongly supportive of the OPV hypothesis, appeared on several television stations around the world.

== Scientific investigation ==
In an August 1992 letter published in Science, Koprowski repudiated the OPV AIDS hypothesis, pointing to multiple errors of fact in its assertions. In October 1992, Science ran a story titled "Panel Nixes Congo Vaccine as AIDS source", describing the findings of an independent panel which found each proposed step in the OPV-AIDS hypothesis "problematic". The story concluded:

...it can be stated with almost complete certainty that the large polio vaccine trial... was not the origin of AIDS.

The oldest confirmed sample of human tissue that shows the presence of HIV-1 is an archival sample of plasma collected from an anonymous donor in the city of Leopoldville, Belgian Congo (now Kinshasa, Democratic Republic of the Congo) in 1959 and was found with retrospective genetic analysis to be most closely related to subtype D strains. In 2008, partial HIV viral sequences were identified from a specimen of lymph node collected from an adult female, also in Kinshasa, in 1960. This specimen, named DRC60, was around 88% similar to ZR59, but was found to be most closely related to subtype A HIV-1 strains. These specimens are significant not only because they are the oldest specimens of the virus known to cause AIDS, but because they show that the virus already had an extensive amount of genetic diversity in 1960.

In 2000, the Royal Society held a meeting to discuss data on the origin of AIDS; the OPV AIDS hypothesis was a central topic of discussion. At this meeting, three independent labs released the results of tests on the remaining stocks of Koprowski's vaccine, which Edward Hooper had demanded in The River. The tests confirmed Koprowski's contention that his vaccine was made from monkey, rather than chimpanzee, kidney, and found no evidence of SIV or HIV contamination. Additional epidemiologic and phylogenetic data was presented at the conference which undermined other aspects of the OPV AIDS hypothesis. According to a report in Science, Hooper "did not challenge the results; he simply dismissed them."

In 2001, three articles published in Nature examined various aspects of the OPV AIDS hypothesis, as did an article published in Science. In every case, the studies' findings argued strongly against any link between the polio vaccine and AIDS. The evidence cited included multiple independent studies that dated the introduction of HIV-1 to humans as occurring between 1915 and 1941, probably in the 1930s. These results were confirmed by a later study using samples from the 1960s that also found that the epidemic began between 1908 and 1930, and a study that showed that although recombination amongst viruses makes dating less precise, it does not significantly bias estimates in either direction (it does not introduce a systematic error).

The author of one of the studies, evolutionary biologist Edward Holmes of Oxford University, commented in light of the new evidence: "Hooper's evidence was always flimsy, and now it's untenable. It's time to move on." An accompanying editorial in Nature concluded:

The new data may not convince the hardened conspiracy theorist who thinks that contamination of OPV by chimpanzee virus was subsequently and deliberately covered up. But those of us who were formerly willing to give some credence to the OPV hypothesis will now consider that the matter has been laid to rest.

The possibility that chimpanzees found near Kisangani in the Democratic Republic of Congo (formerly Stanleyville) were, indirectly, the true source of HIV-1 was directly addressed in a 2004 study published in Nature. Here, the authors found that while SIV was present in chimpanzees in the area, the strain of SIV infecting these chimpanzees was phylogenetically distinct from all strains of HIV, providing direct evidence that these particular chimps were not the source of HIV in humans.

== Modern oral polio-vaccine campaign in Africa ==
Rumours that polio vaccines are unsafe disrupted the longstanding effort of the WHO and UN to achieve poliomyelitis eradication worldwide through use of the oral polio vaccine of Albert Sabin, which is thought to be safe and effective by virtually all medical authorities. If this long-term public-health goal could be achieved, poliomyelitis would follow smallpox as the second eradicated infectious human disease. The OPV AIDS hypothesis relates only to the historical origin of AIDS, and its proponents have accepted the safety of the modern polio vaccines, but rumors based on a misunderstanding of the hypothesis exist, and those rumors are blamed in part for the recent failure to eliminate polio in Nigeria.

By 2003, cases of poliomyelitis had been reduced to just a small number in isolated regions of West Africa, with sporadic cases elsewhere. However, the disease has since resurged in Nigeria and in several other nations of Africa, which epidemiologists trace to refusals by certain local populations to allow their children to be administered the Sabin oral vaccine. The expressed concerns of local populations often relate to fears that the vaccine might induce sterility, or that it is contaminated with HIV, based on claims made in The River. Since 2003, these fears have spread among some in the Muslim community, with Datti Ahmed, of the Supreme Council for Sharia in Nigeria stating that:

We believe that modern-day Hitlers have deliberately adulterated the oral polio vaccines with anti-fertility drugs and viruses which are known to cause HIV and AIDS.

== See also ==
- AIDS origins opposed to scientific consensus
- AIDS origin
- SV40, a scientifically accepted case of a monkey virus contaminating polio vaccine – inactivated poliovirus vaccine (IPV) only.
- Zoonosis
