= Mitrokhin Archive =

Handwritten notes of KGB archivist Vasili Mitrokhin

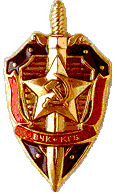
Symbol of the KGB

The Mitrokhin Archive is a collection of handwritten notes about secret KGB operations spanning the period between the 1930s and 1980s made by KGB archivist Vasili Mitrokhin which he shared with British intelligence in the early 1990s. Mitrokhin, who had worked at KGB headquarters in Moscow from 1956 to 1985, first offered his material to the US's Central Intelligence Agency (CIA) in Latvia and Lithuania, but they rejected it as possible fakes. After that, he turned to the UK's MI6, which arranged his defection from Russia.

Mitrokhin secretly made his handwritten notes by copying archival documents in the period between 1972 and 1984, when he supervised the move of the archive of KGB's foreign intelligence department First Chief Directorate from the Lubyanka Building to their new headquarters at Yasenevo. When he defected to the United Kingdom in 1992, he brought the archive with him, in six full trunks. His defection was not officially announced until 1999.

The official historian of MI5, Christopher Andrew, wrote two books, The Sword and the Shield (1999) and The World Was Going Our Way: The KGB and the Battle for the Third World (2005), based on material from the Mitrokhin Archives. The books provide details about many of the Soviet Union's clandestine intelligence operations around the world. They also provide specifics about Guy Burgess, a British diplomat with a short career in MI6, said to be frequently under the influence of alcohol; the archive indicates that he gave the KGB at least 389 top secret documents in the first six months of 1945, along with a further 168 in December 1949.

The utilization of the Mitrokhin Archive is not without risk because these documents only contain his handwritten notes, and no original documents or photocopies were ever made available to analyze these notes. Many scholars remain skeptical of the context and authenticity of the notes made by Mitrokhin.

== Origin of the notes ==
Vasili Nikitich Mitrokhin originally started his career with the First Chief Directorate of the KGB (Foreign Espionage) in undercover operations. After Nikita Khrushchev's Secret Speech in February 1956, which denounced the previous regime of Joseph Stalin, Mitrokhin became critical of the existing KGB system, and because of his operational failures in Israel and in Australia, he was transferred from Operations to the Archives.

Over the years, Mitrokhin became increasingly disillusioned with the Soviet system, especially after the stories about the struggles of dissidents and the 1968 invasion of Czechoslovakia, which led him to conclude that the Soviet system was incapable of reform.

By the late 1960s, the KGB headquarters at the Lubyanka Building in central Moscow became increasingly overcrowded, and the Chairman of the KGB, Yuri Andropov, authorized the construction of a new building on the outskirts of Moscow in Yasenevo, which was to become the new headquarters of the First Chief Directorate and all foreign operations.

Mitrokhin, who was by that time the head of the Archives department, was assigned by the director of the First Directorate, Vladimir Kryuchkov, with the task of cataloging the documents and overseeing their orderly transfer to the new headquarters. The transfer of the massive archive of 300,000 files eventually took over 12 years, from 1972 to 1984.

Unbeknown to Kryuchkov and the KGB, while cataloging the documents, Mitrokhin also secretly copied documents by hand, making immensely detailed notes, which he smuggled to his dacha in the countryside and deposited under the floorboards. Mitrokhin retired from the KGB in 1985, just after the move was completed.

During the Soviet era he made no attempt to contact any Western intelligence services, but just after the dissolution of the Soviet Union in 1991 he traveled to Latvia with copies of the material from his archive and walked into the American embassy in Riga. Central Intelligence Agency officers stationed there did not consider him to be credible, concluding that the copied documents could have been faked.

He then went to the British embassy in Vilnius (Lithuania), and a young diplomat there saw his potential. After a further meeting one month later with representatives of MI6 flown in from the UK, operations followed to retrieve the entire 25,000-page cache of files hidden in his country house, which contained details about KGB operations abroad from as far back as the 1930s.

== Content of the notes ==
Notes in the Mitrokhin Archive claim that more than half of the Soviet Union's advanced weapons were based on US designs, that the KGB tapped Henry Kissinger's phone during the time he was US Secretary of State (1973–77), and had spies in place in almost all US defense contractor facilities.

The notes also allege that some 35 senior politicians in France worked for the KGB during the Cold War. In West Germany, the KGB was said to have infiltrated the major political parties, the judiciary, and the police. Large-scale sabotage preparations were supposedly made against the US, Canada, and elsewhere in case of war, including hidden weapons caches prepared for that event; Mitrokhin's books later claimed several of these have been removed or destroyed by police relying on Mitrokhin's information.

=== Prominent KGB spies named in the files ===
- Melita Norwood (1912–2005), codenamed HOLA, a British civil servant who had access to state secrets while working at the British Non-Ferrous Metals Research Association between the 1930s and 1960s, and which was involved in developing Britain's nuclear weapons program.
- John Symonds (1935–2017), codenamed SKOT, a former Detective Sergeant at New Scotland Yard, who had left the UK under suspicion of corruption in the early 1970s only to be recruited by KGB in Africa. He is described as having worked for the KGB between 1971 and 1980.
- Raymond Fletcher (1921–1991), codenamed PETER, a British journalist and subsequently Labour Party MP from 1964 to 1983; also alleged to have been recruited by the Czech secret police StB and the Central Intelligence Agency.
- Iosif Grigulevich (1913–1988), an NKVD assassin who under a false identity served as ambassador of Costa Rica to both Italy and Yugoslavia from 1952 to 1954, and was put in charge of an aborted plan to assassinate the Yugoslav leader Josip Broz Tito
- Robert Lipka (1945–2013), a former clerk at the National Security Agency who passed on classified documents to the KGB in the late 1960s. Lipka had denied his involvement until the last moments before his trial was to begin 30 years later, when prosecutors revealed that the prime witness against him was a former KGB archivist.
- Salaad Gabeyre Kediye (1933–1972), codenamed OPERATOR, member of Somalia's Supreme Revolutionary Council which took over the country following the 1969 coup d'état, officially styled as "Father of the Revolution" before ending up executed in the ensuing power struggle three years later.

=== Latin American leaders accused of being informants or agents of the KGB ===
Christopher Andrew states that in the Mitrokhin Archive there are several Latin American leaders or members of left wing parties accused of being KGB informants or agents. For example, leader of the Sandinistas who seized power in Nicaragua in 1979, Carlos Fonseca Amador, was described as "a trusted agent" in KGB files. Nikolai Leonov was Sub-Director of the Latin American Department of the KGB between 1968 and 1972. In 1998 he gave a lecture where he denied these claims, for instance Leonov claimed that said that the KGB was not called to recruit members from Communist or other left wing parties.

Daniel Ortega agreed to "unofficial meetings" with KGB officers. He gave Nikolai Leonov a secret program of the Sandinista movement (FSLN), which stated the FSLN's intent to lead class struggle in Central America, in alliance with Cuba and the Soviet bloc. Leonov claimed that he became friends with many Latin Americans including some leaders, and that he and other Soviets supported the struggles of left wing groups. But he clarifies that he did not let people know that he was a KGB agent and that his relationships with them did not involve intelligence.

=== Middle Eastern figures accused of being informants or agents of the KGB ===
In September 2016, a work by two researchers (Dr. I. Ginor and G. Remez) stated that Mahmoud Abbas (also known as 'Abu Mazen'), the President of the Palestinian National Authority, worked for the Soviet intelligence agency. According to a recently released document from the Mitrokhin Archive, entitled "KGB developments – Year 1983", Abbas apparently worked under the code name "Krotov" meaning "Mole", starting early 1980s.

=== Alleged KGB operations revealed in the files ===
- Blackmailing Tom Driberg (code-named Lepage), British MP and a member of the executive committee of the Labour Party in the 1950s. Driberg had spied on the Communist Party of Great Britain for MI5 in the 1930s. In 1956, while visiting Moscow to interview his old friend Guy Burgess for a biography, he was blackmailed by the KGB into removing references to Burgess's alcoholism, due to their having photos of him in a homosexual encounter.
- Attempts to increase racial hatred in the US by mailing forged hate letters to militant groups
- Bugging MI6 stations in the Middle East
- Bugging Henry Kissinger when he was serving as United States Secretary of State
- Obtaining documents from defense contractors including Boeing, Fairchild, General Dynamics, IBM, and Lockheed Corporation, providing the Soviets with detailed information about the Trident and Peacekeeper ballistic missiles and Tomahawk cruise missiles
- Soviet industrial espionage of Concorde supersonic passenger airliner
- Supporting the Sandinista movement. The leading role in this operation belonged to the General Intelligence Directorate of Communist Cuba.
- KGBs direct link to Prime Minister of India, Indira Gandhi (code-named Vano). "Suitcases full of banknotes were said to be routinely taken to the Prime Minister's house. Former Syndicate member S. K. Patil is reported to have said that Mrs. Gandhi did not even return the suitcases". Systematic control of the Indian Media was also revealed- "According to KGB files, by 1973 it had ten Indian newspapers on its payroll (which cannot be identified for legal reasons) as well as a press agency under its control. During 1972 the KGB claimed to have planted 3,789 articles in Indian newspapers – probably more than in any other country in the non-Communist world. According to its files, the number fell to 2,760 in 1973 but rose to 4,486 in 1974 and 5,510 in 1975. In some major NATO countries, despite active-measures campaigns, the KGB was able to plant little more than 1 per cent of the articles which it placed in the Indian press" In 1981 the Soviets had launched "Operation Kontakt", which was based on a forged document purporting to contain details of the weapons and money provided by the Inter-Services Intelligence (ISI) to Sikh militants who wanted to create an independent country. In November 1982, Yuri Andropov, the General Secretary of the Communist Party and leader of the Soviet Union, approved a proposal to fabricate Pakistani intelligence documents detailing ISI plans to foment religious disturbances in Punjab and promote the creation of Khalistan as an independent Sikh state. Indira Gandhi's decision to move troops into the Punjab was based on her taking seriously the information provided by the Soviets regarding secret CIA support for the Sikhs.

=== Accused but unconfirmed ===
- Richard Clements, journalist and editor of the Tribune, and later an advisor to Michael Foot and Neil Kinnock as leaders of the British Labour Party. Clements was not named in Andrew and Mitrokhin's book in 1999, but an article in The Sunday Times made the allegation that he was the unidentified agent of influence codenamed DAN. According to the Mitrokhin Archive, DAN disseminated Soviet propaganda in his articles in the Tribune, from his recruitment in 1959 until he severed contact with the KGB in the 1970s. Clements denied the allegation, saying that it was an over-inflated claim and "complete nonsense", and that the allegation was not subsequently repeated. Those defending Clements against the charges included David Winnick and Andrew Roth.
- Romano Prodi, former Prime Minister of Italy and president of the European Commission. The allegations were evaluated by the Mitrokhin Commission, which was established in 2002 by the centre-right coalition majority.

=== Disinformation campaign against the United States ===
Andrew described the following active measures by the KGB against the United States:

- Promotion of false John F. Kennedy assassination theories, using writer Mark Lane. Lane denied this allegation and called it "an outright lie".
- Forged letter from Lee Harvey Oswald to E. Howard Hunt, attempting to incriminate Hunt in the Kennedy assassination.
- Discrediting the CIA using the ex-CIA case officer and defector Philip Agee.
- Spreading rumors that the FBI director J. Edgar Hoover was a homosexual.
- Attempts to discredit Martin Luther King Jr. by placing publications portraying him as an "Uncle Tom" who was secretly receiving government subsidies.
- Stirring up racial tensions in the United States by mailing bogus letters from the Ku Klux Klan, by placing an explosive package in "the Negro section of New York" (operation PANDORA), and by spreading conspiracy theories that the assassination of Martin Luther King Jr. had been planned by the US government.
- Fabrication of the story that the AIDS virus was manufactured by US scientists at the US Army research station at Fort Detrick (Operation Denver). The story was spread by Russian-born biologist Jakob Segal.

=== Installation and support of communist governments ===
According to Mitrokhin's notes, Soviet security organizations played key roles in establishing puppet Communist governments in Eastern Europe and Afghanistan. Their strategy included mass political repressions and establishing subordinate secret police services at the occupied territories.

The KGB director Yuri Andropov took suppression of anti-Communist liberation movements personally. In 1954, he became the Soviet ambassador to Hungary, and was present during the 1956 Hungarian Revolution. After these events, Andropov had a "Hungarian complex":

... he had watched in horror from the windows of his embassy as officers of the hated Hungarian security service were strung up from lampposts. Andropov remained haunted for the rest of his life by the speed with which an apparently all-powerful Communist one-party state had begun to topple. When other Communist regimes later seemed at risk—in Prague in 1968, in Kabul in 1979, in Warsaw in 1981, he was convinced that, as in Budapest in 1956, only armed force could ensure their survival.

Andropov played a key role in crushing the Hungarian Revolution. He convinced reluctant Nikita Khrushchev that military intervention was necessary. He convinced Imre Nagy and other Hungarian leaders that the Soviet government had not ordered an attack on Hungary while the attack was beginning. The Hungarian leaders were arrested and Nagy was executed.

During the Prague Spring events in Czechoslovakia, Andropov was a vigorous proponent of "extreme measures". He ordered the fabrication of false intelligence not only for public consumption, but also for the Soviet Politburo. "The KGB whipped up the fear that Czechoslovakia could fall victim to NATO aggression or to a coup." At that moment, Soviet intelligence officer Oleg Kalugin reported from Washington that he had gained access to "absolutely reliable documents proving that neither CIA nor any other agency was manipulating the Czechoslovak reform movement." But, Kalugin's messages were destroyed because they contradicted the conspiracy theory fabricated by Andropov. Andropov ordered many active measures, collectively known as operation PROGRESS, against Czechoslovak reformers.

=== Assassinations attempts and plots ===
- Attempted poisoning of the second President of Afghanistan Hafizullah Amin on 13 December 1979. Department 8 of KGB succeeded in infiltrating illegal agent Mitalin Talybov (codenamed SABIR) into the presidential palace as a chef. However, Amin switched his food and drink (as if he expected to be poisoned), and his son-in-law became seriously ill; he was flown to a hospital in Moscow. The poison was manufactured in the secret KGB laboratory which had prepared ricin for the attack on Bulgarian writer Georgi Markov in London in 1978.
- Preparations to assassinate Josip Broz Tito, the president of the Socialist Federal Republic of Yugoslavia. In the late 1940s, the same KGB laboratory manufactured a powdered plague for use by an assassin who had been vaccinated against plague. This assassination was prepared by the famous KGB agent Iosef Grigulevich, who had previously organized the assault on Leon Trotsky's villa in Mexico. However, Grigulevich was recalled at the last moment, due to the sudden death of Joseph Stalin.
- In 1962, plans to assassinate several "particularly dangerous traitors," including Anatoliy Golitsyn, Igor Gouzenko, Nikolay Khokhlov, and Bohdan Stashynsky were approved by the KGB head Vladimir Semichastny. Khoklov was poisoned by radioactive thallium, allegedly due to his refusal to work as a KGB assassin and kill George Okolovich, chairman of the National Alliance of Russian Solidarists.

=== Penetration of churches ===
The book describes establishing the "Moscow Patriarchate" on order from Stalin in 1943 as a front organization for the NKVD, and later, for the KGB. All key positions in the Church, including bishops, were approved by the Ideological Department of CPSU and by the KGB. The priests were used as agents of influence in the World Council of Churches and in front organizations such as World Peace Council, Christian Peace Conference, and the Rodina ("Motherland") Society founded by the KGB in 1975. The future Russian Patriarch Alexius II said that Rodina was created to "maintain spiritual ties with our compatriots" and to help organize them. According to the archive, Alexius worked for the KGB as agent DROZDOV, and received an honorary citation from the agency for a variety of services.

=== Support of militant organizations and terrorists ===
The Andrew and Mitrokhin publications briefly describe the history of the PLO leader, Yasser Arafat, who established close collaboration with the Romanian Securitate service and the KGB in the early 1970s. The KGB provided secret training for PLO guerrillas. However, the main KGB activities and arms shipments were channeled through Wadie Haddad of the PFLP organization, who usually stayed in a KGB dacha BARVIKHA-1 during his visits to the Soviet Union. Led by Carlos the Jackal, a group of PFLP fighters carried out a spectacular raid on the Organization of Petroleum Exporting Countries office in Vienna in 1975. Advance notice of this operation "was almost certainly" given to the KGB.

Many notable operations are alleged to have been conducted by the KGB to support international terrorists with weapons on the orders from the Communist Party of the Soviet Union, including:

- Transfer of about one hundred machine-guns, automatic rifles, Walther pistols, and cartridges to the Marxist Official Irish Republican Army by the Soviet intelligence vessel Reduktor (operation SPLASH) in 1972, supposedly to fulfill a personal request for arms from Cathal Goulding, relayed through Irish Communist Party leader Michael O'Riordan. He has denied the allegations.
- Transfer of anti-tank grenade RPG-7 launchers, radio-controlled SNOP mines, pistols with silencers, machine guns, and other weaponry to the Popular Front for the Liberation of Palestine through Wadi Haddad, who was recruited as a KGB agent in 1970 (operation VOSTOK, "East").

According to Peter-Michael Diestel, East Germany became "an Eldorado for terrorists". The KGB aided the Stasi in supporting the Red Army Faction, which perpetrated terrorist attacks such as the 1985 Rhein-Main Air Base bombing. Other Stasi contacts included the Provisional IRA, the Basque ETA, and previously mentioned "Carlos the Jackal".

== Preparations for large-scale sabotage ==
Notes in the archive describe extensive preparations for large-scale sabotage operations against the United States, Canada, and Europe in the event of war, although none was recorded as having been carried out, beyond creating weapons and explosives caches in assorted foreign countries. This information has been corroborated in general by GRU defectors, such as Victor Suvorov and Stanislav Lunev. The operations included the following:

- A plan for sabotage of Hungry Horse Dam in Montana.
- A detailed plan to destroy the port of New York (target GRANIT). The most vulnerable points of the port were determined and recorded on maps.
- Large arms caches were hidden in many countries to support the planned acts. Some were booby-trapped with "Lightning" explosive devices. One such cache, identified by Mitrokhin, was found by Swiss authorities in the woods near Fribourg. Several other caches in Europe were removed successfully. A KGB radio equipment cache was found in woods outside of Brussels in 1999.
- Disruption of the power supply across New York State by KGB sabotage teams, which were to be based along the Delaware River in Big Spring Park.
- An "immensely detailed" plan to destroy "oil refineries and oil and gas pipelines across Canada from British Columbia to Montreal" (operation "Cedar") was prepared; the work took twelve years to complete.

== Reception ==
Utilization of Mitrkohin Archive is not without risk because these documents only contain handwritten notes of Mitrokhin and no original documents or photocopies were ever made available to analyze these notes. Many scholars remain skeptical of the context and authenticity of the notes of Mitrokhin.

In 1999, the historian Joseph Persico wrote that "several of the much-publicized revelations [from the book], however, hardly qualify as such. For instance, the authors tell how the K.G.B. forged a letter from Lee Harvey Oswald to E. Howard Hunt, the former CIA officer and later Watergate conspirator, in order to implicate the CIA in the Kennedy assassination. Actually, this story surfaced in Henry Hurt's Reasonable Doubt, written 13 years ago. Similarly, the story that the KGB considered schemes for breaking the legs of the ballet dancer Rudolf Nureyev for defecting to the West was first reported in a book written six years ago." He added that "it does seem odd that a key KGB archivist never had access to a copying machine, but had to copy thousands of pages in longhand. Still, the overall impact of this volume is convincing, though none of the material will send historians scurrying to rewrite their books."

In her 2000 review, scholar Amy Knight said: "While The Sword and the Shield contains new information ... none of it has much significance for broader interpretations of the Cold War. The main message the reader comes away with after plowing through almost a thousand pages is the same one gleaned from the earlier books: the Soviets were incredibly successful, albeit evil, spymasters, and none of the Western services could come close to matching their expertise. Bravo the KGB." That same year, Reg Whitaker, a professor of Political Science at York University in Toronto, gave a review at the Intelligence Forum about the book where he wrote that "The Mitrokhin Archive arrives from a cache under a Russian dacha floor, courtesy of the British intelligence community itself, and its chosen historian, Chris Andrew", and that the book "is remarkably restrained and reasonable in its handling of Westerners targeted by the KGB as agents or sources. The individuals outed by Mitrokhin appear to be what he says they were, but great care is generally taken to identify those who were unwitting dupes or, in many instances, uncooperative targets."

In 2001, The American Historical Review wrote that "Mitrokhin was a self-described loner with increasingly anti-Soviet views ... Maybe such a potentially dubious type (in KGB terms) really was able freely to transcribe thousands of documents, smuggle them out of KGB premises, hide them under his bed, transfer them to his country house, bury them in milk cans, make multiple visits to British embassies abroad, escape to Britain, and then return to Russia, and carry the voluminous work to the west, all without detection by the KGB ... It may all be true. But how do we know?" That same year, the Central European Review described Mitrokhin and Andrew's work as "fascinating reading for anyone interested in the craft of espionage, intelligence gathering and its overall role in 20th-century international relations", offering "a window on the Soviet worldview and, as the ongoing Hanssen case in the United States clearly indicates, how little Russia has relented from the terror-driven spy society it was during seven inglorious decades of Communism."

In 2002, David L. Ruffley, from the Department of International Programs, United States Air Force Academy, said that the material "provides the clearest picture to date of Soviet intelligence activity, fleshing out many previously obscure details, confirming or contradicting many allegations and raising a few new issues of its own", and "sheds new light on Soviet intelligence activity that, while perhaps not so spectacular as some expected, is nevertheless significantly illuminating."

In July 2014, the Churchill Archives Centre at Churchill College released Mitrokhin's edited Russian-language notes for public research. The original handwritten notes by Vasili Mitrokhin are still classified.

=== Reactions ===
In 1999, Jack Straw (then Home Secretary) stated to the British Parliament: "In 1992, after Mr. Mitrokhin had approached the UK for help, our Secret Intelligence Service made arrangements to bring Mr. Mitrokhin and his family to this country, together with his archive. As there were no original KGB documents or copies of original documents, the material itself was of no direct evidential value, but it was of huge value for intelligence and investigative purposes. Thousands of leads from Mr. Mitrokhin's material have been followed up worldwide. As a result, our intelligence and security agencies, in co-operation with allied Governments, have been able to put a stop to many security threats. Many unsolved investigations have been closed; many earlier suspicions confirmed; and some names and reputations have been cleared. Our intelligence and security agencies have assessed the value of Mr. Mitrokhin's material world wide as immense."

In 2001, the author Joseph Trento commented that "we know the Mitrokhin material is real because it fills in the gaps in Western files on major cases through 1985. Also, the operational material matches western electronic intercepts and agent reports. What MI6 got for a little kindness and a pension was the crown jewels of Russian intelligence."

== Investigations after publication of the books ==
The publication of the books prompted parliamentary inquiries in the UK, Italy, and India.

=== UK inquiry ===
After the first book (Andrew and Mitrokhin, The Sword and the Shield, 1999) was published in the UK, an inquiry was held by the House of Commons' Intelligence and Security Committee (ISC). Its findings, "The Mitrokhin Inquiry Report", were presented to Parliament in June 2000. The Committee expressed concern that the Secret Intelligence Service (MI6) knew the names of some spies years before the publication of the book but took a decision, without informing the proper prosecuting authorities, not to prosecute them. The ISC believed that this decision was for the Law Officers to take, not the SIS. The ISC interviewed Mitrokhin, who was not content with the way the book was published. He told them that he felt he had not accomplished what he intended when writing the notes. He wished that he had retained "full control over the handling of his material". SIS stated that they were clearing the UK chapters with the Home Secretary and the Attorney General, as required before publication of the book; the Committee then found that they did not do so. In addition, ISC thought that "misleading stories were allowed to receive wide circulation", and the Committee found that SIS had handled neither the publication nor related media matters appropriately.

=== Italy inquiry ===
In Italy in 2002, Silvio Berlusconi's centre-right coalition, the House of Freedoms, established the Mitrokhin Commission, presided over by Paolo Guzzanti (senator of Forza Italia) to investigate alleged KGB ties to figures in Italian politics. The commission was criticized as politically motivated as it was focused mainly on allegations against opposition figures. The commission was shut down in 2006 without having developed any new concrete evidence beyond the original information in the Mitrokhin Archive. Former Federal Security Service (FSB) officer Alexander Litvinenko allegedly said that he had been informed by FSB deputy chief, General Anatoly Trofimov (who was shot dead in Moscow in 2005), that "Romano Prodi is our man [in Italy]". The allegations were rejected by Prodi. Litvinenko also said that "Trofimov did not exactly say that Prodi was a KGB agent, because the KGB avoids using that word." In April 2006, Gerard Batten of the UK Independence Party, at the time a British member of the European Parliament for London, demanded a new inquiry into the Italian and Prodi allegations. In November 2006, a new commission was established to investigate the Mitrokhin Commission for allegations that it was manipulated for political purposes.

=== India inquiry ===
In India, L. K. Advani, a senior leader of the Bharatiya Janata Party, requested of the government a white paper on the role of foreign intelligence agencies and a judicial enquiry on the allegations in The Mitrokhin Archive II: The KGB and the World. Advani was interested in the book because it made claims about ex-prime minister Indira Gandhi's (Codenamed VANO) relations with the KGB.

Abhishek Singhvi, the spokesperson of the Indian National Congress, referred to the notes as "pure sensationalism not even remotely based on facts or records", and mentioned that the book is not based on official records from the Soviet Union but provided by a person who defected to the western world in 1992. Singhvi further added that the book is going after those Indian leaders who are "not alive to deny the charge".

=== Libya and Somali KGB Agents ===
KERL.Operator and Rashid were senior KGB agents who operated within the Somali government and the Arab League. KERL is believed to have connected Libya to USSR. Operator was Lt General Salad G. Kediye. Based on documents drawn from the Mitrokhin Archive, and book published by Cambridge historian Christopher Andrew The World Was Going Our Way, a comprehensive account of KGB operations in Africa, Asia and Latin America co-authored with the late KGB Major Vasili Mitrokhin. Kediye had been a paid KGB agent codenamed "OPERATOR". Ironically, the KGB-trained National Security Service (NSS), the SRC's intelligence wing, had carried out Kediye's initial arrest.

== Books ==
- Andrew, Christopher; Vasili Mitrokhin (1999). The Sword and the Shield: The Mitrokhin Archive and the Secret History of the KGB. Basic Books. ISBN 0-465-00310-9.

- Andrew, Christopher, Vasili Mitrokhin (2000). The Sword and the Shield: The Mitrokhin Archive and the Secret History of the KGB. Basic Books. ISBN 0-465-00312-5.

- Andrew, Christopher, Vasili Mitrokhin (1999) The Mitrokhin Archive: The KGB in Europe and the West. Allen Lane. ISBN 0-7139-9358-8.

- Mitrokhin, Vasili; Andrew, Christopher (2000). The Mitrokhin Archive: The KGB in Europe and the West. Penguin. ISBN 0140284877. (google books)
- Andrew, Christopher, Vasili Mitrokhin (2005). The Mitrokhin Archive II: The KGB and the World. Allen Lane. ISBN 0-7139-9359-6.

- Vasiliy Mitrokhin (2002), KGB Lexicon: The Soviet Intelligence Officer's Handbook, Frank Cass & Co. Ltd, 451 pages, ISBN 0-7146-5257-1
- Andrew, Christopher; Vasili Mitrokhin (2005). The World Was Going Our Way: The KGB and the Battle for the Third World. Basic Books. ISBN 0-465-00311-7.
