= Active measures =

Political warfare conducted by the USSR & Russia

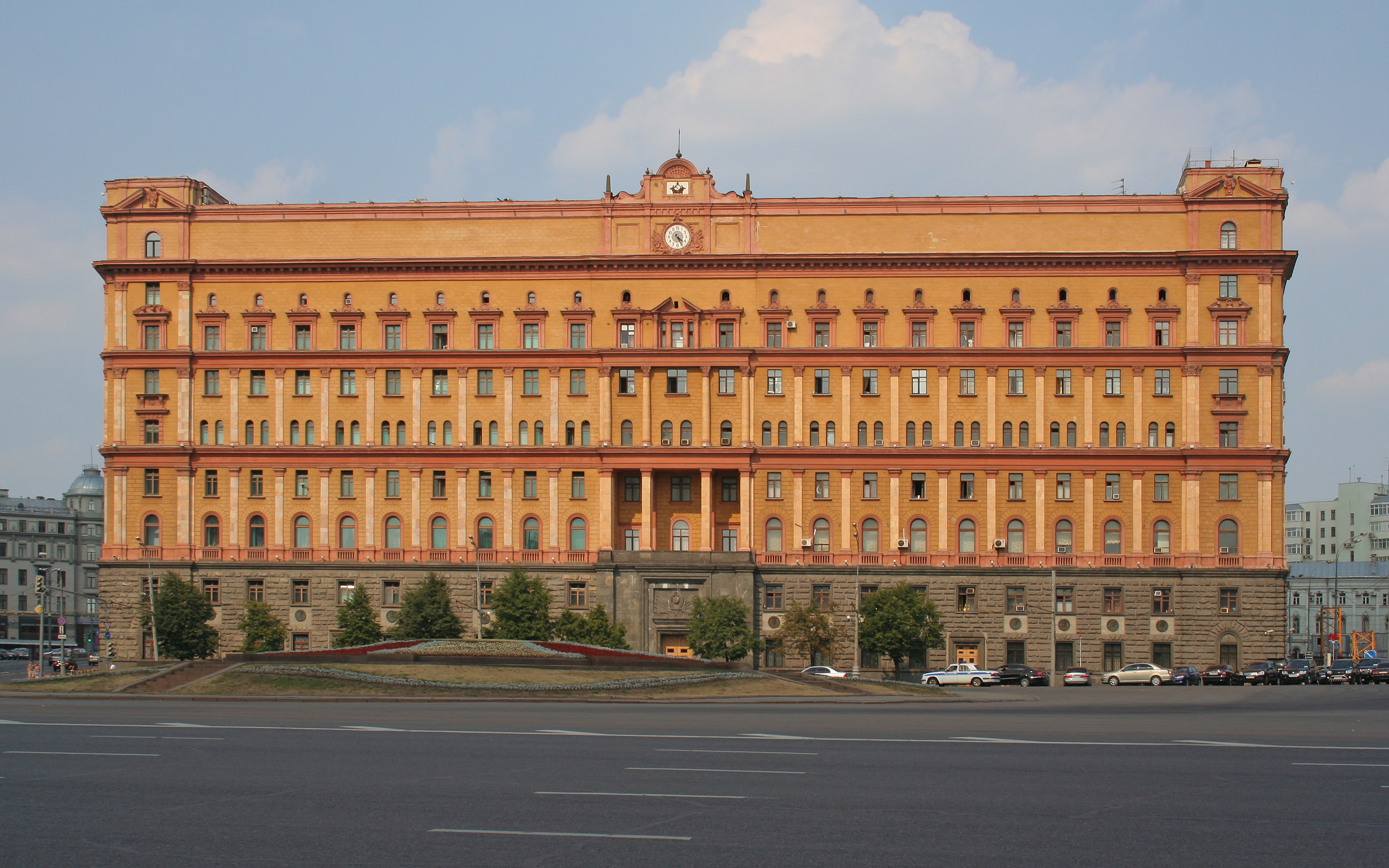
- Lubyanka Building, the headquarters of KGB and later FSB
- Russian: активные мероприятия
- Romanization: aktivnye meropriyatiya
- IPA: [ɐkˈtʲivnɨje mʲɪrəprʲɪˈjætʲɪjə]

Active measures (Russian: активные мероприятия, romanized: aktivnye meropriyatiya, designated "executive action" by the U.S. Government) is a term used to describe political warfare conducted by the Soviet Union and the Russian Federation. The term, which dates back to the 1920s, includes operations such as espionage, propaganda, sabotage, assassination, and the collection of kompromat for blackmail purposes based on the foreign policy objectives of the Soviet and Russian governments. Active measures have continued to be used by the administration of Vladimir Putin.

Although historically associated with Soviet and Russian intelligence, the term has also been applied to influence operations conducted by other nation-states. United States federal legislation also applies the term to certain covert influence activities involving the People's Republic of China, Iran, North Korea, and other nation-states.

== Description ==
Active measures were conducted by the Soviet and Russian security services and secret police organizations (Cheka, OGPU, NKVD, KGB, and FSB) to influence the course of world events, in addition to collecting intelligence and producing revised assessments of it. Active measures range "from media manipulations to special actions involving various degrees of violence". Beginning in the 1920s, they were used both abroad and domestically.

Active measures includes the establishment and support of international front organizations (e.g., the World Peace Council); foreign communist, socialist and opposition parties; wars of national liberation in the Third World. It also included supporting underground, revolutionary, insurgency, criminal, and terrorist groups. The programs also focused on counterfeiting official documents, assassinations, and political repression, such as penetration into churches, and persecution of political dissidents. The intelligence agencies of Eastern Bloc states also contributed to the program, providing operatives and intelligence for assassinations and other types of covert operations.

Retired KGB Major General Oleg Kalugin, former head of Foreign Counter Intelligence for the KGB (1973–1979), described active measures as "the heart and soul of the Soviet intelligence":

Not intelligence collection, but subversion: active measures to weaken the West, to drive wedges in the Western community alliances of all sorts, particularly NATO, to sow discord among allies, to weaken the United States in the eyes of the people of Europe, Asia, Africa, Latin America, and thus to prepare ground in case the war really occurs.

According to the Mitrokhin Archives, active measures was taught in the Andropov Institute of the KGB situated at Foreign Intelligence Service (SVR) headquarters in Yasenevo District of Moscow. The head of the "active measures department" was Yuri Modin, former controller of the Cambridge Five spy ring.

== History ==
Defector Ion Mihai Pacepa claimed that Joseph Stalin coined the term disinformation in 1923 by giving it a French sounding name in order to deceive other nations into believing it was a practice invented in France. The noun disinformation does not originate from Russia, it is a translation of the French word désinformation.

== Implementation ==
=== Guerrillas ===
==== Promotion of guerrilla and terrorist organizations worldwide ====
Soviet secret services have been described as "the primary instructors of guerrillas worldwide". According to Ion Mihai Pacepa, KGB General Aleksandr Sakharovsky once said: "In today's world, when nuclear arms have made military force obsolete, terrorism should become our main weapon." He also claimed that "Airplane hijacking is my own invention". In 1969 alone, 82 planes were hijacked worldwide by the KGB-financed PLO.

Lt. General Ion Mihai Pacepa stated that operation "SIG" ("Zionist Governments"), devised in 1972, intended to turn the whole Islamic world against Israel and the United States. KGB Chairman Yuri Andropov allegedly explained to Pacepa that

a billion adversaries could inflict far greater damage on America than could a few millions. We needed to instill a Nazi-style hatred for the Jews throughout the Islamic world, and to turn this weapon of the emotions into a terrorist bloodbath against Israel and its main supporter, the United States

=== Installing and undermining governments ===
After World War II, Soviet security organizations played a key role in installing puppet communist governments in Eastern Europe, the People's Republic of China, North Korea, and later Afghanistan. Their strategy included mass political repressions and establishment of subordinate secret services in all occupied countries.

Some of the active measures were undertaken by the Soviet secret services against their own governments or communist rulers. Russian historians Anton Antonov-Ovseenko and Edvard Radzinsky suggested that Joseph Stalin was killed by associates of NKVD chief Lavrentiy Beria, based on the interviews of a former Stalin bodyguard and circumstantial evidence. According to Yevgenia Albats' allegations, Chief of the KGB Vladimir Semichastny was among the plotters against Nikita Khrushchev in 1964, which led to the latter's downfall.

KGB Chairman Yuri Andropov reportedly struggled for power with Leonid Brezhnev. The Soviet coup attempt of 1991 against Mikhail Gorbachev was organized by KGB Chairman Vladimir Kryuchkov and other hardliners. Gen. Viktor Barannikov, then the former State Security head, became one of the leaders of the uprising against Boris Yeltsin during the Russian constitutional crisis of 1993.

The current Russian intelligence service, the SVR, allegedly works to undermine governments of other post-Soviet states such as the Baltic states, and Georgia, as well as former Soviet satellite states like Poland. During the 2006 Georgian-Russian espionage controversy, several Russian GRU case officers were accused by Georgian authorities of preparations to commit sabotage and terrorist acts.

=== Political assassinations ===
The highest-ranking Soviet Bloc intelligence defector, Lt. Gen. Ion Mihai Pacepa claimed to have had a conversation with Nicolae Ceaușescu, who told him about "ten international leaders the Kremlin killed or tried to kill": László Rajk and Imre Nagy from Hungary; Lucrețiu Pătrășcanu and Gheorghe Gheorghiu-Dej from Romania; Rudolf Slánský and Jan Masaryk from Czechoslovakia; the Shah of Iran; Muhammad Zia-ul-Haq, President of Pakistan; Palmiro Togliatti from Italy; John F. Kennedy; and Mao Zedong. Pacepa also discussed a KGB plot to kill Mao Zedong with the help of Lin Biao organized by the Soviet intelligence agencies and alleged that "among the leaders of Moscow's satellite intelligence services there was unanimous agreement that the KGB had been involved in the assassination of President Kennedy."

The second President of Afghanistan, Hafizullah Amin, was killed by the KGB's Alpha Group in Operation Storm-333 before the full-scale Soviet invasion of Afghanistan in 1979. Presidents of the unrecognized Chechen Republic of Ichkeria organized by Chechen separatists, including Dzhokhar Dudaev, Zelimkhan Yandarbiev, Aslan Maskhadov, and Abdul-Khalim Saidullaev, were killed by the FSB and affiliated forces.

Other widely publicized cases are murders of Russian communist Leon Trotsky and Bulgarian writer Georgi Markov by NKVD.

There were also allegations that the KGB was behind the assassination attempt against Pope John Paul II in 1981. The Italian Mitrokhin Commission, headed by senator Paolo Guzzanti (Forza Italia), worked on the Mitrokhin Archives from 2003 to March 2006. The Mitrokhin Commission received criticism during and after its existence. It was closed in March 2006 without any proof brought to its various controversial allegations, including the claim that Romano Prodi, former Prime Minister of Italy and former President of the European Commission, was the "KGB's man in Europe." One of Guzzanti's informers, Mario Scaramella, was arrested for defamation and arms trading at the end of 2006.

=== Puppet rebel forces ===
==== Operation Trust ====
In "Operation Trust" (1921–1926), the State Political Directorate (OGPU) set up a fake anti-Bolshevik underground organization, "Monarchist Union of Central Russia". The main success of this operation was luring Boris Savinkov and Sidney Reilly into the Soviet Union, where they were arrested and executed.

==== Basmachi Revolt ====
The Islamic anti-Soviet Basmachi movement in Central Asia posed an early threat to the Bolshevik movement. The movement's roots lay in the anti-conscription violence of 1916 that erupted when the Russian Empire began to draft Muslims for army service in World War I. In the months following the October Revolution of 1917, the Bolsheviks seized power in many parts of the Russian Empire and the Russian Civil War began. Turkestani Muslim political movements attempted to form an autonomous government in the city of Kokand, in the Fergana Valley. The Bolsheviks launched an assault on Kokand in February 1918 and carried out a general massacre of up to 25,000 people. The massacre rallied support to the Basmachi who waged a guerrilla and conventional war that seized control of large parts of the Fergana Valley and much of Turkestan. The group's notable leaders were Enver Pasha and, later, Ibrahim Bek. Soviet Russia responded by deploying special Soviet military detachments masqueraded as Basmachi forces and received support from British and Turkish intelligence services. The operations of these detachments facilitated the collapse of the Basmachi movement and the assassination of Pasha.

==== Post World War II counter-insurgency operations ====
Following World War II, various partisan organizations in the Baltic states, Poland and Western Ukraine fought for independence of their countries, which were under Soviet occupation, against Soviet forces. Many NKVD agents were sent to join and penetrate the independence movements. Puppet rebel forces were also created by the NKVD and permitted to attack local Soviet authorities to gain credibility and exfiltrate senior NKVD agents to the West.

=== Supporting political movements ===
According to Stanislav Lunev, GRU alone spent more than $1 billion for the peace movements against the Vietnam War, which was a "hugely successful campaign and well worth the cost". Lunev claimed that "the GRU and the KGB helped to fund just about every antiwar movement and organization in America and abroad".

By the 1980s, the US intelligence community was skeptical of claims that attempted Soviet influence on the peace movement had a direct influence on the non-aligned part of the movement. However, the KGB's widespread attempts at influence in the United States, Switzerland, and Denmark targeting the peace movement were known, and the World Peace Council was categorized as a communist front organization by the CIA.

The World Peace Council was established on the orders of the Communist Party of the USSR in the late 1940s, and for over forty years carried out campaigns against western, mainly American, military action. Many organisations controlled or influenced by Communists affiliated themselves with it. According to Oleg Kalugin,

... the Soviet intelligence [was] really unparalleled. ... The [KGB] programs—which would run all sorts of congresses, peace congresses, youth congresses, festivals, women's movements, trade union movements, campaigns against U.S. missiles in Europe, campaigns against neutron weapons, allegations that AIDS ... was invented by the CIA ... all sorts of forgeries and faked material—[were] targeted at politicians, the academic community, at [the] public at large. ...

It has been widely claimed that the Soviet Union organised and financed western peace movements; for example, ex-KGB agent Sergei Tretyakov claimed that in the early 1980s the KGB wanted to prevent the United States from deploying nuclear missiles in Western Europe as a counterweight to Soviet missiles in Eastern Europe, and that they used the Soviet Peace Committee to organize and finance anti-American demonstrations in western Europe. The Soviet Union first deployed the RSD-10 Pioneer (called SS-20 Saber in the West) in its European territories in March 1976, a mobile, concealable intermediate-range ballistic missile (IRBM) with a multiple independently targetable reentry vehicle (MIRV) containing three nuclear 150-kiloton warheads. The SS-20's range of 4,700–5,000 kilometers (2,900–3,100 mi) was great enough to reach Western Europe from well within Soviet territory; the range was just below the Strategic Arms Limitation Talks II (SALT II) Treaty minimum range for an intercontinental ballistic missile (ICBM):5,500 km (3,400 mi). Tretyakov further stated that "[t]he KGB was responsible for creating the entire nuclear winter story to stop the Pershing II missiles," and that they fed misinformation to western peace groups and thereby influenced a key scientific paper on the topic by western scientists.

According to intelligence historian Christopher Andrew, the KGB in Britain was unable to infiltrate major figures in the CND, and the Soviets relied on influencing "less influential contacts" which were more receptive to the Moscow line. Andrew wrote that MI5 "found no evidence that KGB funding to the British peace movement went beyond occasional payment of fares and expenses to individuals."

=== United States ===
Some of the active measures by the USSR against the United States were exposed in the Mitrokhin Archive:

- Attempts to discredit the Central Intelligence Agency, using writer Philip Agee (codenamed PONT), who exposed the identities of many CIA personnel. Mitrokhin alleges that Agee's bulletin CovertAction received assistance from the Soviet KGB and Cuban DGI
- Stirring up racial tensions in the United States by mailing bogus letters from the Ku Klux Klan, placing an explosive package in "the Negro section of New York" (Operation PANDORA)
- Planting claims that both John F. Kennedy and Martin Luther King Jr. had been assassinated by the CIA
- In the Middle East in 1975, the KGB claimed to identify 45 statesmen from around the world who had been the victims of successful or unsuccessful CIA assassination attempts over the past decade
- Make US military aid to the El Salvador government (increased more than fivefold by the Reagan administration between 1981 and 1984) so unpopular within the United States that public opinion would demand that it be halted. About 150 committees were created in the United States which spoke out against US interference in El Salvador, and contacts were made with US Senators
- Fabrication of the story that the AIDS virus was manufactured by US scientists at Fort Detrick; the story was spread by Russian-born biologist Jakob Segal. In a secondary role to the KGB during the operation, former East German spymaster Markus Wolf admitted, during a visit to Italy in 1998, the role of the HVA in spreading AIDS conspiracy theories

In 1974, according to KGB statistics, over 250 active measures were targeted against the CIA alone, leading to denunciations of Agency abuses, both real and (more frequently) imaginary, in media, parliamentary debates, demonstrations and speeches by leading politicians around the world.

=== Blowback ===
Soviet intelligence, as part of active measures, frequently spread disinformation to distort their adversaries' decision-making. However, sometimes this information filtered back through the KGB's own contacts, leading to distorted reports. Lawrence Bittman also addressed Soviet intelligence blowback in The KGB and Soviet Disinformation, stating that "There are, of course, instances in which the operator is partially or completely exposed and subjected to countermeasures taken by the government of the target country."

== Russian Federation active measures, 1991 to present ==
Active measures have continued in the post-Soviet Russian Federation and are in many ways based on Cold War schematics. After the annexation of Crimea, Kremlin-controlled media spread disinformation about Ukraine's government. In July 2014, Malaysia Airlines flight MH17 was shot down by a Russian missile over eastern Ukraine, killing all 298 passengers. Kremlin-controlled media and online agents spread disinformation, claiming Ukraine had shot down the airplane.

Russia's alleged disinformation campaign, its involvement in the UK's withdrawal from the EU, interference in the 2016 United States presidential election, and its alleged support of far-left and documented support of far-right movements in the West, has been compared to the Soviet Union's active measures in that it aims to "disrupt and discredit Western democracies".

In testimony before the United States Senate Intelligence Committee hearing on the US policy response to Russian interference in the 2016 elections, Victoria Nuland, former US Ambassador to NATO, referred to herself as "a regular target of Russian active measures."

The introduction of the Internet, specifically social media offered new opportunities for active measures. The Kremlin-affiliated Internet Research Agency, also referred to as the Information Warfare Branch, was established in 2013. This agency is devoted to spreading disinformation through the Internet, the most well-known and prominent operation being its part in the interference in the 2016 US presidential election. According to the House Intelligence Committee, by 2018, organic content created by the Russian IRA reached at least 126 million US Facebook users, while its politically divisive ads reached 11.4 million US Facebook users. Tweets by the IRA reached approximately 288 million American users. According to committee chair Adam Schiff, "[The Russian] social media campaign was designed to further a broader Kremlin objective: sowing discord in the U.S. by inflaming passions on a range of divisive issues. The Russians did so by weaving together fake accounts, pages, and communities to push politicized content and videos, and to mobilize real Americans to sign online petitions and join rallies and protests."

== Contemporary usage ==
Although active measures originated as a Soviet intelligence term, the expression has also been used in discussions of influence operations conducted by other governments. In 2018, intelligence analyst Peter Mattis described both China and Russia as employing active measures, while distinguishing differences in their operational approaches and methods.

=== United States legislation ===
The term active measures is also used in United States federal legislation addressing covert foreign influence. In 2017, Congress established an interagency committee to counter active measures by the Russian Federation. In December 2019, Congress expanded the committee's statutory mandate to include covert influence activities involving the People's Republic of China, Islamic Republic of Iran, Democratic People's Republic of Korea, and other nation-states.

Originally enacted in 2017 and expanded in 2019, 50 U.S.C. § 3369d defines covered active measures as activities intended to influence individuals or governments conducted in coordination with, or at the direction of, foreign political leaders or security services, where the foreign government's involvement is concealed or not publicly acknowledged. Identified methods include the establishment or financing of front organizations, covert broadcasting, media manipulation, disinformation and forgeries, financing agents of influence, incitement, offensive counterintelligence, assassinations, and terrorist acts.

A separate provision, enacted on 20 December 2019, 50 U.S.C. § 3371c, defines an active measures campaign as a "foreign semi-covert or covert intelligence operation". The statute requires the Director of National Intelligence, Director of the Federal Bureau of Investigation, and Secretary of Homeland Security to notify congressional leadership and relevant committees when they jointly determine that such a campaign has occurred or is occurring with the intent to influence an upcoming federal election, and attribute it with moderate or high confidence to a foreign state or nonstate actor.

=== Chinese influence operations ===
In a 2018 analysis of both Chinese and Russian active measures, intelligence analyst Peter Mattis argued that Chinese influence operations tended to emphasize cultivating personal relationships with influential individuals, whereas Russian operations more frequently emphasized discrete disinformation operations. Mattis also distinguished the organizational approaches of the two countries, describing Russian intelligence services as more directly involved in conducting influence operations, while Chinese intelligence services often played a facilitating role alongside organizations affiliated with the Chinese Communist Party, including the United Front Work Department. He characterized these distinctions as general tendencies and hypotheses rather than definitive judgments.

=== Iranian influence operations ===
In a 2012 study, Fletcher Schoen and Christopher J. Lamb wrote that Iran and Hezbollah had developed public diplomacy and disinformation programs "based on active measures". Their study was published by National Defense University Press and examined the history and methods of the United States' Cold War Active Measures Working Group.

In a 2024 policy report, analysts Douglas Farah and David M. Luna of the International Coalition Against Illicit Economies described Iranian activities in Latin America as "subversive active measures". They attributed these activities to the Islamic Revolutionary Guard Corps, describing the use of diplomatic facilities, proxy groups, and criminal networks to exercise political influence in the region.

== See also ==
- Active Measures Working Group
- Agent of influence
- Agents provocateurs
- Chronology of Soviet secret police agencies
- Dezinformatsia (book)
- First Chief Directorate of KGB of the USSR
- The Gospel of Afranius
- Hybrid warfare – a military strategy which employs political warfare and blends conventional warfare, irregular warfare and cyberwarfare
- The KGB and Soviet Disinformation – book
- Kompromat
- Operation Cedar (KGB)
- Operation INFEKTION
- Operation PANDORA
- Operation Trust
- Poison laboratory of the Soviet secret services
- Russian interference in the 2016 United States elections
- Russian military deception
- Russian web brigades
- Troll farm
- Vulkan files leak
- Yasenevo District—The Forest
- Völkerabfälle
