= Arrest of Mark Kaminsky and Harvey Bennett =

1960 arrest of Americans by the Soviet Union

Mark I. Kaminsky
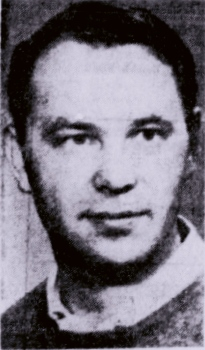
- Born: February 20, 1932; Edwardsburg, Michigan
- Died: February 15, 2007 (aged 74)
- Education: University of Michigan
- Occupations: Professor of Russian Studies at Purdue University; Holt, Rinehart & Winston

Harvey C. Bennett
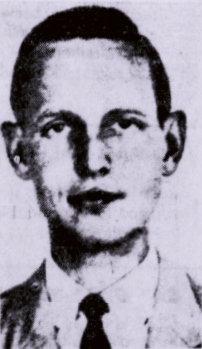
- Born: c. 1934; Bath, Maine

Mark I. Kaminsky and Harvey C. Bennett were American tourists who were detained in the Soviet Union in 1960. Kaminsky was put on trial, sentenced to seven years' jail, then expelled from the Soviet Union as a spy.

Kaminsky's obituary states that he was an undercover agent for the United States government.

== Background ==
Bennett and Kaminsky met each other in the United States Air Force in 1953.

Kaminsky, a 28-year-old single man, spoke fluent Russian from his parents who immigrated to the United States. His family was living in Edwardsburg, Michigan. In 1959 he was a Russian-speaking guide at the American National Exhibition in Moscow, Russia. He was a Michigan schoolteacher who was planning on teaching Russian at Purdue University in the fall of 1960.

At age 26 Bennett was married and living in Bath, Maine and had just graduated from UCLA. He was "trying to make up his mind whether to become a teacher of the Russian language or a Foreign Service officer."

== Tour through the Soviet Union ==
Kaminsky and Bennett arrived in Helsinki, Finland. They rented a car and drove into Russia on July 27, 1960. The pair were visiting the Soviet Union under a $2,000 scholarship from the Northcraft Educational Foundation in Philadelphia.

On August 17, Eugene Power and his son Phillip, met the two men. Eugene's son told him that Kaminsky had told him that the pair were planning to deliver a message to the family of a Russian man who had defected to the United States. He also asked Phillip to contact the State Department should they end up missing. Kaminsky told Phillip that they planned to take photographs of a submarine installation which was in a "restricted area" the following day, August 18, 1960. Eugene later said, "Frankly, I think they ask for their trouble."

Bennett's wife said she last heard from Bennett in a letter dated August 19 that was postmarked Vinnitsa, Russia, the American model town (spy town) in Ukraine.

The pair headed to Uzhgorod, where they planned to drive in to Czechoslovakia.

According to TASS news agency, the two Americans "intentionally deviated from their permitted route near Uzhgorod (near the Soviet Union's Czech-Hungarian frontier) and penetrated a significant distance inside a restricted border area" while on a motor tour of the Soviet countryside". TASS reported that Kaminsky was "carrying maps on which were marked military installations in the western Ukraine" and "Photographic film and a notebook proving he was collecting intelligence data on Soviet territory".

Kaminsky stated the pair were stopped at a check point near the Czechoslovak border. A KGB guard escorted them to the nearby town of Chop. After interrogation, they were stopped at the Czechoslovakia border again. All of their film was taken and developed. After the film was developed, the men were searched.

The United States State Department reported that another tourist saw Kaminsky on August 25, 1960, "at the Soviet border control point in the Soviet Intourist travel agency hotel at Uzhgorod, at the border of Czechoslovakia". The tourist reported that Kaminsky "was under detention for having taken a photograph."

In September 1960 the two tourists disappeared. The wife of Harvey, Rena Bennett reported them missing.

== Arrest ==
The two men stayed in a Uzhgorod hotel for nine days that "amounted to house arrest". They were then flown to Kiev. Kaminsky was put in solitary confinement cell number 35 in KGB headquarters. Bennett stayed in a hotel as a witness.

== Trial ==
After their arrest, Kaminsky and Bennett were given a lawyer who strongly advised them to plead guilty to all charges. The two men admitted they took pictures for a book Kaminsky was writing for the Northcraft Educational Fund.

Kaminsky was charged with espionage under Article II of the Soviet code on crimes against the state. Kaminsky said that "although I knew that I was being tried under article two of the Soviet Law and that carries the death sentence, I was repeatedly assured by the Russians that they would not execute me." The prosecutor even told Kaminsky, "Keep your head up Kaminsky, you're not going to die here". Kaminsky had long discussions with the prosecutor on who would win the United States presidential election.

On September 16, 1960, a military court in Western Ukraine sentenced Kaminsky to seven years in prison. According to TASS, during the trial, Bennett was called as a witness against Kaminsky and "denounced Kaminsky's activities and declared they were incompatible with tourism." Bennett later denied this claim.

Kaminsky appealed the sentence to the Presidium of the Supreme Soviet. Because he reported admission of guilt and expression of repentance, the Presidium ruled he should be expelled instead of being sent to jail. Kaminsky was released from jail on October 14.

== Question to Nikita Khrushchev ==
While in New York, Nikita Khrushchev was asked by NBC's Joe Michaels about the American tourists who were arrested for taking pictures. Khrushchev turned to Joe Michaels and said, "You are an evil man. I will not answer any more of your questions."

== Return to the United States ==
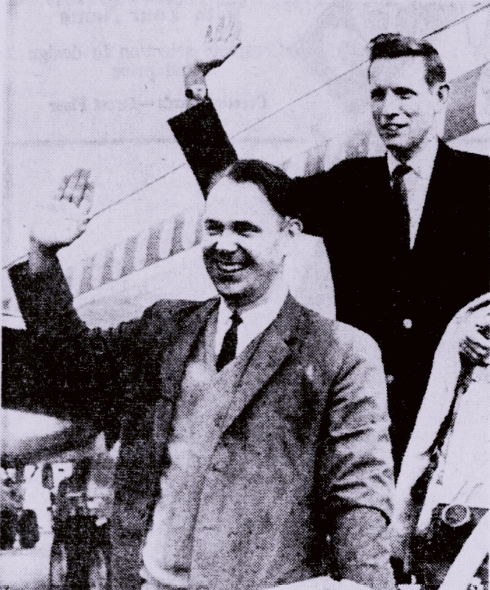
Kaminsky and Bennett arriving at the Idlewild Airport, the former name of the John F. Kennedy International Airport.

The men returned to the United States on October 20.

When Kaminsky returned to the United States, he stated that "he planned originally to tour Russia for five weeks to gather information for a book 'to show that the Soviet Union continually talks about peace but is preparing for war.'" He admitted he had planned to write a "slanderous" book about the Soviet Union. He had taken "pictures that would have shown the preparations for war on the Soviet borders facing west where the West has openly charged the Soviets keep 75 divisions at the ready...there are far more soldiers and military installations in the border zone, than there are civilians and farms and towns." In a contradictory account, Kaminsky said that the only military object he took a picture of was a solitary radar installation in the "haze of the Russian plains about a mile away".

A lawyer for the Northcraft Educational Foundation refused to name the "group's backers or give the location of its headquarters". TASS had called it a "spy organization".

In December, 1960, Kaminsky appeared on To Tell the Truth. The panelists attempted to identify Kaminsky but not one of the panelists identified him.

== Kaminsky's death ==
Kaminsky died on February 15, 2007. One of his obituaries states that he was an "undercover agent" for the United States government.

== See also ==
- Operation Lincoln
