= Thomas Boghardt =

American historian

Thomas Boghardt is a senior historian at the US Army Center of Military History. Prior to this post, he served as the historian at the International Spy Museum in Washington, D.C., and, formerly, as a Thyssen fellow at Georgetown University. He studied at Oxford University, St. Antony's College, where he received Ph.D. in European History in 1998.

== Principal publications ==
- Spies of the Kaiser, Palgrave MacMillan, 2004.
- Zimmerman Telegram: Intelligence, Diplomacy, and America's Entry into World War I, Naval Institute Press, 2012.
