= Vasili Mitrokhin =

Soviet archivist for the foreign intelligence service (1922–2004)

- Василий Митрохин
- Born: Vasiliy Nikitich Mitrokhin; 3 March 1922; Yurasovo, Ryazan Oblast, Russian SFSR, Soviet Union
- Died: 23 January 2004 (aged 81); London, England
- Employer: MI6

Vasiliy Nikitich Mitrokhin (Russian: Василий Никитич Митрохин, romanized: Vasily Nikitich Mitrokhin; March 3, 1922 – January 23, 2004), also known as Vasili Mitrokhin, was an archivist for the Soviet Union's foreign intelligence service, the First Chief Directorate of the KGB, who defected to the United Kingdom in 1992. Mitrokhin first offered his material to the U.S. Central Intelligence Agency (CIA) in Latvia, but they rejected it as possible fakes. He subsequently resorted to the UK's MI6 which arranged his defection from Russia. These notes became known as the Mitrokhin Archive.

Mitrokhin was co-author with Christopher Andrew of The Mitrokhin Archive: The KGB in Europe and the West, a massive account of Soviet intelligence operations based on copies of material from the archive. The second volume, The Mitrokhin Archive II: The KGB in the World, was published in 2005, soon after Mitrokhin's death.

== Early life and education ==
Mitrokhin was born in Yurasovo, in Central Russia, Ryazan Oblast, Russian SFSR. After leaving school, he entered artillery school, then attended university in Kazakh SSR, graduating with degrees in history and law.

== Career ==
=== Military ===
Towards the end of the World War II, Mitrokhin took a job in the prosecutor's office in Kharkiv in the Ukrainian SSR. He entered the MGB as a foreign intelligence officer in 1948. His first foreign posting was in 1952. During the 1950s, he served on various undercover assignments overseas. In 1956, for example, he accompanied the Soviet team to the Olympic Games in Australia. Later that year, after he had apparently mishandled an operational assignment, he was moved from operational duties to the archives of the KGB's First Chief Directorate and told he would never work in the field again.

=== Disillusionment ===
Mitrokhin has dated the beginnings of his disillusionment to Nikita Khrushchev's famous speech to the Communist Party of the Soviet Union congress denouncing Joseph Stalin, though it seems he may have been harbouring doubts for some time before that. For years, he had listened to broadcasts on the BBC and Voice of America, noting the gulf between their reports and party propaganda; however, when he began looking into the archives, he claimed to have been shocked by what he discovered about the KGB's systematic repression of the Soviet people. He recalled, "I could not believe such evil. It was all planned, prepared, thought out in advance. It was a terrible shock when I read things." Between 1972 and 1984, he supervised the move of the archive of the First Chief Directorate from the Lubyanka to the new KGB headquarters at Yasenevo. While doing so, he made handwritten copies and immensely detailed notes of documents from the archive. He retired in 1985.

=== Defection ===
During the Soviet era, Mitrokhin made no attempts to contact any Western intelligence services. After the dissolution of the Soviet Union in 1991, he traveled to Latvia with copies of material from the archive and walked into the American embassy in Riga. Central Intelligence Agency officers there did not consider him to be credible, concluding that the copied documents could have been faked. He then travelled to neighbouring Lithuania and went to the British embassy in Vilnius, where a young diplomat decided to meet with Mitrokhin. Following a further meeting one month later with representatives of the Secret Intelligence Service (MI6), operations retrieved the 25,000 pages of files hidden in his house, covering operations from as far back as the 1930s. He and his family were then exfiltrated to the United Kingdom, even though authorities of Yeltsin's Russia were not impeding the free travel abroad of active or retired members of secret services or members of their families. Richard Tomlinson, the MI6 officer imprisoned in 1997 for attempting to publish a book about his career, was one of those involved in retrieving the documents from containers hidden under the floor of the dacha. The notes given by Mitrokhin to the MI6 revealed exposures about some unknown number of Soviet agents, including Melita Norwood; however, Norwood was not charged with an offence.

== Publications ==
- Mitrokhin, Vasiliy Nikitich, The KGB in Afghanistan, English Edition, introduced and edited by Christian F. Ostermann and Odd Arne Westad, Woodrow Wilson International Center for Scholars, Cold War International History Project, Working Paper No. 40, Washington, D.C., February 2002.

=== Mitrokhin Archive ===
These handwritten notes of Mitrokhin are collectively referred to as the Mitrokhin Archive.

- Vasili Mitrokhin and Christopher Andrew, The Sword and the Shield: The Mitrokhin Archive and the Secret History of the KGB, Basic Books (1999), hardcover, ISBN 0-465-00310-9; trade paperback (September 2000), ISBN 0-465-00312-5
- Vasili Mitrokhin and Christopher Andrew, The World Was Going Our Way: The KGB and the Battle for the Third World, Basic Books (2005) hardcover, 677 pages ISBN 0-465-00311-7
- Andrew, Christopher; — (27 July 2000). The Mitrokhin Archive: The KGB in Europe and the West. Allen Lane History. Vol. 1. Penguin Books. ISBN 0-14-028487-7. OCLC 42606302. OL 7352280M – via Internet Archive.
- Vasiliy Mitrokhin, KGB Lexicon: The Soviet Intelligence Officer's Handbook, Frank Cass & Co. Ltd (2002), 451 pages, ISBN 0-7146-5257-1
- Vasiliy Mitrokhin, "Chekisms", Tales of the Cheka, A KGB Anthology. "Чекизмы" The Yurasov Press (2008), 435 pages, ISBN 978-0-10-850709-0. (The book could be obtained from any copyright library).

== See also ==
- Mitrokhin Archive
- List of Eastern Bloc defectors
- List of KGB defectors
