= Active Measures Working Group =

The Interagency Active Measures Working Group was a group led by the United States Department of State and later by the United States Information Agency (USIA). The group was formed early during the Reagan administration, in 1981, purportedly as an effort to counter Soviet disinformation.

Representatives of the CIA, FBI, Department of Defense, Arms Control and Disarmament Agency, Defense Intelligence Agency, Department of Justice, and the United States Information Agency were among the government agencies that served in the group. Deputy Assistant Secretary of State, Dennis Kux, was the group's first chairman and served until January, 1984. Three individuals succeeded Kux for brief stints: William Knepper, Tom Thorne, and Lucian Heichler. In 1985, Deputy Assistant Secretary of State Kathleen C. Bailey was appointed chair of the group and served until her departure in late 1987. An in-depth report by the National Defense University analyzed the history and effectiveness of the working group.

Although the primary focus of the group's activities was countering Soviet disinformation, it also reported on front groups and other Soviet active measures. The Active Measures Working Group developed an approach that expanded the U.S. Government's monitoring of Soviet disinformation from an activity conducted exclusively by the CIA into an interagency counter-disinformation effort.

== Background ==
In the early days of the Cold War, the CIA tracked Soviet disinformation and forgeries, but only periodically attempted to expose them. During the 1970s the U.S. chose not to fight back against Soviet active measures for two reasons. The first is that policy makers did not want to let what they saw as "unnecessary confrontation" to sidetrack progress on more important issues such as strategic arms control. The second reason was the disgrace of the CIA. During the Vietnam War, Johnson had ordered the CIA to monitor certain American citizens, notably the Black power and antiwar movements, which he feared were supported and infiltrated by foreign communists. Eventually this and similar monitoring programs were revealed to the public, prompting major public contention and major reforms of the CIA. The CIA was particularly damaged by the Senate (Church Committee) and House (Pike Committee) Intelligence Committees, and then did little to respond to anti-American disinformation.

In October 1979 Stanislav Levchenko, head of the Active Measures Line of the KGB Rezidentura in Tokyo, contacted American officials and was granted political asylum in the United States. Levchenko explained the workings of the Soviet apparatus and how it was carried out, under his direction, in Japan. Levchenko's information, combined with that of Ladislav Bittman, who had been the deputy head of the Czechoslovak Intelligence Service's Disinformation Department, was instrumental in helping the CIA understand many of the operations that were being carried out against the United States. This information was also reported to policymakers and Congress.

Under the Reagan Administration, the United States began openly challenging Soviet disinformation and active measures.

The formation of the Interagency Active Measures Working Group was encouraged by William Casey, Director of the CIA, had high-level State Department support from Lawrence Eagleburger, and the input of John Lenczowski of the National Security Council.

== Interagency cooperation ==
The Interagency Active Measures Working Group combined the information gathered at USIA international posts, CIA reporting, and FBI investigations. When this information arrived, it was analyzed by both working group analysts and CIA disinformation experts. The group made use of the CIA's computerized database of forgeries and, through the CIA, had unfettered access to KGB defectors involved in active measures.

The group instructed USIA overseas offices to report all disinformation that they encountered. The group also used the USIA and State Department to distribute its publications both domestically and abroad to journalists, government employees, U.S. embassy staff abroad, and foreign government representatives and staff.

The Active Measures Working Group was used as an outlet for expert knowledge within the government bureaucracy. For example, the group initially published a report by David Hertzberg {https://davidhertzberg.com}, a young INR analyst who had started his career with State just two years earlier while he was still an undergraduate at George Washington University. Hertzberg noticed a trend of increased illegal activity that was at odds with the image that the Soviet Union was trying to project: the Soviets were expanding their espionage activities, particularly attempts to steal military technology and defense industry proprietary information, and this corresponded with an increase in the number of Soviet agents expelled from countries for espionage. Hertzberg's report was sanitized, then published in February 1982 under the State Department's imprimatur as an "informal research study for background information" and was eventually converted into a Foreign Affairs Note entitled, "Expulsion of Soviet Representatives from Foreign Countries, 1970–81." (The complete collection of Foreign Affairs Notes can be viewed and downloaded here. The document generated news coverage and commentary on the expansion of Soviet spying and was directly cited by at least two major publications.

== Methodology 1981 Through Early 1985 ==
=== Report-Analyze-Publicize ===
The Active Measures Working Group developed a methodology named Report-Analyze-Publicize (or RAP). The group's first counter-disinformation effort against the Soviet Union took the form of a report, "State Department Special Report 88, Soviet Active Measures: Forgery, Disinformation, Political Operations" in October 1981. The document was a four-page overview of soviet active measures techniques and included Soviet disinformation themes and past examples. 14,000 copies of the report were distributed to news organizations, federal agencies, etc.

In addition to special reports, the group published a series of State Department Foreign Affairs Notes that USIA distributed to journalists, academics, and other interested persons abroad. One important publication distributed by the group was the House Intelligence Committee hearing on Soviet Active Measures which showed foreign audiences that there was congressional support for exposing Soviet disinformation. The group also held press conferences to expose Soviet forgeries and distributed copies of the fake documents to attending journalists.

=== "Truth Squads" ===
Members of the Active Measures Working Group gave presentations describing Soviet disinformation activities, pointing out the falsehoods or common themes and telltale signs of forgery. These presentations were often held internationally; the "squads" visited over 20 countries. The group averaged presentations in two countries per week and visited NATO headquarters annually for meetings on Soviet active measures.

These visits were also geared toward gathering information from foreign governments about Soviet active measures campaigns conducted in their respective countries. Dennis Kux commented on the success of these presentations: "The fact that we made a credible presentation, not an ideological show, lent a certain amount of professionalism to the whole effort."

=== Important cases ===
==== 1984 Summer Olympics ====
In an attempt to seek revenge for Carter's boycott of the Moscow Summer Olympics in 1980, the KGB manufactured a public relations crisis by forging letters from the Ku Klux Klan that threatened athletes from African countries and mailed them from Washington, DC, to these countries' Olympic committees.

Grammatical errors in the letters suggested they were originally drafted in Russian, but could not provide a certain conclusion. Then, a source of the FBI in the KGB that had participated in the production of the letters confirmed their origin was the KGB. The Active Measures Working Group then reported conclusively that the letters were Soviet forgeries, which allowed USIA and the State Department to reassure the targeted African countries. As a result, no African country withdrew their athletes from the 1984 Los Angeles Olympics.

== Methodology 1985 – 1987 ==
In 1985, Newt Gingrich, a congressional representative from the state of Georgia, sponsored an amendment promoting a permanent office in the Department of State on "Soviet and communist disinformation and press manipulation" to better inform the American public on these issues. Gingrich also added an amendment to unrelated legislation stipulating that the State Department must produce a public report on Soviet active measures. Responsibility for the report was assigned within the State Department to the Bureau of Intelligence and Research (INR), which was headed by Ambassador Morton Abramowitz. Abramowitz charged Kathleen C. Bailey with responsibility for the report and named her Chair of the Working Group.

Although Bailey supported the continuation of Foreign Affairs Notes as a group product, one of her first decisions was to change the group's focus from single-author, short publications to multi-agency drafted compendiums of more in-depth analyses, of which the "Gingrich Report" was the first. This report, "A Report on the Substance and Process of the anti-US Disinformation and Propaganda Campaigns," was published in August 1986. The second major report, entitled "A Report on Active Measures and Propaganda, 1986–1987" was published in August 1987. This report, as well as a Foreign Affairs Note published the month before, focused on the Soviet disinformation campaign seeking to attribute the AIDS virus to the U.S. Government.

In October 1987, Mikhail Gorbachev waved a copy of this report at U.S. Secretary of State George Shultz, complaining that publishing such information undermined relations between their countries. Gorbachev insisted that the report contained "shocking revelations" and that it amounted to "nourishing hatred" for the Soviet Union.

=== Operation Infektion ===
The Active Measures Working Group's policy of exposing Soviet disinformation helped to discredit the Soviet disinformation campaign, Operation Infektion, which accused the United States of deliberately creating the AIDS virus in a government laboratory and spreading it. The State Department held a press conference (a video of which is here) to release the Report, which had a copy on its cover of the Pravda cartoon that accused the U.S. of creating the virus. The impact of this 1987 Report has continued to reverberate and was recently a key component of a New York Times documentary on Operation Infektion.

== Other cases of Soviet disinformation during the 1980s ==
- The Soviets forged a memorandum from the President of the United States to the Secretaries of State and Defense and the director of the CIA, that ordered the establishment of a U.S. military force called the "Permanent Peace Forces" that would be used to intervene in Latin America. This forgery inflamed nationalist and anti-American sentiment in Latin America.
- The Soviets circulated false allegations that the United States was importing Latin American children only to use their body parts for organ transplants.
- In 1982, the Soviets forged a transcript of a speech made by United Nations Ambassador Jeane Kirkpatrick that called for the balkanization of India and planted it in the Indian press.
- The Soviets forged an NSC Policy Paper which outlines global U.S. political and military foreign policy between 1985 and 1988. A central theme in the paper was the purported U.S. goal of "strategic dominion" over the Soviet Union. The forgery included underlying goals such as the integration of Swiss, Austrian, and Swedish national resources into NATO and the "neutralization" of discussions concerning nuclear-free zones.
- The Soviets forged a letter from the USIA to Senator Durenberger in 1986 which outlines a purported USIA plan to disseminate rumors about events in the Soviet Union in the wake of the accident at the Chernobyl nuclear power plant, such as exaggerated reports of the number of victims.
- Religious organizations that were used as front organizations: the Anti-Zionist Committee, the Christian Peace Conference, the World Council of Churches, the Asian Buddhist Council for Peace.
- The World Peace Council was the largest Soviet front organization set up after World War II.

== Working Group products and publications ==
The Interagency Active Measures Working Group had two primary categories of written products. The first comprised short special reports and Foreign Affairs Notes, which ranged from 1 page to a maximum of 12 pages in length. INR analyst David Hertzberg authored all of the Foreign Affairs Notes; when he moved on in his career and left the Soviet account, no further Foreign Affairs Notes were published by the State Department. The complete collection of Foreign Affairs Notes can be viewed and downloaded online. This category also included some speeches and articles drafted for presentation by U.S. officials.

The second category of reports was lengthy (many tens of pages), in-depth, interagency-drafted documents.

=== Special Reports and Foreign Affairs Notes ===
==== 1981 ====
- Soviet Active Measures: Forgery, Disinformation, Political Operations. Special Report 88. October 1981.

==== 1982 ====
- Expulsion of Soviet Representatives from Foreign Countries, 1970–81. Foreign Affairs Note. February 1982.
- World Peace Council: Instrument of Soviet Foreign Policy. Foreign Affairs Note. April 1982.
- Religion in the U.S.S.R.: Laws, Policy, and Propaganda. Foreign Affairs Note. May 1982.
- Soviet Active Measures: An Update. Special Report 101. July 1982.
- Moscow's Radio Peace and Progress. Foreign Affairs Note. August 1982.
- Communist Clandestine Broadcasting. Foreign Affairs Note. December 1982.

==== 1983 ====
- Lawrence Eagleburger. "Unacceptable Intervention: Soviet Active Measures." NATO Review 31, no. 1 (April 1983), 6–11.
- Expulsions of Soviet Officials Worldwide, 1982. Foreign Affairs Note. January 1983.
- Soviet Active Measures: Focus on Forgeries. Foreign Affairs Note. April 1983.
- The World Peace Council's "Peace Assemblies." Foreign Affairs Note. May 1983.
- Lawrence Eagleburger. "Unacceptable Intervention: Soviet Active Measures." Department of State Bulletin #2077, August 1983, 45–49. Reprinted from NATO Review 31, no. 1 (1983).
- World Federation of Trade Unions: Soviet Foreign Policy Tool. Foreign Affairs Note. August 1983.
- Soviet Active Measures. Special Report 110. September 1983.

==== 1984 ====
- Expulsions of Soviets Worldwide, 1983. Foreign Affairs Note. January 1984.
- "Soviet Active Measures." An Address by William E. Knepper, Deputy Assistant Secretary, Bureau for Intelligence and Research, before the Chicago Council on Foreign Relations, Current Policy, no. 595 (May 30, 1984).
- Soviet Fronts: Women and Youth. Foreign Affairs Note. July 1984.

==== 1985 ====
- Expulsions of Soviets Worldwide, 1984. Foreign Affairs Note. January 1985.
- Soviet Active Measures: The World Peace Council. Foreign Affairs Note. April 1985.
- Soviet Active Measures: Christian Peace Conference. Foreign Affairs Note. May 1985.
- Soviet Active Measures: The 12th World Youth Festival in Moscow. Foreign Affairs Note. June 1985.
- Contemporary Soviet Propaganda and Disinformation: A Conference Report. June 1985.
- "Soviet Use of Active Measures." An address by William J. Casey, Director of the Central Intelligence Agency, to the Dallas Council on World Affairs. Current Policy, no. 761 (September 18, 1985).
- Update: The 12th World Youth Festival in Moscow. Foreign Affairs Note. December 1985.

==== 1986 ====
- Expulsions of Soviets Worldwide, 1985. Foreign Affairs Note. January 1986.
- Recent Anti-American Forgeries. Foreign Affairs Note. November 1986.

==== 1987 ====
- Expulsion of Soviet Officials, 1986. Foreign Affairs Note. January 1987.
- Moscow and the Peace Movement: The Soviet Committee for the Defense of Peace. Foreign Affairs Note. May 1987.
- Recent Anti-American Forgeries: An Update. Foreign Affairs Note. July 1987.
- The U.S.S.R.'s AIDS Disinformation Campaign. Foreign Affairs Note. July 1987.

==== 1988 ====
- Expulsions of Soviet Officials, 1987. Foreign Affairs Note. January 1988.

=== Major interagency publications ===
U.S. Department of State, Active Measures: A Report on the Substance and Process of Anti-U.S. Disinformation and Propaganda Campaigns . August 1986.

U.S. Department of State, Soviet Influence Activities: A Report on Active Measures and Propaganda, 1986–1987 August 1987.

U.S. Department of State, "Disinformation, The Media, and Foreign Policy." Conference Report. May 1987.

U.S. Information Agency, Soviet Active Measures in the Era of Glasnost . March 1988

U.S. Department of State, Soviet Influence Activities: A Report on Active Measures and Propaganda, 1987–1988 August, 1989.

== Abolition ==
Support for the group began to deteriorate in the late 1980s because Soviet disinformation seemed less of a threat in light of Gorbachev's Glasnost and the Soviets' promise to cease all disinformation operations. The group's mission to counter Soviet disinformation lost its pertinence upon the disintegration of the Soviet Union, and along with it, bureaucratic interest in the group's efforts.

The quality of the group's membership declined as both the CIA's and FBI's longest serving group members distanced themselves and began sending younger, less experienced participants in their place. Furthermore, many of the Reagan appointees who supported the working group had left the NSC in the aftermath of the Iran-Contra scandal.

The counter-disinformation effort shifted to USIA's Office to Counter Soviet Disinformation headed by Charles Wick and included Herbert Romerstein and Todd Leventhal.

The Active Measures Working Group's final report, "Soviet Active Measures in the 'Post-Cold War' Era 1988–1991," came out in June 1992 and was written by Todd Leventhal under the auspices of USIA. By the time of publication, the Soviet Union no longer existed, the report warned that even though the Soviet Union had collapsed, active measures were still a threat to U.S. interests because a number of anti-American groups and countries were adopting and expanding the use of active measures: "As long as states and groups interested in manipulating world opinion, limiting U.S. Government actions, or generating opposition to U.S. policies and interests continue to use these techniques, there will be a need for the United States Information Agency to systematically monitor, analyze, and counter them."

== Lessons learned ==
1. "In responding to disinformation, the United States has the tremendous advantage that the truth is inherently more powerful than lies. But if the lies go unchallenged, then they can have a damaging effect." —Charles Wick, 1988
2. Simply exposing acts of disinformation was an extremely powerful tool in undermining their efficacy.
3. Effective strategic communication necessitates interagency collaboration because of its ability to pull together diverse expertise from multiple organizations.

== Legacy ==
In June 2020, Michael McCaul announced that he would introduce legislation to recreate a modern version of the Active Measure Working Group to combat Chinese Communist Party propaganda and disinformation.

== See also ==
- Active measures
- Fake news website
- Information warfare
- Propaganda
- Propaganda techniques
- Psychological Operations (United States)
- Psychological warfare
- Unconventional warfare
- War of ideas
- Disinformation
- Black propaganda
- Counter Misinformation Team
- Operation INFEKTION
- United States Information Agency
