= George Lenczowski =

Russian lawyer and diplomat (1915–2000)

George Lenczowski (pol. Jerzy Lenczowski; February 2, 1915 – February 19, 2000) was a lawyer, diplomat, scholar, and Professor of Political Science, Emeritus, at the University of California, Berkeley. Lenczowski was a pioneer in his field as the founder and first chair of the Committee (later Center) of Middle Eastern Studies at Berkeley. He was among America's first major scholars of the modern Middle East.

Lenczowski's book, American Presidents and the Middle East, along with The Other Arab-Israeli Conflict by Steven L. Spiegel and Peace Process by William B. Quandt, are considered by historian and former Israeli ambassador to the United States, Michael Oren, as being "three of the genre's finer examples", focusing on the post-World War II period and seeking to investigate broader aspects of America's Middle East history.

Lenczowski was the father of John Lenczowski, president and founder of the Institute of World Politics.

== Early life ==
George Lenczowski was born as Jerzy Lenczowski of Polish parentage, in St. Petersburg, Russia (then known as Petrograd), on February 2, 1915, at a time when the land of his ancestors was still part of neighboring empires. His father worked as an engineer until the Russian Revolution. One of Lenczowski's earliest memories was a perilous escape from the Bolsheviks through war-torn Russia, which brought the Lenczowski family back to what soon would become an independent Poland, following World War I. It was there that Lenczowski received his education from primary school to the faculty of law from the University of Warsaw. He took his LL.M degree in 1936 and continued his studies in France, where he earned a Certificate in Civil Law at the University of Paris (1936) and a Doctorate in Juridical Science in Lille (1937). His dissertation on Contracts in Private and International Law was written in French and published in Paris by Domat-Montchrestien in 1938.

== A young man ==
Following graduation, Lenczowski entered the Polish Foreign Service as a junior diplomat, and was stationed in the British Mandate of Palestine, acting as consular officer and liaison between the British authorities and Jewish immigrants from Poland. He was witness to the growing numbers of Jews desperate to escape Eastern Europe. "He was involved in what was a very difficult and delicate process," said Lenczowski's son, "The British were trying to control the immigration and the Arabs didn't want the immigration."

When Poland was invaded and occupied by Germany and later by the Soviet Union in 1939, Lenczowski's Palestine assignment came to an end. In 1940 he volunteered to serve in the Polish Independent Carpathian Brigade which had moved out from Vichy controlled French Syria to Palestine. He saw action in Egypt and Libya, but most prominently at the siege of Tobruk, and advanced to the rank of second lieutenant. At the end of 1941, however, he was recalled by the Polish Foreign Service to be stationed, as press attaché, at the Polish Embassy in Tehran, Iran. There he was part of the effort to receive, process and assist some two million Poles, who had just been released from Soviet concentration camps upon the intervention of Britain.

It was there that he met his future wife, Bronia, who herself had been a prisoner of the Soviets; they were wed in March 1943. He was also in Tehran during the 1943 Tehran Conference involving Franklin D. Roosevelt, Winston Churchill and Joseph Stalin. Tragedy struck at this time also, when his parents were arrested by the Germans during the Warsaw Uprising and executed in a concentration camp.

== To America ==
When the Yalta accord was signed in 1945, the Lenczowskis refused to serve in Stalin's communist government in Poland and sought refuge in the United States. After a year of graduate study at Johns Hopkins University, and occasional work for the Foreign Broadcasting Division of the Department of State, Lenczowski found employment as instructor, and later assistant professor, at Hamilton College in New York State. It was here that he came to the attention of Peter Odegard, one of the pivotal figures of the discipline of political science of the time and chair of the Berkeley department. He became a U.S. citizen in 1951.

== At Berkeley ==
Upon Odegard's invitation, Lenczowski came to Berkeley in 1952 as a visiting associate professor; after another year of research and language study in Lebanon, he became a tenured member of the faculty. Lenczowski made his scholarly debut in the United States by publishing Russia and the West in Iran (1949). He soon followed this with his path-breaking work, The Middle East in World Affairs (1952). This book was republished, with appropriate revisions, in three later editions and has remained an authoritative text on the politics of the region for over three decades. The fourth edition was reviewed by John C. Campbell in Foreign Affairs in 1980 and states, in part; "This new edition of a well-known survey is worth noting for the extensive additional material covering 18 years of kaleidoscopic events, and because it remains remarkably comprehensive and reliable both as an introduction to the region and as a reference work."

In Berkeley, Lenczowski was the founder and first chair of the Committee (later Center) of Middle Eastern Studies. Over the years, he served as vice chair and was among the nation's first major scholars of the modern Middle East. As an undergraduate teacher he was respected for his precision and openness; as graduate advisor of his department and mentor of graduate students he raised a generation of scholars who, in tribute, published the volume, Ideology and Power in the Middle East: Essays in Honor of George Lenczowski (1988). David P. Gardner, then University of California president, spoke in the book's foreword of Lenczowski's "contributions to a better understanding of the Middle East, and particularly a better understanding of its international relations, its revolutions, and the crucial role of oil." Between 1949 and his death, Lenczowski authored six books and monographs, co-authored and co-edited two others, and published nearly 100 scholarly articles on Middle Eastern politics. Lenczowski retired from Berkeley in 1985. His last book, American Presidents and the Middle East, was released in 1990.

== Beyond Berkeley ==
George Lenczowski's scholarship is characterized by the accumulation of massive amounts of data, most of which he collected from personal encounters and field trips. He was aided by his fluency in Polish, English, French, German, Russian, Arabic, and Persian. He was a master interviewer and was able to develop unusual rapport with his subjects. "He knew mid-Eastern heads of state, he knew everyone," said Laurence Michalak, vice chairman of the Center for Middle Eastern Studies at Berkeley, "He was friendly with the royalty of Iran, Jordan and Saudi Arabia. He was a big, tall man with a Polish accent. He had a very courtly manner. He was very, very polished and very well liked." His reputation for objectivity made him welcome everywhere and earned him the respect of U.S. administrations of both political parties. He was a frequent visitor to the White House under both Democratic and Republican administrations.

Lenczowski was invited to serve on the governing boards of numerous learned societies and centers of research. He spoke or lectured at St Antony's College, Oxford, the Hebrew University of Jerusalem, the universities of Geneva, Tehran, and Toronto, the American University of Beirut, the Royal Institute of International Affairs (Chatham House), the National War College (Washington, D.C.), the Army War College (Pennsylvania), and Stanford University's Hoover Institution. Lenczowski's humanism inspired in him a love of the law, a belief in social justice, and hope for world peace.

== List of books ==
George Lenczowski, Russia and the West in Iran (1949)

George Lenczowski, The Middle East in World Affairs (1952)

George Lenczowski, Oil And State In The Middle East (1960)

George Lenczowski, Ed., The Political Awakening In The Middle East (1970)

George Lenczowski, Political Elites in the Middle East (United States Interests in the Middle East) (Jul 1975)

George Lenczowski, Iran Under the Pahlavis (Hoover Institution publication) (Dec 1978)

George Lenczowski. American Presidents and the Middle East. Duke University Press, 1990. ISBN 0-8223-0972-6.
