= Public diplomacy of Iran =

Public diplomacy in the Islamic Republic of Iran refers to the public relations efforts to disseminate information about the Islamic Republic of Iran. Such efforts seek to communicate with foreign publics in order to establish a dialogue designed to inform and influence. Instruments of public diplomacy in the Islamic Republic of Iran include cultural exchanges, film and print media, and sports diplomacy.

== Definition ==
There is no standard definition of public diplomacy.

Public Diplomacy is that "form of international Political Advocacy in which the civilians of one country use legitimate means to reach out to the civilians of another country in order to gain popular support for negotiations occurring through diplomatic channels."

The United States Information Agency, the predecessor to the U.S. State Department's Undersecretary of State for Public Diplomacy and Public Affairs, defines as public diplomacy as efforts that seek "to promote the national interest of … through understanding, informing and influencing foreign audiences."

The U.S. State Department's "Dictionary of International Relations Terms" defines public diplomacy as anything that "refers to government-sponsored programs intended to inform or influence public opinion in other countries; its chief instruments are publications, motion pictures, cultural exchanges, radio and television."

Michael McClellan, one time Public Diplomacy Counselor for the U.S. Embassy Dublin, notes that "public diplomacy [is] the strategic planning and execution of informational, cultural and educational programming by an advocate country to create a public opinion environment in a target country or countries that will enable target country political leaders to make decisions that are supportive of advocate country's foreign policy objectives."

The distinguishing factor between diplomacy and public diplomacy is the target audience. Where traditional diplomacy focuses on governments communicating with one another, public diplomacy seeks to engage foreign citizens and publics in order to change opinions and perceptions. Public diplomacy may present a point of view that differs than that of the targeted population's home government. In such cases, critics argue that public diplomacy is a new word for influence operations and/or propaganda.

== Cultural diplomacy ==
The U.S. Department of State defines cultural diplomacy as the "linchpin of public diplomacy; for it is in cultural activities that a nation's idea of itself is best represented." Further, cultural diplomacy seeks to demonstrate national values which might be shared with foreign audiences.

The Islamic Republic of Iran relies on its cultural heritage and exchanges as a basis for its public diplomacy campaign. According to B.Bahriev and H.Jabbari Nasir, culture forms a considerable part of Iran's soft power and Tehran actively utilizes public diplomacy instruments not only for its enhancement but also makes use of it in fighting modern terrorists' narratives.

=== Islamic Culture and Relations Organization ===
The Islamic Culture and Relations Organization, subordinate to the Ministry of Culture and Islamic Guidance, is the Islamic Republic of Iran's primary organization for implementing and leading cultural outreach outside of Iran. The purpose of the ICRO is to promote "cultural ties with other nations and communities; consolidation of cultural ties of the Islamic republic of Iran with other nations; [offer] proper presentation of the Iranian culture and civilization; preparing the grounds for unity among Muslims; revival and promotion of Islamic culture and teachings in the world; and information dissemination about the principles and realities of the Islamic Revolution." The Islamic Culture and Relations Organization is Iran's de facto public diplomacy organization.

Selected Islamic Culture and Relations Organization activities include:

The Iran Friendship Association seeks to target prominent members of the Albanian business, political, and scientific communities. Created by Alibeman Eghbali Zarch, former Iranian Ambassador to Albania, the Iran Friendship Association has strong ties to the Albania Institute of Islamic Thought and Culture.

The Saadi Shirazi Cultural Foundation is directly financed through the Islamic Culture and Relations Organizations. The foundation provides support for Iranian-related activities and organizations in Albania. Such support has included providing Iranian personalities for speaking tours in Tirana, including former Members of Iranian Parliament. The Saadi Shirazi Cultural Foundation targets middle and upper class Albanians.

The Islamic Culture and Relations Organization hosts art exhibitions displaying Iranian and Persian culture and history. In 2011, the Iranian Embassy in Jakarta provided an exhibition showcasing Persian calligrapher Mojtaba Sabzeh. The exhibition displayed Persian calligraphy samples while also offering discussion, seminars, and workshops related to Iranian art. The Islamic Republic of Iran Broadcasting's Press TV provided the reporting of the 2011 Jakarta event.

The Islamic Culture and Relations Organization and Iranian Embassy in Algiers hosted the Capital of Islamic Culture 2011 program in Tlemcen, Algeria. The event mixed Algerian and Iranian cartoons, handicrafts, paintings, and sculpture. The program further linked Algeria and Iran's shared Islamic history.

=== Music diplomacy ===
Music diplomacy is one aspect of cultural diplomacy that seeks to engage foreign publics through musical performances. The Tehran Symphony Orchestra is often sponsored by the Iranian government in musical exchanges throughout the world. In its efforts to approach European audiences, Iran's Ministry of Foreign Affairs provided free tickets to invited dignitaries and guests. Describing the 2010 European tour, The New York Times referenced overt propaganda through performances of the "Peace and Friendship Symphony", a piece written to commemorate the thirtieth anniversary of the Islamic Revolution. Much of the tour was met with criticism by demonstrations and protests. Michael Kimmelman of The New York Times declared the performance a tragedy, failing to meet the efforts of proper cultural exchange and public diplomacy.

=== Sports diplomacy ===
Sports diplomacy refers to the use of sport and sport activity as a means to influence diplomatic, social, and political relations of a foreign public. Sporting exchanges provide a platform for increased dialogue among the people of foreign states, and to promote cultural understanding.

Having placed in the 49th World Team Table Tennis Championship in the People's Republic of China, Iran's Table Tennis team accepted an offer to hold joint training with the United States. The Iranian team trained in Las Vegas, beating the U.S. team 3–1. The Iranian team went on to play in the Las Vegas Open Table Tennis Tournament that year.

Wrestling is the national sport of the Islamic Republic of Iran, and the Iranian athletics associations often invites foreign teams to compete in the Takhti Cup. Iran admitted the United States to the 1998 Takhti Cup in a cultural exchange. The 1998 Takhti Cup welcomed the first American sports team to Iran since the Islamic Revolution. Iran views the opportunity to show its rich heritage and history in the sport of wrestling.

== Islamic Republic of Iran Broadcasting ==
The Islamic Republic of Iran Broadcasting is the state-run broadcast communications organization. The IRIB contributes to the Islamic Republic's cultural diplomacy by providing Iranian focused radio, satellite-television, and web based broadcasts presented in a number of languages.

=== Al Alam ===
Al Alam is the IRIB's 24-hour Arabic satellite channel, targeting over 300 million Arabic speakers worldwide. Launched in early 2003, the network initially served as a platform of opposition to both the Iraq led Ba'ath Party and the 2003 U.S. invasion of Iraq. The BBC early reported that Al Alam shared programming similarities to Qatar-based Al Jazeera, only with an Iranian message. Such reporting has allowed Al Alam to promote a pan-Muslim image in order to downplay the Shia-Sunni sectarian conflict during the height of Operation Iraqi Freedom.

=== Hispan TV ===
HispanTV is the IRIB's newest satellite network venture, targeting Spanish speaking populations of the Americas. First offering its news and analysis via the internet, HispanTV is scheduled to expand its satellite broadcasts in early 2012. Hispan TV is intending to counter what Ali Mohaqqeq, General-Secretary of the Iranian Embassy in Brazil, says is a western "monopoly of news about Iran and the Middle East in Latin America."

=== iFilm ===
Like Al Alam, iFilm is an Arabic speaking satellite network that targets much of Southwest Asia. The iFilm network presents Iranian films and serials to the Arab world in an attempt to present a near-real likeness of Iranian culture and society. Programs include: art and culture, documentaries, movies, short films and television series. Such television shows seek to build mutual friendship and understanding between Iranian and foreign (Arabic-speaking) publics. Broadcasts are aired in three 8-hour blocks, allowing all Middle Eastern communities the opportunity to view their favorite films and serials. As a network financed by the Islamic Republic of Iran Broadcasting, iFilm depicts television entertainment in accordance to the mandates of the Ministry of Culture and Islamic Guidance.

=== Al Kawthar TV ===
Al Kawthar TV is IRIB's Arabic-speaking religious network. Promoting Shi'a Islam, Al Kawthar provides religious programming targeting the Middle East and North Africa. Programming includes Islamic cultural, intellectual, and social documentaries. The network seeks to promote unity among Muslims, strengthening Iran's position within the Islamic community. Al Kawthar TV provides roughly nineteen hours of broadcasts per day.

=== Press TV ===
Press TV is a 24-hour English language satellite network targeting Europe and North America. Press TV has been accused of being a mouthpiece of propaganda for the Iranian regime.

== See also ==
- Information Warfare
- Music and political warfare
- Propaganda
- Psychological Warfare
- War of Ideas
- White propaganda
