= Blanka Rosenstiel =

Polish American philanthropist

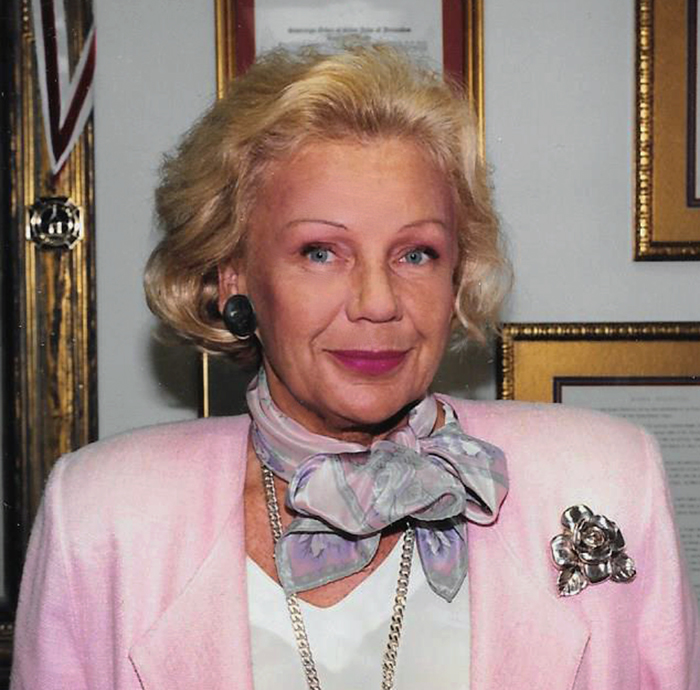
- Portrait of Blanka Rosenstiel
- Born: Blanka Aldona Wdowiak; 1931; Warsaw, Poland
- Organization(s): American Institute of Polish Culture (AIPC); Chopin Foundation of the United States
- Spouse: Lewis S. Rosenstiel

Blanka Aldona Rosenstiel (née Wdowiak; born 1931) is a Polish American philanthropist. She currently serves as the president, chairwoman, and chief executive of The American Institute of Polish Culture (AIPC) and president of the Chopin Foundation of the United States.

== Early life ==
Blanka Aldona Rosenstiel (née Wdowiak) was born in Warsaw, Poland in 1931 to Wacław Wdowiak, a postal worker, and Irena Wdowiak (née Karaszewka). She was born into a Catholic family. In 1944 during the Warsaw Uprising, her father was taken to Auschwitz concentration camp, and Rosenstiel, her mother, and one of her two brothers became slave laborers at the Frankfurt railroad station, laying bricks. Other members of her family were also taken to other labor and concentration camps. Rosenstiel, her mother, and her brother were liberated from Niederhausen concentration camp in 1945 by the Allied Powers. However, her father died in Magdeburg labor camp in Germany.

Rosenstiel has stated about the experience, “Those were difficult years, but somehow and against all odds, a few of us survived. Although my mother deplored the years we lost without schooling, she instilled in us optimism and positive thinking. She convinced us that the future would be better, brighter and successful".

Rosenstiel and her family did not return to Poland following their liberation, as Poland was now under Soviet control. Her family lived in Trier for a time, before moving to Luxembourg, where she did radio work. The family then moved to Brussels, Belgium, where Rosenstiel was a cabaret singer and studied art. In 1956, she moved to the United States.

== Career and philanthropy ==
In 1972, Rosenstiel founded The American Institute of Polish Culture (AIPC). She was inspired by her interest in the arts, dedication to helping young artists succeed, and her desire to promote both Polish history and heritage and Polish-American culture. She currently serves as the President, chairman, and Chief Executive. In 1975, in collaboration with the University of Miami's School of Music, she presented the First National Chopin Piano Competition of the United States in Miami. The success of this competition inspired Rosenstiel to establish the Chopin Foundation of the United States in 1977. She currently serves the president of the foundation.

Following the death of her husband, Lewis S. Rosenstiel, in 1976, she gained control of the Rosenstiel Foundation, which funds her charitable work. She has donated millions to Brandeis University, Mount Sinai Medical Center, the Crippled Children's Society (now known as AbilityFirst), the National Symphony Orchestra, and the Washington National Opera.

Alongside AIPC, Rosenstiel helped establish the permanent Kosciuszko Chair of Polish Studies at the University of Virginia in 1998. The ownership of this chair was given back to AIPC after a period of inactivity, and then given to the Institute of World Politics to carry out the mission. Each year the Institute awards scholarships in the field of journalism, communication, or public relations to talented students of Polish origin.

She currently serves as Honorary Consul for the Polish government in Miami, Florida, an honor which was awarded in 1998. She was the first Polish Consul in the history of Florida.

In 2013, Rosenstiel stated her plan to invest up to PLN200m in Polish companies by 2014. By September 2013, her investment vehicle Polish American Investment Fund (PAIF) had already spent over PLN7m on stakes in six firms in the Warsaw Stock Exchange's main market and the NewConnect platform, including the IdeaTFI fund. In December 2013, she was appointed to the supervisory board of Dom Maklerski IDMSA, a consulting firm. By February 2014, the PAIF also invested in Global Energy, Mostostal Export, and United, and about 10% of the promised PLN200m was spent.

== Personal life ==
In 1963, she met her future husband Lewis S. Rosenstiel, the founder and chair of Schenley Industries and philanthropist, when she was 32 and he was 72. She states that they were both in love with one another. "He was a brilliant and fascinating man—not what some people are saying now," she says. "He was a businessman and very generous. He gave away $100 million to charities in his lifetime." They were married from 1967 until his death on January 21, 1976.

She currently resides in Miami Beach, Florida during the winter and in Charlottesville, Virginia during the summer. In Charlottesville, she lives on a 1790 Colonial mansion on her 1,400-acre Blandemar Farm and raises horses. She was awarded Doctor honoris causa (Dr.h.c.) from the International Fine Arts College in Miami in 1976 and Dr. humane letters from Alliance College in Cambridge Spring, Pennsylvania in 1978. She can speak Polish, English, French, German, and Spanish, and her hobbies include sculpting, painting, and swimming.

== Awards and recognitions ==
- Community Television Foundation of South Florida, Inc. – PB Award, 1975, 1976
- Outstanding Citizen's Award of Dade County, FL, 1975
- Polish American Congress, Florida Division – Certificate of Appreciation, 1975
- Biscayne College Award, 1976
- International Fine Arts College of Miami – Doctor Honoris Causa, 1976
- Alliance College of Cambridge Springs, PA – Doctor of Humane Letters, 1978
- American Council of Polish Cultural Clubs National Award, 1978
- National Advocates Society and National Medical and Dental Association – National Humanitarian Award, 1981
- St. Mary's College in Orchard Lake, MI – Ambassadors Award, 1981
- Miami Ballet Society Humanitarian Award, 1983
- National Parkinson Foundation Humanitarian Award, 1983
- American Council of Polish Cultural Clubs Award, 1984
- Knights of Malta- Lady of the Sovereign Order of St. John of Jerusalem, 1984
- Am-Pol Eagle – National Citizen of the Year Award, 1985
- Florida International University – The Society of Founders Award, 1989
- Greater Miami Youth Symphony Award, 1994
- Orchard Lake Schools – Honorary Benefactor and Alumna, 1994
- Admirals of the Fleet of Florida – Woman of Distinction Award, 1995
- Ellis Island Medal of Honor, 1995
- Cavalier's Cross of Polonia Restituta Order, 1996
- Jose Marti Medal, 1998
- Polish Commander Cross of the Order of Merit, 2004
- National Polish Apostolate Committee- Pride of Polonia Award, 2007
- Cardinal Stanislaw Dziwisz of Kraków- Pope John Paul II Medal, 2012
