= 495 Communications =

- Company type: Private
- Industry: Online Video; Magazines; Programmatic Commerce; Advertising
- Headquarters: New York City, New York; Santa Monica, California
- Owner: Craig Pavia (CRO / Executive Producer); Bret Polansky (CEO)

495 Communications is an advertising and content marketing company based in New York City and Santa Monica. The New York-based editorial team produces original travel-related editorial and video content under the company's Travel Savvy brand, which was formerly a newsstand magazine title owned by Sidney Frank. The company's West Coast division manages programmatic digital and video advertising. 495 Communications also owns and operates an HTML video player named SavvyGo and a Quality Exchange platform, 495 Qex.

== Travel Savvy ==
Founded as a print magazine by Adam Rodriguez and Jake Porter in September 2003, Travel Savvy magazine had a circulation of 135,000 when Grey Goose founder Sidney Frank bought the title for $5 million in 2005. When Frank died on January 10, 2006, the magazines folded a month later due to cash flow problems from Frank's charitable foundation. Craig Pavia, who was the group publisher of Travel Savvy under Frank, bought the assets from the Frank family in February 2006 and continued as a digital-only publication, founding 495 Communications to manage the native content in the process. In the summer of 2015, TravelSavvy.TV was created as a digital video network and editorial website, featuring editorial travel content, online magazines, and video series that stream online and via Roku and AppleTV devices.
