= Lewis Rosenstiel =

American businessman and philanthropist (1891–1976)

- Born: Lewis Solon Rosenstiel; July 21, 1891; Cincinnati, Ohio, U.S.
- Died: January 21, 1976 (aged 84); Miami Beach, Florida, U.S.
- Occupation: Businessman
- Known for: Founder of Schenley Industries
- Spouse(s): Dorothy Heller; Leonore Cohn; Louise Rosenstiel; Susan Kaufman; Blanka Wdowiak
- Children: Louise Rosensteil and David Rosensteil
- Relatives: Sidney Frank (son-in-law)

Lewis Solon Rosenstiel (21 July 1891 – 21 January 1976) was an American liquor distributor and philanthropist-fundraiser for Jewish causes. He was the founder of Schenley Industries, an American liquor company.

The Rosenstiel Award, issued by Brandeis University and the Rosenstiel School of Marine, Atmospheric, and Earth Science at the University of Miami, is named after him and his wife.

His grant also established the Rosenstiel Basic Medical Sciences Research Center at Brandeis University.

== Early life and education ==
Rosenstiel was born to a Jewish family in Cincinnati, Ohio, the son of Elizabeth (née Johnson) and Solon Rosenstiel. He attended University School and Franklin Prep.

== Career ==
He began his career working at his uncle's business, Susquemac Distilling Company, in Milton, Kentucky. Rosenstiel organized Schenley Products Company in the 1920s. The company bought numerous distillers, including one in Schenley, Pennsylvania, that had licenses to produce medicinal whisky. In 1933, when Prohibition ended, Schenley Distillers Company was formed as a publicly owned company. In 1949, the company's name was changed to Schenley Industries.

Schenley became one of the largest liquor companies in the United States. It was one of the "Big Four", which dominated liquor sales, and included Seagram, National Distillers, and Hiram Walker. Rosenstiel retired from Schenley in 1968 and it was acquired by Israeli financier Meshulam Riklis. The company was sold to Guinness in 1987.

In February 1971, a Congressional investigator testified that Rosenstiel participated in a bootlegging "consortium".

== Personal life ==
Rosenstiel was married five times: to Dorothy Heller, Leonore Cohn (niece of Harry Cohn, founder of Columbia Pictures), Louise Rosenstiel, Susan Kaufman, and Blanka Wdowiak. His daughter Louise married Sidney Frank, who well after her death in 1973, became a billionaire creating the vodka Grey Goose and through guerilla marketing of the German cordial Jägermeister. His second wife, Lee, later married Walter Annenberg, was on the board of the Metropolitan Opera, and led the influential Annenberg Foundation. His divorce from his fourth wife changed the divorce laws in the U.S. His fifth wife, Blanka A. Rosenstiel, took over the Rosenstiel Foundation following his death in 1976.

His first wife, Dorothy Heller, contributed the funds which Rosenstiel used to start Schenley Industries. Rosenstiel's mother's family were Disraelis; when they bought the Johnson trading post in Ohio, they changed their name to Johnson.

=== Relationship with Roy Cohn and J. Edgar Hoover ===
Rosenstiel was a friend of attorney Roy Cohn, and together they formed the organization American Jewish League Against Communism. Cohn was eventually disbarred based on his attempt to fraudulently name himself co-executor of Rosenstiel's will by forcing a dying, semicomatose Rosenstiel to sign a codicil that Cohn falsely claimed was related to Rosenstiel's divorce. The incident happened in 1975, a year before his death, and Cohn was disbarred shortly before his own death from AIDS in 1986.

Rosenstiel was also friends with Federal Bureau of Investigation director J. Edgar Hoover, and was the primary contributor to the J. Edgar Hoover Foundation.

=== Conyers Farm ===
In 1936, Rosenstiel purchased the 1,481-acre estate of Edmund C. Converse, the first president of Banker's Trust. Conyers Farm, in Greenwich, Connecticut, which was one of "the great estates of America". It was larger than Central Park and Prospect Park combined, and had 52 rooms. In 1980, it was purchased by the paper magnate Peter Brant and developed into 95 10-acre sites, sold to celebrities, including Vince McMahon and Ron Howard.

== Death ==
Rosenstiel died in early 1976, in Miami Beach, Florida, at age 84.
