= Sidney Frank =

American businessman and philanthropist (1919–2006)

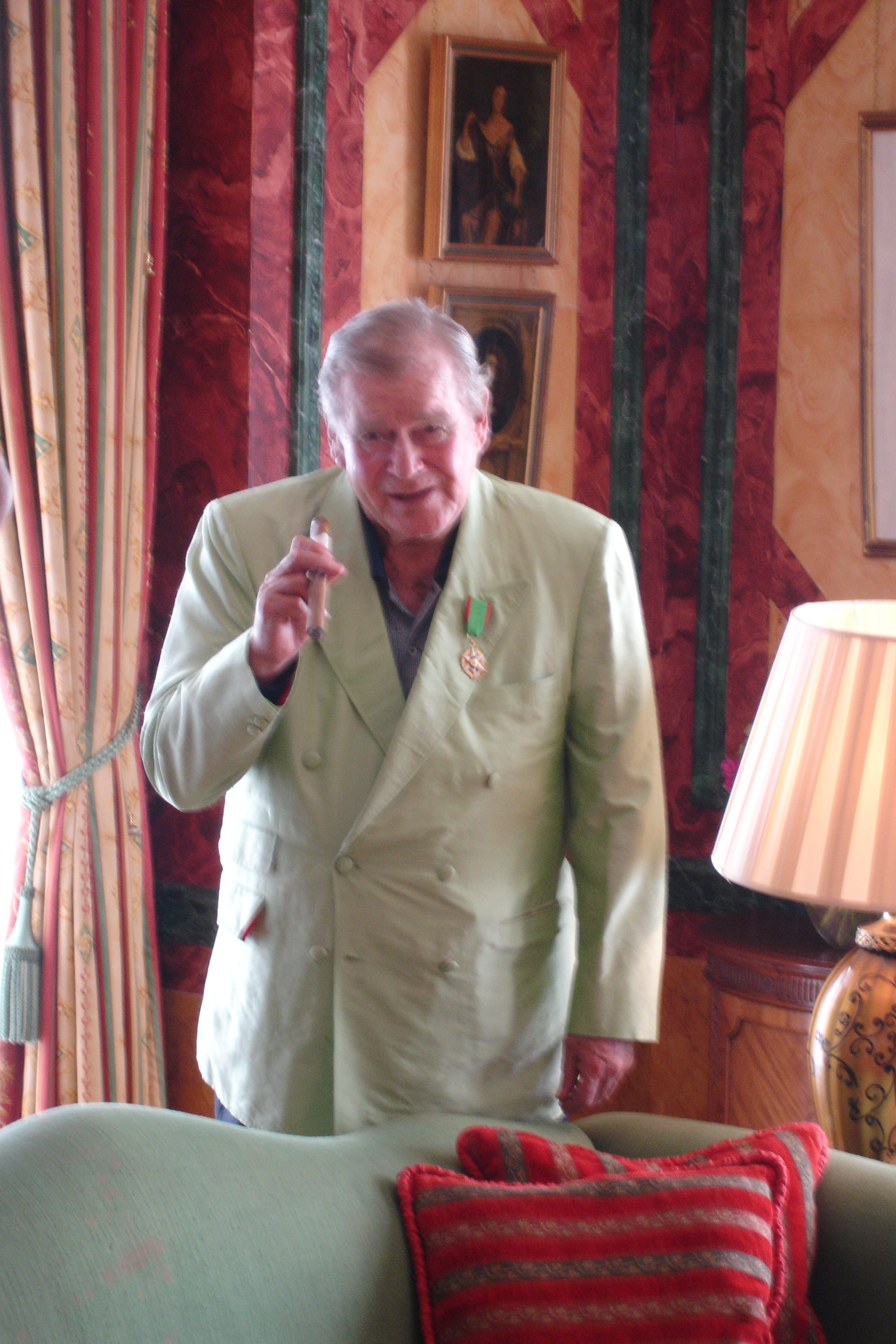
- Frank in 2005 wearing his medal of a Knight of the French Order of Agricultural Merit
- Born: October 2, 1919; Montville, Connecticut, US
- Died: January 10, 2006 (aged 86); San Francisco, California, US
- Education: Brown University
- Spouse(s): Louise Rosenstiel (died 1973); Marian Elinor Ombres
- Children: 2
- Family: Lewis Rosenstiel (father-in-law)

Sidney E. Frank (October 2, 1919 – January 10, 2006) was an American businessman and philanthropist. He became a billionaire through his promotion of Grey Goose vodka and Jägermeister.

== Early life, family, education ==
Frank was born to a Jewish family in Montville, Connecticut. His father and mother were Abraham and Sarah Frank. He grew up in Norwich, Connecticut, and graduated from the Norwich Free Academy in 1937. He attended Brown University (class of 1942) but left because he could only afford one year of tuition. He later made enormous gifts to the university to help ensure that no student would ever be forced to leave Brown because of inability to pay tuition. During World War II, Frank worked for Pratt and Whitney as a manufacturer's representative in India exploring ways to improve engine performance enabling aircraft to deal with the high altitudes encountered in the CBI theater. This was particularly important in improving the performance of transport aircraft flying supplies into China. The use of alcohol injection for aircraft engines was one of the approaches taken.

== Career ==
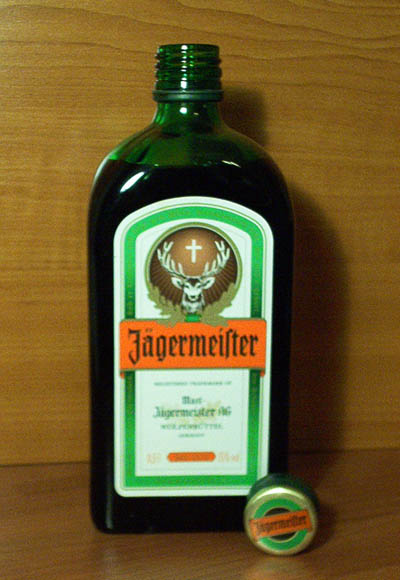

Frank's first wife, Louise "Skippy" Rosenstiel, was the daughter of Lewis Rosenstiel, founder of Schenley Industries, one of the largest American distillers and spirit importers. Frank joined Schenley after his marriage and rose to the company presidency, but was forced out in a family dispute in 1970.

In 1973 his wife died and he started his own company, Sidney Frank Importing Company, where he was chairman and chief executive officer. The company is based in New Rochelle, New York, where Frank lived (he had a home in Rancho Santa Fe, California, as well).

In 1973, he secured the importing rights to Jägermeister, a traditional German digestif.

Frank's first big success with his own company was with Jacques Cardin brandy, a brand he purchased from Seagram in 1979.

In the 1980s, Jägermeister became popular with college students in Louisiana and Frank promoted it heavily, turning a specialty brand developed to help with digestion into a mainstream success widely drunk in ice cold shots and used in Jello shooters.

In 1997, he developed Grey Goose vodka, made in France by François Thibault, and was so successful in promoting it that he sold the brand to Bacardi for $2 billion in June 2004. In the last years of his life, Frank bought the Travel Savvy and Business Traveler magazine titles for $4 million.

Crunk Energy was invented in 2004 by Frank. In 2017, Solvi acquired Crunk Energy. American Rapper Lil Jon stayed on as chief brand advisor.

== Philanthropy ==
Frank gave large bonuses to his employees and made a $12 million donation to The Norwich Free Academy in 2005. In October 2005, Frank donated £500,000 and a statue by sculptor Stephen Kettle to Bletchley Park Trust to fund a new Science Center dedicated to Alan Turing and, as a great supporter of the Supermarine Spitfire, commissioned a life-size statue of its designer, R. J. Mitchell, and funded a website dedicated to Mitchell's life: RJ Mitchell. A life in aviation.

He gave a donation of $5 million to the New York Medical College psychiatry department, leading to the creation of the Sidney Frank fellowship which gives medical students early exposure to the field of psychiatry.

His foundation has been a supporter of the Israel Olympic Committee and has helped to offer scholarships in several Israeli sports.

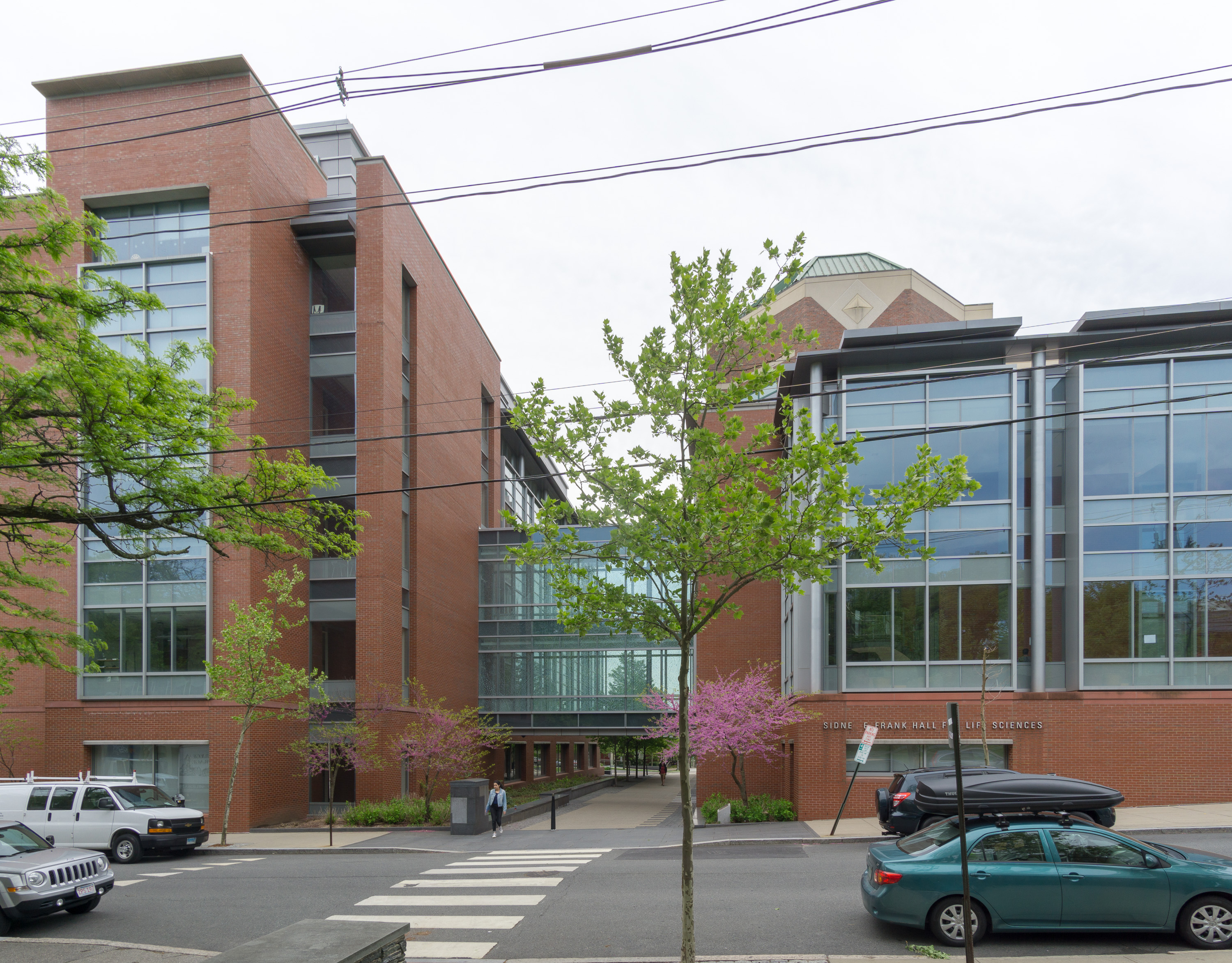
The Sidney E. Frank Hall for Life Sciences at Brown University

In 2004, Frank gave $100 million to his alma mater Brown University, at the time the largest single contribution in the university's history and still tied with two other gifts for that distinction. The gift provided for the Sidney E. Frank Scholarship which funds tuition for around 130 undergraduate students from low income families each year. In 2005, Frank donated $5 million to Brown to help with its Hurricane Katrina relief efforts. In 2006, Brown University named its Life Sciences building (the largest capital project to date) after Frank, in recognition of a $20 million gift to support its construction. Frank is the single most generous donor in the university's history.

== Personal life, death and aftermath ==
Frank married twice. His first wife, Louise "Skippy" Rosenstiel, was the daughter of Lewis Rosenstiel; she died in 1973, at the age of 50. They had two children: Matthew Frank and Cathy Frank Finkelstein Halstead, who was married and divorced from James A. Finkelstein, a son of Jerry Finkelstein. In 1975, he married Marian Elinor Ombres.

Frank died January 10, 2006, on a private plane in flight between San Diego, California, and Vancouver, British Columbia, at the age of 86 from heart failure. He was declared dead in San Francisco, California. On his plane were several nurses and medical doctors as well as a defibrillator, but he could not be revived. Services were held at Riverside Memorial Chapel. He is buried in the Rosenstiel family plot at United Jewish Cemeteries in Cincinnati. His daughter Cathy Frank Halstead is currently chairwoman of Sidney Frank Importing Company. She is also an artist and a co-founder of the Tippet Rise Art Center in Montana.

Daughter Cathy Frank figured prominently in a highly publicized case regarding her grandfather's will that led to the disbarment of the controversial lawyer Roy Cohn. In 1975, Cohn had entered the hospital room of a dying and comatose Rosenstiel, forced a pen to his hand, and lifted it to the will in an attempt to make himself and Cathy Frank beneficiaries. The resulting marks were determined in court to be indecipherable and in no way a valid signature. In 1986, Cohn was disbarred for unethical and unprofessional conduct in the case, as well as for misappropriation of clients' funds and lying on a bar application.

Sidney Frank, and his son Matthew Frank, also sued the Rosenstiel estate, each in a separate action.

Jägermeister bought the entire company and Cathy Frank is no longer an officer in the Jägermeister owned company.

Sidney Frank Importing Company (SFIC) changed its name to Mast-Jägermeister US after its takeover by the German herbal liqueur producer in 2015.
