= War of ideas =

Confrontation among ideologies

In the political field, a war of ideas is a confrontation among the ideologies that nations and political groups use to promote their domestic and foreign interests. In a war of ideas, the battle space is the public mind: the belief of the people who compose the population. This ideological conflict is about winning the hearts and minds of the people. Waging a war of ideas can involve think tanks, television programs, journalistic articles (newspaper, magazine, weblogs), government policies, and public diplomacy. In the monograph: 'Wars of Ideas and The War of Ideas' (2008), Antulio J. Echevarria defined the war of ideas as:

A clash of visions, concepts, and images, and — especially — the interpretation of them. They are, indeed, genuine wars, even though the physical violence might be minimal, because they serve a political, socio-cultural, or economic purpose, and they involve hostile intentions or hostile acts. ... Four general categories [include] ... (i) intellectual debates, (ii) ideological wars, (iii) wars over religious dogma, and (iv) advertising campaigns. All of [the categories] are essentially about power and influence, just as with wars over territory and material resources, and their stakes can run very high indeed.

== History of the concept ==
On résiste à l'invasion des armées; on ne résiste pas à l'invasion des idées.
One resists the invasion of armies; one does not resist the invasion of ideas.

— Victor-Marie Hugo (1802–1885), Histoire d'un Crime (The History of a Crime), Conclusion, ch. X. Trans. T.H. Joyce and Arthur Locker; written 1852, published 1877

The ideas of economists and political philosophers, both when they are right and when they are wrong, are more powerful than is commonly understood. Indeed, the world is ruled by little else. Practical men, who believe themselves to be quite exempt from any intellectual influences, are usually the slaves of some defunct economist. Madmen in authority, who hear voices in the air, are distilling their frenzy from some academic scribbler of a few years back.

— John Maynard Keynes, The General Theory of Employment, Interest, and Money (1936), chapter xxiv

Richard M. Weaver published Ideas Have Consequences in 1948 by the University of Chicago Press. The book is largely a treatise on the harmful effects of nominalism on Western civilization since that doctrine gained prominence in the High Middle Ages, followed by a prescription of a course of action through which Weaver believes the West might be rescued from its decline. Weaver attributes the beginning of the Western decline to the adoption of nominalism (or the rejection of the notion of absolute truth) in the late Scholastic period.

In 1993, Heritage Foundation analyst James A. Phillips used the term "war of ideas" in describing the pivotal role played by the National Endowment for Democracy (NED) in the ideological battle for the protection of democracy. Phillips defended the NED as "an important weapon in the war of ideas," against communist dictatorships in control of China, Cuba, North Korea, and Vietnam. In a Cato Institute foreign policy brief, it was argued that there was no longer a need for the NED because "the democratic West has won the war of ideas against its communist adversaries." Gingrich declared,

The Heritage Foundation is without question the most far-reaching conservative organization in the country in the war of ideas, and one that has had a tremendous impact not just in Washington, but literally across the planet.

— Speaker of the House, Newt Gingrich, November 15, 1994

"By the 1990s the term "war of ideas" was used to polarize debates on economic systems with socialism and central planning on one end of the spectrum and free enterprise and private property on the other." In 2008, Antulio J. Echevarria in his monograph entitled Wars of Ideas and the War of Ideas, "offers a brief examination of four common types of wars of ideas, and analyzes how the US, its allies and strategic partners might proceed in the war of ideas." While he feels that a better understanding of these differences between wars of ideas can inform strategy, Echevarria "concludes that physical events, whether designed or incidental, are in some respects more important to the course and outcome of a war of ideas than the ideas themselves."

for instance, that because ideas are interpreted subjectively, it is not likely that opposing parties will "win" each other over by means of an ideational campaign alone. Hence, physical events, whether intended or incidental, typically play determining roles in the ways wars of ideas unfold, and how (or whether) they are end. Thus, while the act of communicating strategically remains a vital part of any war of ideas, we need to manage our expectations as far as what it can accomplish.

— Antulio Joseph Echevarria, 2008

In a New York Times Magazine series commemorating the 10th anniversary of the September 11 attacks, a round table was held bringing together Paul Berman, Scott Malcomson, James Traub, David Rieff, Ian Burama and Michael Ignatieff. Malcomson observed,

The American reaction to being attacked on September 11 was in many ways an intellectual one. President George W. Bush tended to frame it that way: the attack was on our "values," and the "war against terror" was a war of ideas meant to advance the idea of freedom

— Scott Malcomson, A Decade of War., 2011-09-11:38

Defense Secretary Donald Rumsfeld was the administration's epistemologist, worrying over the question of knowability; Bernard Lewis was its historian, Paul Wolfowitz its moralist in arms. That America's actions (as opposed to precautions) after 9/11 almost all took place far from home, with a professional army, strengthened this sense of abstraction. The possibility of anything like victory over our enemies was discounted early on (by Rumsfeld). Little wonder that, unlike in earlier wars, we have talked so much about what this conflict means, rather than simply working to end it as soon as possible

— Scott Malcomson, New York Times Magazine, September 7, 2011

== Intellectual debates as wars of ideas ==
Intellectual debates spiral into wars of ideas when academic concepts of neutrality and objectivity are abandoned and issues devolve into embittered and divisive disputes. Echevarria argued (2008) that in the United States topics such as abortion, intelligent design and evolution are wars of ideas. When an intellectual debate devolves into a war of ideas,

... [o]pposing sides seldom change their positions based on the introduction of new evidence, or new ways of evaluating existing evidence. Thus, wars of ideas are rarely settled on the merits of the ideas themselves. Instead, they tend to drag on, unless an event occurs that causes the belligerents to focus their attention elsewhere (Echevarria).

— Strategic Studies Institute of the US Army War College (SSI)

Echevarria uses Kuhn's controversial incommensurability thesis as a claim to relativism and therefore a defense of engagement in the war of ideas.

== In U.S. politics ==
According to political scientist Andrew Rich, author of Think Tanks, Public Policy, and the Politics of Expertise, the "war of ideas" is "fundamentally a battle between liberals and conservatives, progressives and libertarians, over the appropriate role for government."

In the early 2010s, Thomas E. Mann and Norm Ornstein claim that the dysfunctionality of American politics was worse than it had ever been up to that point, saying that "the partisan and ideological polarization from which we now suffer comes at a time when critical problems cry out for resolution, making for a particularly toxic mix."

The extreme and asymmetric partisan polarization that has evolved over several decades, initially reflecting increasing ideological differences but then extending well beyond issues that ordinarily divide the parties to advance strategic electoral interests, fits uneasily with a set of governing institutions that puts up substantial barriers to majority rule. To improve that fit—either by producing less polarized combatants or by making political institutions and practices more responsive to parliamentary-like parties—we as a people need to think about ambitious reforms of electoral rules and governing arrangements. The former can include, for example, focusing more on the demand side of campaign finance than on the supply side.

— Thomas E. Mann and Norm Ornstein (2012)

Bruce Thornton of the Hoover Institute argues that polarization is good for democracy and that "bipartisan compromise is deeply over-rated."

Darrell West, the vice president and director of governance studies at the Brookings Institution, claims that we are living in "parallel political universes seemingly unable to comprehend or deal with each other." "Compromise has become a dirty word among many news reporters, voters, and advocacy organizations, and this limits leaders' capacity to address important policy problems." This makes it difficult for leaders to "lead and govern effectively". Those outside of government, such as "individuals, advocacy groups, businesses, and the news media" must recognize how "their own behaviours hinder leadership and make it difficult for elected and administrative officials to bargain and negotiate." Policy-making today is "plagued by extreme partisan polarization". News coverage does not inform civic discussions. There is a lack of political civility. Political practices discourage compromise, bargaining, and negotiation.

=== Foreign policy ===
There are two principal schools of thought on how to approach the war of ideas. The first approach advocates treating the conflict as a matter best addressed through public diplomacy—defined as the conveyance of information across a broad spectrum to include cultural affairs and political action. Accordingly, this view calls for revitalizing or transforming the U.S. Department of State and many of the traditional tools of statecraft. This school of thought contends that American public diplomacy declined after the Cold War, as evidenced by the demise of the U.S. Information Agency in 1999, and the reduction or elimination of strategic communications programs such as "Voice of America," and Radio Free Europe/Radio Liberty. The remedy, then, according to this view, is to re-engage the world, especially the Arab-Muslim world, by revitalizing both the form and content of U.S. public diplomacy and strategic communications, and by reinforcing those communications with concrete programs that invest in people, create opportunities for positive exchanges, and help build friendships. In fact, Radio Free Europe/Radio Liberty, and its Iraqi component, Radio Free Iraq, and Al-Hurra TV are now actively participating in U.S. strategic communication efforts, though with debatable effectiveness; all this has occurred, in part, by taking resources from Voice of America.

In direct contrast, the second school of thought advocates treating the war of ideas as a "real war," wherein the objective is to destroy the influence and credibility of the opposing ideology, to include neutralizing its chief proponents. This approach sees public diplomacy as an essential, but insufficient tool because it requires too much time to achieve desired results, and does little to aid the immediate efforts of combat forces in the field. For this school of thought, the principal focus of the war of ideas ought to be how to use the ways and means of information warfare to eliminate terrorist groups.

== In Canadian politics ==
Tom Flanagan observed that Calgary School political science professors, Barry Cooper, Ted Morton, (Note: F.L. (Ted) Morton applies neoconservative views to the Canadian legal system, especially the Canadian Charter of Rights and Freedoms (CSIS 1998:10) He was elected to the Alberta legislature, ran for leadership of the Alberta Progressive Conservatives. Danielle Smith, a student of the Calgary School influenced then Premier of Alberta, Ed Stelmach's, appointment of Ted Morton as Alberta's Minister of Finance (Flanagan 2010).) Rainer Knopff and history professor David Bercuson and their students Stephen Harper, Ezra Levant played an 'honourable part" in helping conservatives win "the war of ideas" in Canada.

== Use during the Cold War ==
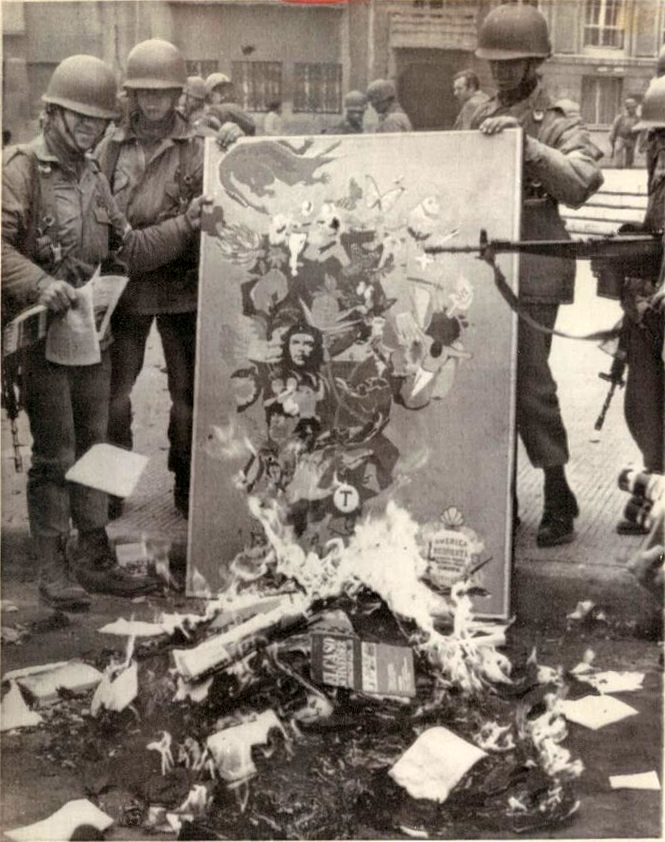
Book burnings in Chile following the 1973 coup that installed the Pinochet regime. Note the painting with a Che Guevara portrait being burned.

According to Dr. John Lenczowski, former Director of European and Soviet Affairs for the National Security Council during the Reagan administration, 'The Cold War took many forms, including proxy wars, the arms race, nuclear blackmail, economic warfare, subversion, covert operations and the battle for men's minds. While many of these forms had the trappings of traditional conflicts of national interests, there was a dimension to the Cold War that made it unique among wars: it centered around a war of ideas—a war between two alternative political philosophies.

During the Cold War, the United States and other Western powers developed a robust infrastructure for waging a war of ideas against the communist ideology being promulgated by the Soviet Union and its allies. During the administrations of Harry S. Truman and Dwight D. Eisenhower, the so-called golden age of U.S. propaganda, counterpropaganda, and public diplomacy operations, the U.S. government carried out a sophisticated program of overt and covert activities designed to shape public opinion behind the Iron Curtain, within European intellectual and cultural circles, and across the developing world. The United States was able to reach as much as 50–70% of the populations behind the Iron Curtain during the 1950s through their international broadcasting. High-level interest in such operations waned during the 1970s, but received renewed emphasis under President Ronald Reagan, the Great Communicator, who, like Dwight D. Eisenhower, was a firm advocate of the informational component of America's Cold War strategy.

However, with the end of the Cold War official interest once again plummeted. During the 1990s, Congress and the executive branch disparaged informational activities as costly Cold War anachronisms. The budget for State Department informational programs was slashed, and USIA, a quasi-independent body that reported to the secretary of state, was disestablished, and its responsibilities were transferred to a new undersecretary of state for public diplomacy.

== Use in the war on terror ==
Terrorism is a form of political and psychological warfare; it is protracted, high-intensity propaganda, aimed more at the hearts of the public and the minds of decision makers, and not at the physical victims. There is growing recognition among U.S. government officials, journalists, and analysts of terrorism that defeating al-Qaida—arguably the preeminent challenge to U.S. security—will require far more than neutralizing leaders, disrupting cells, and dismantling networks. The 9/11 Commission concluded in its final report, eliminating al-Qaida as a formidable danger ultimately requires prevailing in the longer term over the ideology that gives rise to Islamist terrorism."

As Akbar Ahmed, a Muslim scholar who holds the Chair of Islamic Studies at American University, argues: Properly understood, this is a war of ideas within Islam—some of them faithful to authentic Islam, but some of them clearly un-Islamic and even blasphemous toward the peaceful and compassionate Allah of the Qur'an.

Waging a blatantly ideological struggle seems unnatural to some Americans. Westerners tend to downplay intangible factors such as ideas, history, and culture as political motivators, preferring instead to stress more concrete driving forces such as personal security and physical well-being.

The United States military has recently begun incorporating a strategic communication into their overall battle operations in the war on terror, especially in Afghanistan and Iraq. In addition to the military's traditional role of using force they are beginning to use political as well as ideological warfare against the enemy as a method of influencing the local populations into opposing say the Taliban or al Qa'ida. The ancient Chinese philosopher Sun Tzu once said that to fight and conquer in all your battles is not supreme excellence; supreme excellence consists in breaking the enemy's resistance without fighting. The War of Ideas attempts to "break the enemy's resistance."

== Terrorists' use of mass media ==
Users of terror tactics' strategic communications goals are aimed at legitimizing, propagating, and intimidating their audience. Their skilful use of the mass media and the internet has enabled them to keep generating new generations of followers.

Al-Qaida's message, disseminated widely and effectively through all forms of mass media, including the Internet, has a powerful appeal in much of the Muslim world. In 2007, an al-Qaeda spokesman described Osama bin Laden's strategic influence of mass media in the Arab world:

Sheikh Usama knows that the media war is not less important than the military war against America. That's why al-Qaeda has many media wars. The Sheikh has made al-Qaeda's media strategy something that all TV stations look for. There are certain criteria for the stations to be able to air our videos, foremost of which is that it has not taken a previous stand against the mujahedeen. That maybe explains why we prefer Al-Jazeera to the rest.

The intensive, sometimes obsessive coverage in the media about a terrorist act generates the desired psychological effect. Terrorist actions are planned and organized in a manner that causes a strategically maximum communicative effect, while requiring minimal resources. The symbiotic relationship between terror events and the media is apparent: the perpetrators would have far less impact without media publicity and the media can hardly be expected to resist reporting. Satellite TV and the internet offers terrorists expanded possibilities of influencing and manipulating audiences.

== See also ==
- Political warfare
- Cultural diplomacy
- Propaganda
- Counterterrorism
- PSYOP
- Information Operations
- United States Information Agency
- Counterinsurgency
- Music and political warfare
