= Paul A. Goble =

American analyst, writer and columnist with expertise on Russia and Baltic states

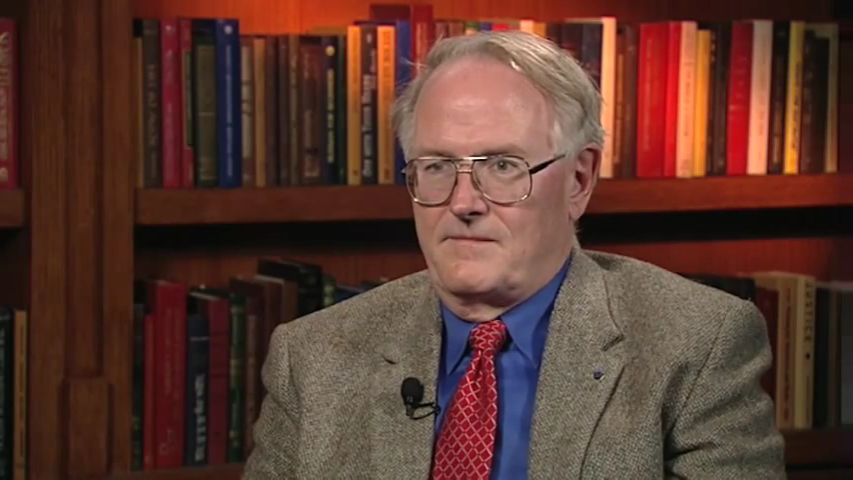
Image of Paul A. Goble

Paul A. Goble (born 1949) is an American analyst, writer and columnist with expertise on Russia. Trained at Miami University (B.A., 1970) and the University of Chicago (M.A., 1973), he is the editor of four volumes on ethnic issues in the former Soviet Union and has published more than 150 articles on ethnic and nationality questions. Goble served as special adviser on Soviet nationality issues and Baltic affairs to Secretary of State James Baker.

Currently, he teaches a course on "Islam and Geopolitics in Eurasia" as an adjunct professor at the Institute of World Politics.

== Career ==
- Director of Research and Publications, Azerbaijan Diplomatic Academy
- University of Tartu (Estonia), former Professor
- International Broadcasting Bureau, Special Advisor to the Director
- Voice of America, Senior Advisor to the Director
- Radio Free Europe/Radio Liberty, Assistant Director for Broadcasting and Director of Communications
- Senior Associate, Carnegie Endowment for International Peace
- Special Advisor on Soviet Nationality Problems, U.S. Department of State
- Deputy Director, Research Department, Radio Liberty
- Analyst on Soviet Nationalities, Department of State's Bureau of Intelligence and Research, Central Intelligence Agency.
- Adjunct professor at the Institute of World Politics, teaching a course on "Islam and Geopolitics in Eurasia".
- Is presently a columnist for Euromaidan Press

== Awards ==
Paul Goble has been decorated with these state awards for his role in promoting the recovery of Baltic independence:

- Order of the Cross of Terra Mariana, Estonia
- Order of the Three Stars, Latvia
- Order of the Lithuanian Grand Duke Gediminas, Lithuania

== Published works ==
Books

- The Situation in Russia: October 1993, Briefing of the Commission on Security and Cooperation in Europe, United States Congress, 1993 (with Ariel Cohen).

Articles

- "Russia and Its Neighbors", Foreign Policy, No. 90 (Spring, 1993), Carnegie Endowment for International Peace
- "Forget the Soviet Union", Foreign Policy, No. 86 (Spring, 1992), Carnegie Endowment for International Peace
- "Chechnya and Its Consequences", Post-Soviet Affairs, 1995
- "Russia as a Failed State: Difficulties and Foreign Challenges", Baltic Defense Review, 2004
