= Henry D. Sokolski =

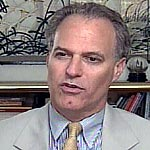
Sokolski in 2005

Henry D. Sokolski is the founder and executive director of the Nonproliferation Policy Education Center, a Washington, D.C.–based think tank promoting a better understanding of strategic weapons proliferation issues among policymakers, scholars, and the media. He teaches as an adjunct professor at The Institute of World Politics in Washington, D.C., and at the University of Utah and has an appointment as senior fellow for nuclear security studies at the University of California at San Diego's School of Global Policy and Strategy.

Sokolski is regularly quoted by journalists covering nuclear issues. When Russia seized Ukraine's Zaporizhzhia nuclear power plant in 2022, Sokolski was quoted in articles in The New York Times, Reuters, and The Washington Post.

== Education ==
Sokolski attended the University of Southern California and Pomona College and completed graduate studies in political science at the University of Chicago.

== Career ==
From 1989 to 1993, Sokolski served as the Deputy for Nonproliferation Policy in the Office of the Secretary of Defense, for which he received the U.S. Secretary of Defense's Medal for Outstanding Public Service. Prior to this, he worked in the Secretary of Defense's Office of Net Assessment on strategic weapons proliferation issues.

In addition to his executive branch service, Sokolski worked in Congress from 1984 through 1988 as senior military legislative aide to U.S. Senate Armed Services Committee member Dan Quayle and from 1982 through 1983 as special assistant on nuclear energy matters to TVA Subcommittee Chairman Senator Gordon J. Humphrey.

He worked as a consultant on nuclear weapons proliferation issues to the intelligence community's National Intelligence Council, received a Congressional appointment to the Deutch Proliferation Commission, which completed its report in July 1999, served as a member of the Central Intelligence Agency's senior advisory panel from 1995 to 1996, and was a member of the Commission on the Prevention of WMD proliferation and terrorism, which operated until 2010.

Sokolski has been a resident fellow at the National Institute for Public Policy, The Heritage Foundation, and the Hoover Institution. He has taught political science courses at the University of Chicago, Rosary College, Georgetown University, and Loyola University.

He is a member of the Council on Foreign Relations and IISS and is on the editorial board of The Nonproliferation Review. In a detailed 2018 profile of Sokolski, Congressional Quarterly described him as one of Washington, D.C.'s key "influencers", a rare Washingtonian willing to play "a longer game." The National Journal recognized Sokolski as one of the ten key individuals whose ideas will help shape the policy debate on the future of nuclear weapons.

== Publications ==
Sokolski has authored and edited a number of books on nuclear proliferation, including:

- China, Russia, and the Coming Cool War (Nonproliferation Policy Education Center, 2024)
- Underestimated: Our Not So Peaceful Nuclear Future (Carlisle, PA: Strategic Studies Institute, 2016)
- Best of Intentions: America's Campaign Against Strategic Weapons Proliferation (Westport, CT: Praeger, 2001)
- Should We Let the Bomb Spread? (Carlisle, PA: Strategic Studies Institute, 2016)
- Moving Beyond Pretense: Nuclear Power and Nonproliferation, (Carlisle, PA: Strategic Studies Institute, 2014)
- Nuclear Weapons Security Crises: What Does History Teach?, (Carlisle, PA: Strategic Studies Institute, 2013)
- The Next Arms Race, (Carlisle, PA: Strategic Studies Institute, 2012)
- Nuclear Power's Global Expansion: Weighing Its Costs and Risks,(Carlisle, PA: Strategic Studies Institute, 2011)
- Falling Behind: International Scrutiny of the Peaceful Atom, (Carlisle, PA: Strategic Studies Institute, 2008)
- Getting MAD: Nuclear Mutual Assured Destruction Its Origins and Practice (Carlisle, PA: Strategic Studies Institute, 2004)
