= Public diplomacy of South Korea =

The term public diplomacy was first coined and used by Edmund Gullion in 1965 and the concept developed gradually. More recently, the definition of public diplomacy differs according to different authors. Taehwan Kim in his article "Paradigm Shift in Diplomacy: A Conceptual Model for Korea's 'New Public Diplomacy'" defines it as "a diplomatic practice or field of academic research which includes non-conventional actors (such as NGOs or civil societies) to promote diplomacy of the people". As the importance of public diplomacy increases, South Korea is putting more efforts to engage in the new trend of diplomacy. Muzaffar S. Abduazimov in his article "Public Diplomacy: Reappraising the South Korean Case through an Evolutionary Approach" presents four evolutionary periods of South Korean public diplomacy: origins (late 1940s–late 1980s), diversification (early 1990s), polycentrism (early 2000s), and institutionalization (2011–present).

== Categories ==
Diverse realms of public diplomacy exist within South Korea including knowledge diplomacy, cultural diplomacy, Korean studies diplomacy, corporate diplomacy and sports and tourism diplomacy.

1. Knowledge Diplomacy

Knowledge diplomacy is a sub-category of public diplomacy which utilizes a nation's successful policies, institutions, and values, accumulated and formulated through its own historical development, as soft power assets. As information becomes the most important asset for people in the 21st century, there exists a race to acquire more information which is dispersed in massive quantity with diverse methods. Under the given circumstances, it is imperative to note that abundant information is likely to contribute to miscommunication and misunderstanding which can further lead to potential conflicts. Thus, disseminating correct information and knowledge through communication is essential. When South Korea attempts to practice knowledge diplomacy, its dissemination of Korean Values should not conflict with the universal values.

1. Cultural Diplomacy
2. Korean Studies Diplomacy
3. Corporate Diplomacy
4. Sports and Tourism Diplomacy

== South Korea's soft power through the Korean Wave and Hallyu ==
The creators of Hallyu or the Korean Wave attempt to create it so that people from other countries will like it is by focusing on the commonalities between Korea and other countries. The thought process behind that technique of packaging is the fact that the Koreans feel if people from other countries see them as similar people they are more likely to have a positive opinion of Korea and Korean culture/pop culture; Kuwahara calls this technique of focusing on similarities "psychic distance". Another goal of looking the psychic distance is the attempt to make the products more easily marketable. The Koreans want to get rid of any obstacle or tentativeness that people from other countries may have about Korea and they see the use of Hallyu as a way to accomplish that goal. The Korean government also had the goal of affecting other countries through these uses of their pop culture.

Kuwahara indicates that Korea used "soft power" to impact other countries; soft power simply means anything except military used to influence other countries. Due to the fact that Korea can not truly compete against other countries like the United States and China with very large and powerful militaries, this use of soft power through promotion of the Korean pop culture is a viable option for them in terms of their relationships with other countries. Age and newness also play roles in the effect that this technique has on other countries in the eyes of the Koreans. Additionally, Hallyu "has enlarged the circle of [South Korean] public diplomacy actors, structurally transforming it from solely state-led activity into polycentric framework of public and private partnership", leading it to polycentrism period.

== South Korea's MOFA and public diplomacy ==
The South Korean Ministry of Foreign Affairs is initiating a new approach to expand its public diplomatic practices. There is a separate section in the website of South Korean MOFA on public diplomacy to provide information on what public diplomacy is, on the historical background and on the initiatives being taken. Moreover, there exists a public diplomacy portal under the MOFA which will enable more people to engage in the development of South Korea's public diplomacy.

== Shortcomings ==
- Drawbacks regarding cultural diplomacy

One of the prominent obstacles is that "cultural diplomacy is largely dominated by cultural contents, which the government tends to rely on the private sector to produce". The limited source of investment is problematic in that the private industry is relatively volatile to changes in circumstances such as the economic situation in the market or changes in the corporation's own situations. Furthermore, the Korean Wave "may push South Korea into a narrow trap of cultural diplomacy" blocking the enhancement of other public diplomatic sectors. This problem is rooted in the fact that the public sector is reluctant to initiate a policy to establish a concrete plan on public diplomacy but rather rely on the already existing contents in the private market, and thus, "it is hard to expect that ideas based on its current strategy could develop into actual policies".

- South Korean government's lack of concrete strategy for public diplomacy

To investigate deeper in the public sector's lack of leadership considering public diplomacy, it can be found that South Korea's government lacks a consistent conception or concrete strategy for public diplomacy that will enable South Korea to reinforce its stance in soft power. The current situation is that there is an absence of systematic co-operation among the major organizations relevant to public diplomacy or even the organizations itself to deal with public diplomacy effectively which makes the decision making process and the policy implementation to be inefficient. The situation even exacerbates when there exists ministerial jurisdictional rivalry over public diplomacy because several ministries try to expand their rights over popular sectors such as the Korean Wave and this leads to the overlapping jurisdiction over the same sector. The seriousness of this situation can be explained by Taehwan Kim's analysis: "There are one presidential council, three ministries and at least twenty-four public organizations pursuing public diplomacy and wanting to lead the policies and activities of public diplomacy". The government is in an advantageous position to strengthen its cultural influence in varying regions in that the influence is not limited to certain economic restraints that the private sector faces and that the influence can be in different shapes depending on the cultural or other features of a certain nation. For example, the private sector faces limits when they aim to impress the Western society and the African society at the same time with their limited business items. However, the government can initiate a public diplomatic plan which will respectively handle different regions in the world. When the government is only concentrated in attempting to gain benefits from the cultural diplomacy founded by the private sector rather than creating a plan on their own, the systematic growth of public diplomacy becomes a more difficult task.

- Lack of systematic co-operation between the government and the civil society

The lack of systematic co-operation between the government and the public hinders the firm founding of public diplomacy and the application in the society as a whole. Because of this, the most important aspect in public diplomacy which is a communication channel between the government and the public to facilitate public diplomacy with mutual assistance is lacking. Joseph Nye categorizes the three dimensions of public diplomacy that, he claims, "help a nation accomplish its goals through diplomatic activities: daily communication; strategic communication; and the sustainable relationship among individuals through academic activities, exchanges, training, seminars and diverse media channels". These activities that the public needs to work on to create a content that will boost the public diplomacy is not available unless the government takes the initiative to form a systematic ground to lay the cornerstone for discussion and expand the participation in realms of public diplomacy which are not being dealt with to the fullest extent until now.
