= Mackubin Thomas Owens =

American historian

- Nickname: "Mac"
- Born: November 16, 1945 (age 80); Bryan, Texas, U.S.
- Allegiance: United States of America
- Branch: United States Marine Corps
- Rank: Colonel
- Conflicts: Vietnam War
- Awards: Silver Star
- Other work: Author

Mackubin Thomas Owens is an American scholar who was a senior fellow at the Foreign Policy Research Institute. From 2015 until 2018, he served as dean of academic affairs at the Institute of World Politics. He was previously the associate dean of academics for electives and directed research and professor of strategy and force planning for the Naval War College in the U.S., as well as a contributing editor to National Review.

== Career ==
Owens has previously served as a national security advisor to Senator Bob Kasten and in the Department of Energy under the Reagan administration. From 1990 to 1997, Owens was editor-in-chief of the defense journal Strategic Review and an adjunct professor of international relations at what is now the Pardee School of Global Studies at Boston University.

Owens served as an infantry platoon commander from 1968 to 1969 in Vietnam during the Vietnam War, during which he was wounded twice, and awarded the Silver Star. He retired from the Marine Corps Reserve as a colonel in 1994. He holds a Ph.D in politics from the University of Dallas, a Master of Arts in economics from the University of Oklahoma, and a Bachelor of Arts from the University of California, Santa Barbara.

His book, US Civil-Military Relations After 9/11: Renegotiating the Civil-Military Bargain, was published by Continuum in January 2011. It explains some of the key issues that surround the relations between the military and its civilian control in the US today.

Owens contends "that women in combat undermine unit cohesion and thereby generate Clausewitzian friction."
