= François Thibault =

French Maître de Chai from Cognac

- Born: Cognac, France
- Occupation: Maître de Chai
- Employer: Bacardi
- Known for: Developing the recipe for Grey Goose vodka

François Thibault is a French Maître de Chai (Cellar Master) from Cognac. He is best known for developing the recipe for Grey Goose vodka as well as several other brands of liquor.

== Early life and education ==
Thibault grew up in Cognac, France where his father was a wine-grower. He trained to become a Maître de Chai at a fairly young age, in the regions of Bordeaux and Burgundy. He officially received the title in 1992.

== Career ==
After his studies he worked for cognac distilleries in Cognac, including H. Mounier. One of his clients was Sidney Frank, who imported liquor from Europe into the United States, for which Thibault created the cognac Jacques Cardin along with other cognacs and brandies.

Thibault was approached by Frank in 1997 about his idea for a new kind of vodka: Grey Goose vodka. Thibault created the original recipe for Grey Goose, using ingredients found in a region recommended to him by French pastry chefs. He has remained the cellar master for Grey Goose since its founding, and supervises all aspects of the vodka's production. He was also the developer of Grey Goose's additional flavors, including cherry, lemon, and orange. In 2013 he was featured in a Grey Goose ad that focuses on the initial controversy of making vodka as a Maître de Chai, and the eventual acceptance of the practice in France.
