= S. Eugene Poteat =

American intelligence executive (1930–2022)

Samuel Eugene Poteat
- Born: 1930; Bessemer City, North Carolina, U.S.
- Died: May 22, 2022 (aged 91–92)
- Occupation: CIA executive

Samuel Eugene Poteat (1930–2022) was a senior Central Intelligence Agency (CIA) executive. He was awarded the CIA's Intelligence Medal of Merit and the National Reconnaissance Office Meritorious Civilian Award. He was president of the Association of Former Intelligence Officers (AFIO) for 15 years, retiring in 2014, and was appointed AFIO's president-emeritus in 2015.

== Biography ==
Poteat graduated from The Citadel with a B.S. in Electrical Engineering in 1957, and held a master's degree in Statecraft and National Security Affairs with a specialization in Intelligence Studies from the Institute of World Politics in Washington, D.C., and was awarded a LL.D. in 2010 for his service to intelligence education and to the profession. He also took post-doctorate courses in foreign policy, national security, and intelligence at Cambridge University.

After college, Poteat worked for Bell Telephone Laboratories in New Jersey and Cape Canaveral. He joined the Central Intelligence Agency (CIA) in 1960, and worked there for 30 years, also serving abroad in London and Scandinavia.

Poteat was involved in analysis of some events of the Gulf of Tonkin incident. In the fall of 1999, he wrote that he was asked in early August 1964 to determine if the radar operator's report (for August 4) showed a real torpedo boat attack or an imagined one. He asked for further details on time, weather and surface conditions. No further details were forthcoming. In the end he concluded that there were no torpedo boats on the night in question, and that the White House was interested only in confirmation of an attack, not that there was no such attack.

Poteat was a program manager for the sensors on the Lockheed U-2 and the Lockheed A-12 OXCART. He wrote about intelligence problems in the AFIO newsletter, its Intelligencer Journal and for "The Guide to the Study of Intelligence". He was written about in Wired Magazine, and in a book about CIA science and technology.

Poteat served on the Board of Advisors of the International Spy Museum. He was also Professor Emeritus at the Institute of World Politics in Washington, D.C., teaching a course on "Technology, Intelligence, Security, and Statecraft".

Poteat received an honorary doctorate from the Institute of World Politics in Washington, D.C., in 2010. He was a 32nd degree Freemason, a member of the Dorchester Lodge No. 369 of North Charleston, South Carolina, and a member of the Scottish Rite Bodies of Charleston. He died on May 22, 2022.
