= Chopin Foundation of the United States =

US non-profit organization

Founded by Blanka Rosenstiel in 1977, the Chopin Foundation of the United States provides performance opportunities for young American pianists, exchange and scholarship programs as well as awards.

Every five years the Foundation hosts the National Chopin Piano Competition (traditionally held in Miami, Florida), the only major U.S. competition open to American citizens only. The Foundation pays for top winners of the U.S. competition to fly to Warsaw, Poland, and compete in the International Frederick Chopin Piano Competition, the oldest and one of the most important competitions in the world. The 2005 National Chopin Piano Competition awarded Shanghai-born Mei-Ting Sun the first prize. Eric Lu won the 2015 competition.

The Chopin Foundation presents several free concert series in cities like Miami, San Francisco and Seattle through its regional councils, and collaborates with schools and universities on a local level to promote and raise awareness of its programs to potential career pianists.

In 2007 the Chopin Foundation celebrated its thirtieth anniversary with a benefit performance by Martha Argerich and a gala.

In 2023, Blanka Rosenstiel continued to run the foundation as its president.
