= Peter Debbins =

American spy for Russia

- Born: Peter Rafael Dzibinski Debbins; 1975 (age 50–51); Minnesota, U.S.
- Education: University of Minnesota
- Occupation: Former U.S. Army Green Beret
- Known for: Espionage
- Criminal charge: Conspiracy to gather or deliver defense information to aid a foreign government
- Criminal penalty: 188 months in prison
- Criminal status: Incarcerated at ADX Florence
- Spouse: Yelena
- Espionage activity
- Country: United States
- Allegiance: Russia
- Service branch: United States Army
- Service years: 1998–2005
- Rank: Captain
- Codename: Ikar Lesnikov

Peter Rafael Dzibinski Debbins is an American convicted spy for Russia and a former military officer in the U.S. Army's Special Forces. In August 2020, he was arrested and charged with conspiracy to provide classified defense information to Russian intelligence services. Debbins pleaded guilty in federal court to one count of conspiracy to commit espionage on November 18, 2020.

== Early life ==
Debbins' mother was a Russian-speaking Polish-Ukrainian and was born in Zaporozhye, Ukraine. Reportedly, her parents survived the Holodomor.

Debbins was born and raised in Minnesota. Debbins met and married his wife in Russia in 1997.

== Education ==
In 1997, Debbins graduated from the University of Minnesota, where he was a member of the Reserve Officers' Training Corps.

In 2015, he graduated with a master's degree in Strategic and International Studies from The Institute of World Politics.

== Military service ==
In July 1998, Debbins began his active service duty in the Army. From 1998 to 2005, he was deployed overseas in Korea, Germany, and Azerbaijan. During this time, Debbins joined the Special Forces at the behest of his Russian contacts and became a Captain.

In December 2005, he was honorably discharged.

He served in the United States Army's inactive reserve from 2005 until 2010.

Peter Debbins was an instructor with IWP's Cyber Intelligence Initiative.

== Foreign recruitment ==
Debbins was first approached by Russian officers in December 1996. During this encounter, he told the officers that he was a "son of Russia." In 1997, shortly after his college graduation, Debbins once again returned to Russia, where he was given the code name "Ikar Lesnikov". In one meeting in 2003, Debbins accepted a bottle of Cognac and a Russian military uniform as payment. In 2008, Debbins relayed his classified activities in the Special Forces to Russian agents and offered his former Special Forces colleagues' names for potential recruitment. Up until at least 2011, Debbins would periodically visit Russia in order to meet with Russian intelligence officers. In 2012, the GRU contacted his father-in-law, a Colonel in the Russian Air Force, about the affair.

In 2004, Debbins' security clearance was suspended after an unspecified incident in Azerbaijan. Debbins then entered the private sector as a consultant on Azerbaijan in 2005. In 2013 Debbins founded a company called Horizon Leadership Group (HLG). HLG pitched a plan to build a training center in Armenia which never came to fruition. The US state department gave the standard denial in response to questions about the existence of this program. Debbins gave several lectures at the Institute for World Politics in 2016, specifically pertaining to Russia's relationship with Armenia and the potential for conflict in the region. Debbins' activities in the Lesser Caucasus were his primary contribution to Russian Intelligence though this detail was less publicized after his arrest.

== Arrest and legal proceedings ==
Debbins was arrested on August 21, 2020 at his home in Gainesville, Virginia.

On November 18, 2020, Debbins pleaded guilty in federal court in Alexandria, Virginia to one count of conspiracy to commit espionage, which carries a penalty of up to life in prison.

In May 2021, U.S. District Judge Claude Hilton sentenced Debbins to 188 months in federal prison. Debbins is currently incarcerated at ADX Florence, the federal supermax in Florence, Colorado. According to the Federal Bureau of Prisons he is scheduled for release on December 28, 2033.
