= Kathleen Cordelia Bailey =

American political scientist and artist

Kathleen Bailey

Personal details
- Born: Kathleen Cordelia Bailey; January 5, 1949 (age 77) Dallas, Texas, U.S.
- Party: Democratic
- Spouse(s): Aman Amiri (m. 1974; div. 1981) Robert Barker (m. 1983)
- Education: University of Illinois, Urbana-Champaign (BA, MA, PhD)

Kathleen Cordelia Bailey (born January 5, 1949) is an American political scientist and artist. She served as deputy assistant secretary of the Bureau of Intelligence and Research and as assistant director of the Arms Control and Disarmament Agency. She is a senior associate at the National Institute for Public Policy in Washington, D.C.

== Early life and education ==
Bailey was born in Dallas and attended high school in Pana, Illinois. She earned a Bachelor of Arts degree in Asian history (1971), Master of Arts in political science (1972), and a PhD in political science (1976) from the University of Illinois Urbana–Champaign. Her doctoral thesis was a systems analysis of the National Iranian Oil Company, written after a year's research in Tehran.

== Career ==
=== Government ===
In 1976, Bailey was the first social scientist ever hired by Lawrence Livermore National Laboratory (LLNL) and was a founding member of the proliferation intelligence analysis program, which she directed from 1978 to 1981. She specialized in analyses of foreign nuclear weapons programs. She undertook a controversial effort (ultimately squelched) to publicize a conclusion she had reached during her research in Tehran: that Iran was ripe for revolution and that it was likely to be led by the Islamic clergy.

In 1981, she resigned from LLNL and founded a consultancy, International Ventures Consultants, which provided political and economic analyses on Africa to multinational companies. She produced a bi-weekly publication, Insight Africa, from 1981 to 1983.

In 1983, she accepted a political appointment from the Reagan Administration as deputy director for the Bureau for Research in the United States Information Agency, with responsibilities for foreign public opinion polling and analysis. She was acting director from late-1983 to 1985. She initiated a program to highlight key reporting from leading foreign newspapers.

From 1985 to 1987, she served as deputy assistant secretary in the Bureau of Intelligence and Research in the U.S. Department of State, where she headed the Office of Disinformation, Analysis, and Response, was responsible for long-range assessments, was INR liaison with the House and Senate Intelligence Committees, and chaired the Interagency Active Measures Working Group. In the latter capacity, she revived the moribund group and edited/co-authored Active Measures: A Report on the Substance and Process of Anti-US Disinformation and Propaganda Campaigns, (US Department of State, 1986), and Soviet Influence Activities: A Report on Active Measures and Propaganda, 1986-87, (US Department of State, 1987), the latter of which revealed the Soviet role behind the accusation that the US was responsible for creating the AIDS virus as a weapon.

In 1987, she was confirmed by the United States Senate as assistant director of the Arms Control and Disarmament Agency, responsible for nuclear, chemical, biological, and missile nonproliferation policies. She initiated efforts to expand arms control dialog with China, including a bilateral meeting held in Beijing. She led the U.S. delegation to Preparatory Committee meetings for the 1990 Review Conference for the Treaty on the Non-Proliferation of Nuclear Weapons. She tried unsuccessfully internationalize the Intermediate Nuclear Forces Treaty, and to undertake initiatives to address Iran's budding nuclear weapons program. Following the election of President George H. W. Bush, she left the Arms Control Agency.

In 1990, she taught international relations for a semester at George Mason University, where she wrote Doomsday Weapons in the Hands of Many (University of Illinois Press, 1991). Thereafter, she became a senior analyst at the National Institute for Public Policy, where she headed two major projects: one to assess the verifiability of the Chemical Weapons Convention; the other, to examine the implications of U.S. nuclear forces moving from a triad to a dyad.

In 1992, she left Washington, D.C. to return to Lawrence Livermore National Laboratory to serve on the director's staff and was founding editor of the Director’s Series on Proliferation. She regularly testified before the United States Congress on arms control issues, including the Chemical Weapons Convention and the Comprehensive Nuclear-Test-Ban Treaty. She was a guest lecturer at the NATO Defense College as well as at universities throughout the United States.

In 1997, Bailey spoke publicly against ratification of the Comprehensive Test Ban Treaty. C. Bruce Tarter, then LLNL Director, ordered her to refrain from all public discussion of that treaty and other policy issues. Citing freedom of expression guidelines of the University of California (LLNL's institutional oversight body), she testified on her views before Congress and, at the request of Senator Jon Kyl (AZ), briefed several senators on the problems with the CTBT. Following retaliation measures against her at the Laboratory, Bailey retired from LLNL in 1999.

She served on Secretary of State Condoleezza Rice’s Arms Control and Nonproliferation Advisory Board (2006–2008).

=== Art ===
Beginning in 1999, Bailey became a full-time artist, a profession for which she goes by her middle name, Cordelia. Although she is an oil-on-canvas painter, she is best known for her fine-art photography, which has been exhibited in galleries throughout the United States and is held in private collections. She authored and produced a feature-length film, Revenge in Kind, released in 2017.

=== 2022 congressional election ===
In August 2021, Bailey announced her candidacy for Texas's 5th congressional district in the 2022 election. Bailey is a member of the Democratic Party.

== Personal life ==
Bailey married Aman F. Amiri in 1974. They were divorced in 1981. Bailey married Robert B. Barker in 1983. She has no children.

== Published works ==
=== Books ===
- Kathleen C. Bailey (1991). Doomsday Weapons in the Hands of Many: The Arms Control Challenge of the 90s. University of Illinois Press. ISBN 0252018265.
- Kathleen C. Bailey & Robert Rudney (eds.) (1992). Proliferation and Export Controls. University Press of America. ISBN 0819187194.
- Kathleen C. Bailey (1993). Strengthening Nuclear Nonproliferation. Westview Press. ISBN 9780813320069.
- Kathleen C. Bailey (ed.) (1994). Weapons of Mass Destruction: Costs Versus Benefits. Manohar Publishers. ISBN 0964783304.
- Kathleen C. Bailey (1995). The UN Inspections in Iraq: Lessons for On-Site Verification. Westview Press. ISBN 0813389259.
- Cordelia Bailey (2016). Cordelia Bailey Photography. Fresco Books. ISBN 1934491500.
- K.C. Bailey (1995). Death For Cause. Meerkat Publications ISBN 9780964493506.
- K.C. Bailey (2015). Revenge In Kind: A Novella. Meerkat Publications ISBN 9780964493537.
- K.C. Bailey (2020). Filming An Indie. Meerkat Publications. ISBN 9780964493551.
- K.C. Bailey (2023). Moments: Short Stories. Meerkat Publications. ISBN 9780964493582.

=== Monographs ===
- K.C. Bailey and F.D. Barish (1998). De-Alerting of US Nuclear Forces: A Critical Appraisal. Lawrence Livermore National Laboratory. UCRL-LR-132030.
- Kathleen C. Bailey (1999). The Comprehensive Test Ban Treaty: The Costs Outweigh The Benefits. CATO Institute.
- Kathleen C. Bailey (2001). The Comprehensive Test Ban Treaty: An Update on the Debate. National Institute for Public Policy.
- Kathleen C. Bailey (2001). The Biological and Toxin Weapons Threat to the United States. National Institute for Public Policy.
- Kathleen C. Bailey (2002). Why the United States Rejected the Protocol to the Biological and Toxin Weapons Convention. National Institute for Public Policy.
- Kathleen C. Bailey and Thomas Scheber (2011). The Comprehensive Test Ban Treaty: An Assessment of the Benefits, Costs, and Risks. National Institute for Public Policy.
- Kathleen C. Bailey (2022). China's Quest for a New International Order and Its Use of Public Diplomacy as a Means.
