= Public diplomacy =

Public relations as a form of diplomacy

In international relations, public diplomacy broadly speaking, is any of the various government-sponsored efforts aimed at communicating directly with foreign publics to establish a dialogue designed to inform and influence with the aim of building support for the state's strategic objectives. These also include propaganda. As the international order has changed over the twentieth century, so has the practice of public diplomacy. Its practitioners use a variety of instruments and methods ranging from personal contact and media interviews to the internet and educational exchanges.

== Background and definitions ==
Over time, the concept and definition of public diplomacy has evolved, as demonstrated by the following statements from various practitioners:

The most important roles public diplomacy will have to play for the United States in the current international environment will be less grand-strategic and more operational than during the Cold War. Support of national policy in military contingencies is one such role, and probably the most important.

– Carnes Lord (former deputy director of USIA), professor of statecraft and civilization, October 1998

Public diplomacy – effectively communicating with publics around the globe – to understand, value and even emulate America's vision and ideas; historically one of America's most effective weapons of outreach, persuasion and policy.

– Jill A. Schuker (former senior director for public affairs at the National Security Council), July 2004

Public diplomacy's 21st century trend is dominated by fractal globalization, preemptive military invasion, information and communication technologies that shrink time and distance, and the rise of global non-state actors (terror networks, bloggers) that challenge state-driven policy and discourse on the subject.
– Nancy Snow, Routledge Handbook of Public Diplomacy,

Public diplomacy may be defined, simply, as the conduct of international relations by governments through public communications media and through dealings with a wide range of nongovernmental entities (political parties, corporations, trade associations, labor unions, educational institutions, religious organizations, ethnic groups, and so on including influential individuals) for the purpose of influencing the politics and actions of other governments.
– Alan K. Henrikson, Professor of Diplomatic History, April 2005.

Public diplomacy that traditionally represents actions of governments to influence overseas publics within the foreign policy process has expanded today—by accident and design—beyond the realm of governments to include the media, multinational corporations, NGO's and faith-based organizations as active participants in the field.
– Crocker Snow Jr., Acting Director Edward R. Murrow Center, May 2005.

Public diplomacy refers to government-sponsored programs intended to inform or influence public opinion in other countries; its chief instruments are publications, motion pictures, cultural exchanges, radio and television. – U.S. Department of State, Dictionary of International Relations Terms, 1987, p. 85

The United States Information Agency (USIA), which was the main government agency in charge of public diplomacy until it merged with the Department of State in 1999, described it as "seek[ing] to promote the national interest and the national security of the United States through understanding, informing, and influencing foreign publics and broadening dialogue between American citizens and institutions and their counterparts abroad." For the Planning Group for Integration of USIA into the Department of State (June 20, 1997), public diplomacy meant "seek[ing] to promote the national interest of the United States through understanding, informing and influencing foreign audiences." According to Hans N. Tuch, author of Communicating With the World (St. Martin's Press, NY, 1990), public diplomacy is "official government efforts to shape the communications environment overseas in which American foreign policy is played out, in order to reduce the degree to which misperceptions and misunderstandings complicate relations between the U.S. and other nations."

Standard diplomacy might be described as the ways in which government leaders communicate with each other at the highest levels, the elite diplomacy we are all familiar with. Public diplomacy, by contrast focuses on the ways in which a country (or multilateral organization such as the United Nations) communicates with citizens in other societies. A country may be acting deliberately or inadvertently, and through both official and private individuals and institutions. Effective public diplomacy starts from the premise that dialogue, rather than a sales pitch, is often central to achieving the goals of foreign policy: public diplomacy must be seen as a two-way street. Furthermore, public diplomacy activities often present many differing views as represented by private American individuals and organizations in addition to official U.S. government views.

Traditional diplomacy actively engages one government with another government. In traditional diplomacy, U.S. Embassy officials represent the U.S. government in a host country primarily by maintaining relations and conducting official business with the officials of the host government whereas public diplomacy primarily engages many diverse non-government elements of a society.

Film, television, music, sports, video games and other social/cultural activities are seen by public diplomacy advocates as enormously important avenues for otherwise diverse citizens to understand each other and integral to the international cultural understanding, which they state is a key goal of modern public diplomacy strategy. In the digital and social media era, public diplomacy is increasingly seen as communication between non-state actors or publics rather than solely between state actors, and is progressively situated within the realm of international communication. It involves not only shaping the message(s) that a country wishes to present abroad, but also analyzing and understanding the ways that the message is interpreted by diverse societies and developing the tools of listening and conversation as well as the tools of persuasion.In the online communication environment, public narratives often hold greater significance than the actions of state actors in promoting the country.

One of the most successful initiatives which embodies the principles of effective public diplomacy is the creation by international treaty in the 1950s of the European Coal and Steel Community which later became the European Union. Its original purpose after World War II was to tie the economies of Europe together so much that war would be impossible. Supporters of European integration see it as having achieved both this goal and the extra benefit of catalysing greater international understanding as European countries did more business together and the ties among member states' citizens increased. Opponents of European integration are leery of a loss of national sovereignty and greater centralization of power.

Public diplomacy has been an essential element of American foreign policy for decades. It was an important tool in influencing public opinion during the Cold War with the former Soviet Union. Since the attacks of September 11, 2001, the term has come back into vogue as the United States government works to improve their reputation abroad, particularly in the Middle East and among those in the Islamic world. Numerous panels, including those sponsored by the Council on Foreign Relations, have evaluated American efforts in public diplomacy since 9/11 and have written reports recommending that the United States take various actions to improve the effectiveness of their public diplomacy.

The United States Advisory Commission on Public Diplomacy was established in the late 1940s to evaluate American public diplomacy effort. The commission is a seven-member bipartisan board whose members are nominated by the President and confirmed by the United States Senate. As of 2025, Sim Farar serves as chair and William J. Hybl as vice chair., and other members include former Ambassadors Lyndon Olson and Penne Percy Korth Peacock, as well as Jay Snyder, John E. Osborn and Lezlee Westine.

This traditional concept is expanded on with the idea of adopting what is called "population-centric foreign affairs" within which foreign populations assume a central component of foreign policy. Since people, not just states, are of global importance in a world where technology and migration increasingly face everyone, an entire new door of policy is opened.

=== People's Republic of China ===
Soon after the 1949 founding of the People's Republic of China, the Chinese Communist Party institutionalized its view of public diplomacy as "people's diplomacy" (renmin waijiao). People's diplomacy was expressed through the slogan, "influence the policy through the people." Pursuant to its people's diplomacy, China sent doctors, scientists, and athletes to developing countries in Asia to cultivate ties. This form of people's diplomacy was often executed through the Chinese Communist Party's International Liaison Department.

At its inception, the PRC viewed translating Chinese works as an important part of its cultural diplomacy. During the Mao era, the government emphasized distributing foreign language works such as China Pictorial, China Reconstructs, and Peking Review.

People's diplomacy with the capitalist countries sought to cultivate informal, non-state ties in the hope of developing "foreign friends" who would lobby their governments to improve relations with China. In the context of China-United States relations, one of the most prominent instances of people's diplomacy was the ping-pong diplomacy which arose following a conversation between Chinese and American players at the 1971 World Championships in Nagoya, Japan. China's approach to keeping these exchanges unofficial and conduct them through non-governmental agencies was generally well-received by U.S. civil society groups and academics.

Sister city initiatives are an increasingly widespread mechanism for Chinese public diplomacy. From the early 2000s until 2024, the number of China's sister city relationships doubled. More than one-third of Chinese sister city relationships are with sister cities in the east Asia Pacific region.

The People's Daily has described Confucius Institutes as a form of public diplomacy.

==== International communication centers ====
International communication centers (ICC, Chinese: 国际传播中心) are state media institutions established by provinces and cities of the People's Republic of China. They operate under the supervision of the Central Propaganda Department of the Chinese Communist Party, with state media outlets such as China Daily, Xinhua News Agency, and China News Service providing infrastructure and serving as a partner to many. The first ICCs were established in 2018 in response to General Secretary of the Chinese Communist Party Xi Jinping's call to "innovate" foreign-directed propaganda. According to Qiushi, the theoretical journal of the Chinese Communist Party (CCP), ICCs are "developed based on local propaganda needs" and aim to be a "new force" in the party's global propaganda ecosystem.

=== Republic of China ===
During the 1970s, the Kuomintang during the tenure of Executive Yuan Premier Chiang Ching-kuo organized a people's diplomacy campaign in the United States in an effort to mobilize American political sentiment in opposition to the PRC through mass demonstrations and petitions. Among these efforts, the KMT worked with the John Birch Society to launch a petition writing campaign through which Americans were urged to write their local government officials and ask them to "Cut the Red China connection."

== Methods ==
There are many methods and instruments that are used in public diplomacy.

International broadcasting remains a key element in public diplomacy in the 21st century, with traditionally weaker states having the opportunity to challenge the hegemony and monopoly of information provided by more powerful states.

Methods such as personal contact, broadcasters such as the Voice of America, Radio Free Europe and Radio Liberty exchange programs such as Fulbright and the International Visitor Leadership Program, American arts and performances in foreign countries, and the use of the Internet are all instruments used for practicing public diplomacy depending on the audience to be communicated with and the message to be conveyed.

== Impact ==
According to a 2021 study, high-level visits by leaders increases public approval among foreign citizens.

== See also ==
- British Council – Organisation promoting cultural and linguistic knowledge of the United Kingdom
- Citizen diplomacy – Issues of diplomacy
- Cultural diplomacy – Exchange of culture between nations
- Digital diplomacy – Use of digital tools for diplomatic engagement
- Diplomatic capital
- Goethe-Institut – Nonprofit German cultural organization
- Music and political warfare – Technique of delivering political messages
- Office of Public Diplomacy
- Political warfare – Use of political means to compel an opponent with hostile intent
- Public diplomacy of the United States
- Public diplomacy of Israel – Public relations work by the State of Israel
- Public diplomacy in the Islamic Republic of Iran
- Public diplomacy of South Korea
- Otto Reich – American diplomat and lobbyist
- Smith–Mundt Act – Law regulating State Department broadcasting
- Strategic communication – Style of organizational communication
- Soft power – Ability to co-opt rather than coerce
- USC Center on Public Diplomacy – University of Southern California diplomacy program
- United States Information Agency – Former government agency
- White propaganda – Propaganda that does not hide its origin or nature
