= Summer Wheat =

American artist

Summer Wheat is a contemporary American artist born in 1977 in Oklahoma City. She currently lives in Queens, NY and works in Brooklyn, NY.

Since 2002, Wheat has had numerous solo and group exhibitions in galleries and museums throughout the U.S. and internationally. In 2010, Wheat was awarded a year-long residency with Triangle Arts Association in Brooklyn, NY. In 2016 she created a site-specific, large-scale installation for Oklahoma Contemporary Arts Center. In 2017, Wheat was named as one of "10 Artists to Watch at Frieze London". In 2016, she was presented as recipient of the 2016 New York NADA Artadia Award, which is presented every year to one artist that is exhibiting at NADA New York.

Wheat developed a painting technique whereby she pushes acrylic paint through framed pieces of aluminum mesh; this technique was described by The Art in America journal as "completely novel". Her 2018 exhibition at the Andrew Edlin Gallery in NY was chosen by Artforum as a Critics' Pick.

== Education ==
Wheat received a BA from University of Central Oklahoma in 2000, and an MFA from Savannah College of Art and Design in 2005.
