= Institute of World Politics =

Graduate school in Washington, DC, US

The Institute of World Politics
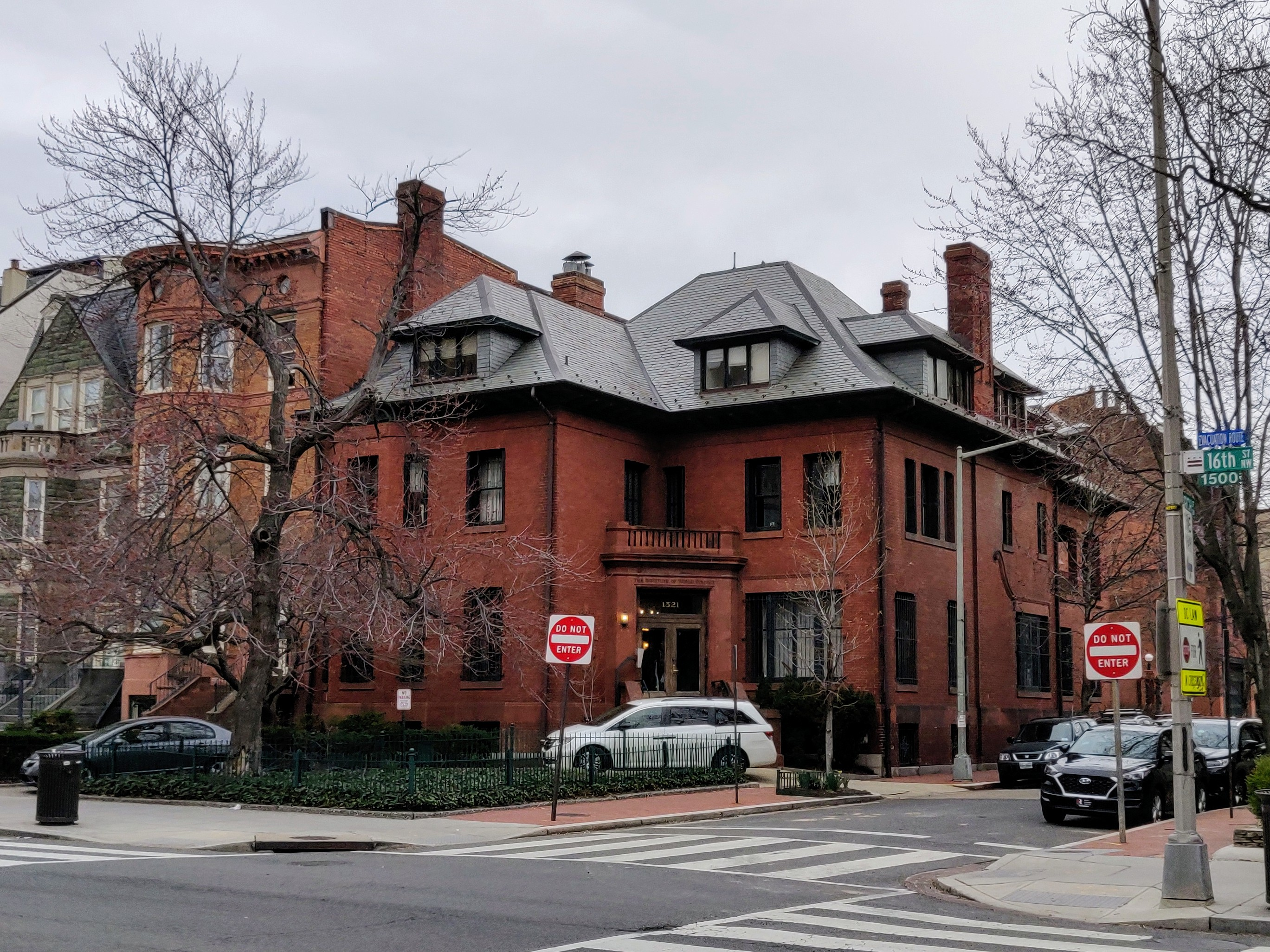
- Type: Private graduate school
- Established: 1990
- Founder: John Lenczowski
- President: Aldona Wos
- Location: Washington, DC, United States; 38.9105°N 77.0362°W
- Campus: Urban
- Language: English
- Website: www.iwp.edu

The Institute of World Politics (IWP) is a private graduate school of security, intelligence, and international affairs in Washington, D.C. Founded in 1990, the school offers courses related to intelligence, national security, and diplomatic communities.

== History ==
The Institute of World Politics (IWP) was founded in 1990 by John Lenczowski, the former director of European and Soviet Affairs at the United States National Security Council during the Reagan administration. His stated purpose for establishing the Institute was to develop a graduate school and curriculum that teaches students to apply "all the instruments of statecraft" across the spectrum of conflict but to remain grounded in American founding principles and the rule of international law.

From 1991 to 2005, it maintained an affiliation with Boston University. This affiliation ended in 2006, as IWP attained independent accreditation by the Middle States Commission on Higher Education. IWP is licensed to operate in Washington, D.C. by the DC Higher Education Licensure Commission.

In 2008, IWP became one of 17 academic institutions qualified by the US Army to host Senior Service Fellows.

IWP has awarded an Honorary Doctorate of Laws to then-U.S. Secretary of Defense James Mattis, Dr. Hadley Arkes, General Michael Hayden, Victor Davis Hansen, General Raymond Odierno, Robert McFarlane, Robert P. George, Lady Blanka Rosenstiel, Chen Guangcheng, and LTG Michael Flynn.

== Academics ==
The Institute of World Politics is accredited by the Middle States Commission on Higher Education. The institute provides a Ph.D. program in Statecraft and Strategy, a professional Doctor of Statecraft and Strategy program, a professional Doctor of Statecraft and National Security program, 13 master's degree programs, and 15 graduate certificates. It houses the Kosciuszko Chair of Polish Studies, the Center for Culture and Security, and the Center for Energy Security and Diplomacy.

=== Doctor of Statecraft and National Security ===
The Doctor of Statecraft and National Security (Professional) (DSNS) is a degree targeted toward those who wish to pursue national security careers, as opposed to teaching. In contrast to most Ph.D. programs, it avoids specialization in favor of broad understanding.

== Students ==
The 150-member student body is approximately 65% recent graduates planning to pursue careers in national security, foreign policy, or intelligence and about 35% mid-career professionals in those fields seeking additional credentials. Holding a security clearance is not a prerequisite for studying at IWP, as all coursework takes place at an unclassified level.

== Campus ==
The Institute of World Politics is located in the Dupont Circle neighborhood of Washington, D.C. Its campus consists of two buildings, the Marlatt Mansion and Bently Hall, both of which contain classrooms and administrative offices. Both building are designated contributing properties to the Sixteenth Street Historic District. Bently Hall at the Institute is named for Donald E. Bently, a longtime Institute Board member and major financial supporter of the Institute.

The Institute holds the private library of former CIA Director William Casey and the American Security Council Foundation Library.

== Funding ==
Donald E. Bently purchased the Marlatt Mansion and two adjacent townhouses for the Institute. For the first 15 years, he rented the building to the Institute for $1.00 per year. He paid several million dollars to renovate the townhouses and later donated them to the Institute. He also endowed the Donald E. Bently Chair of Political Economy.

The institute is a 501(c)(3) non-profit, tax-exempt educational institution, relying on private charitable donations and tuition. Tuition accounts for approximately 65% of annual operating expenses.

== Notable people ==
=== Alumni ===
- Brian Mennes, United States Army general officer
- Mohammad Shafiq Hamdam, social activist, writer, political analyst and former senior media and public diplomacy advisor at NATO
- Eerik Marmei, former ambassador of Estonia to the U.S.
- Mark Tooley, president of the Institute on Religion and Democracy
- Zak Allal, a medical doctor for the United Nations in Algeria and non-resident scholar at IWP
- Peter Debbins taught not-for-credit cyber classes at IWP and was later convicted of spying for Russia

=== Faculty ===
- Ilan Berman, American lawyer and policy analyst
- Marek Jan Chodakiewicz, Director of the Center for Intermarium Studies
- David Hale, American diplomat and ambassador
- Christopher C. Harmon
- John Lenczowski, former director of European and Soviet Affairs, National Security Council
- G. Philip Hughes, former official with the White House and Departments of State, Commerce and Defense
- Joshua Muravchik, writer and specialist on U.S. foreign policy
- Albert Santoli, Founder and Director of Asia America Initiative

=== Former faculty ===
- Matthew Daniels, founder of Good of All
- Kenneth deGraffenreid,
- Paul A. Goble, former special advisor to the Secretary of State
- Sebastian Gorka
- Mackubin Thomas Owens
- Alberto Martinez Piedra
- Michael Pillsbury, senior fellow and director for Chinese strategy at Hudson Institute
- Juliana Geran Pilon
- S. Eugene Poteat,
- Richard W. Rahn
- Herbert Romerstein
- Henry D. Sokolski, executive director of the Nonproliferation Policy Education Center

== See also ==
- List of diplomatic training institutions
