= Grey Goose (vodka) =

Premium vodka brand

- Type: Vodka
- Manufacturer: Bacardi
- Origin: France
- Introduced: 1997
- Alcohol by volume: 40%
- Proof (US): 80 proof
- Variants: L'Orange, Le Citron, La Poire, Cherry Noir, Le Melon
- Related products: List of vodkas
- Website: greygoose.com

Grey Goose (French pronunciation: [ɡʁe ɡus]) is a brand of vodka produced in France. It was created in the 1990s by American businessman and philanthropist Sidney Frank, who sold it to the multinational company Bacardi in 2004. The Maître de Chai for Grey Goose is François Thibault, who developed the original recipe for the vodka in Cognac.

== Creation and company history ==
“I remember there was always something in the name that had magic with the consumer[...]"

"People are always looking for something new."

— Sidney Frank on his vodka

Grey Goose was created by Sidney Frank Importing Co (SFIC). Sidney Frank, founder/CEO of the company, developed the idea in the summer of 1997. SFIC partnered with cognac producer François Thibault in France to transition his skills from cognac to vodka production, of which Frank directed his team to "come back with a vodka."

The company selected France due to the country's culinary history and sophisticated prestige, as well as to differentiate itself from other vodkas produced in Eastern Europe. The company also developed its distinctive smoked glass bottle, featuring French geese in flight, and delivered its product in wooden crates to evoke a presentation that was similar to wine. Likewise, the tall and crystal-clear bottles would be prominent and displayed as such at bars. In 1998, the Beverage Testing Institute reviewed Grey Goose Vodka, and the brand received a score of 96 out of 100. In 2001, Grey Goose released its first flavor, L'Orange, followed by Le Citron in 2002.

The company was eventually sold by Sidney Frank to Bacardi for a reported US$2.2 billion in 2004. Grey Goose was the best-selling premium brand vodka in the United States, selling more than 1.5 million cases that year.

In 2018, Grey Goose partnered with entertainer Jamie Foxx for a nine-part online series called Off Script. It is the official vodka of the US Open tennis tournament, and is the key ingredient in the "honey deuce," the signature drink of the tournament.

== Product description ==
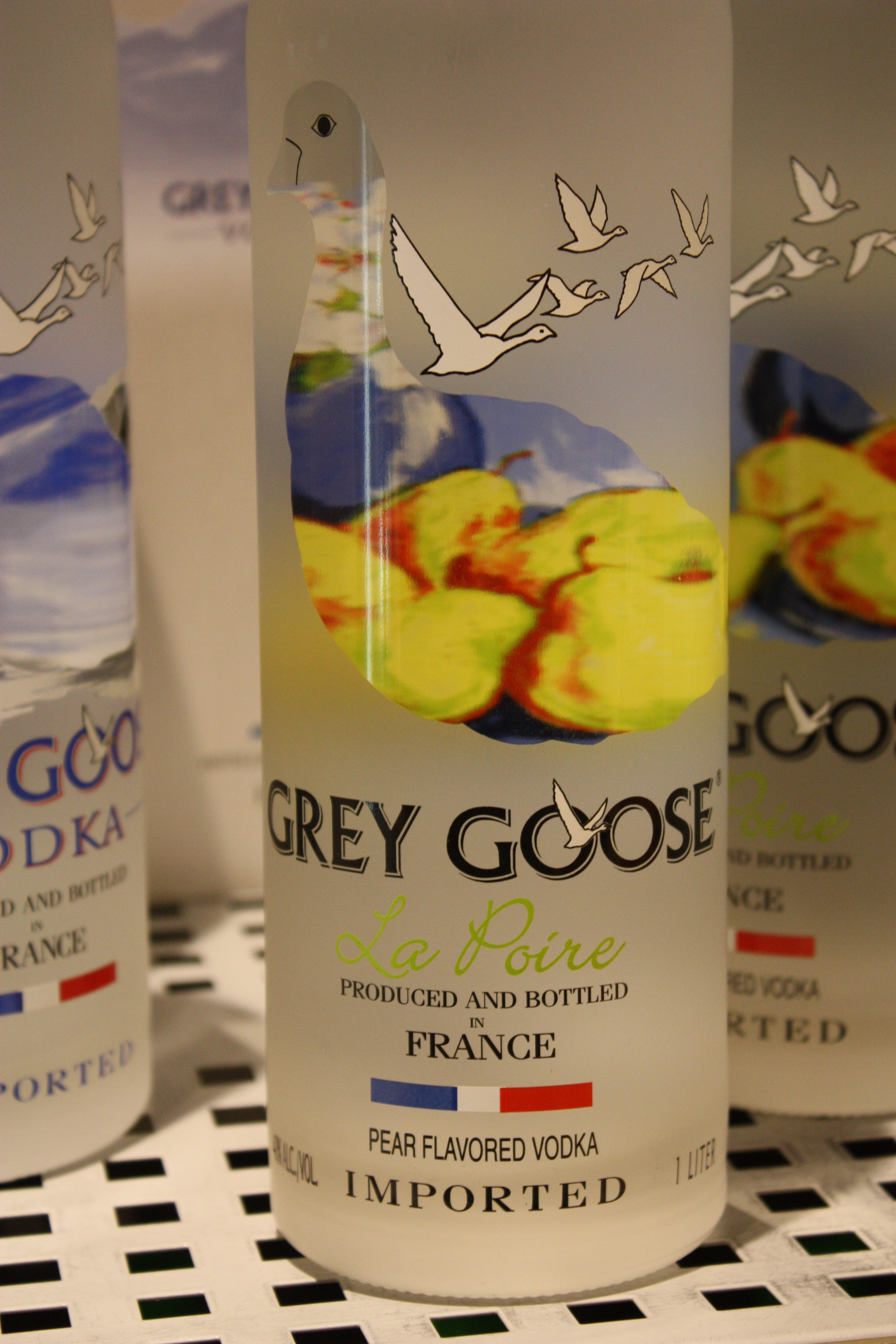
A bottle of Grey Goose vodka, from 2010

The wheat used in the creation of Grey Goose vodka is grown in the Picardy region of France. It is distilled in the Northeast of Paris, then sent to Cognac, France. Once received, the distillate is blended with a mix of spring and bottled water. Grey Goose uses "soft winter wheat", sown in October and harvested in August, which provides it with four additional months of growth in comparison to summer wheat.

Although Grey Goose distills its vodka from wheat, the product is overall gluten-free. The distillation process removes the gluten from the final product.

During the distilling process, Grey Goose uses enzymes to break down carbohydrates into fermentable sugars. The fermentation takes place continuously over six cascading tanks, producing a 20-proof beer. The "wash" is then distilled into spirits using a five-step process. The water used in the vodka comes from a natural spring 150 meters (500 feet) below the blending facility in Cognac, which is lined with limestone, providing calcium-rich spring water; that water is then filtered to remove impurities. After the filtration, the vodka is bottled in-plant. Grey Goose vodka is bottled with a replaceable cork rather than a screw cap.
