= Music and political warfare =

Technique of delivering political messages

Music and political warfare have been used together in many different political contexts and cultures as a way to reach a targeted audience in order to deliver a specific political message. Political warfare, as defined by Paul A. Smith, is the "use of political means to compel an opponent to do one's will... commonly through the use of words, images and ideas." Music is useful because it creates an easily recognizable and memorable method of delivery for the desired message. Music is a particularly useful medium for the delivery of propaganda. Jacques Ellul stated that for propaganda to be effective, it must "fill the citizen's whole day and every day". Since music is often viewed as a leisure activity, it is often not considered to be as threatening as other propaganda techniques, and as a result messages can often be surreptitiously communicated without being conspicuously noticed.

== American Revolution ==
During the American Revolution, songs and poems were a very popular form of satire and also served as a medium for sharing the news and gossip of the day. As a result, many of the battles and skirmishes between the Americans and the British were retold and celebrated in the form of songs. Samuel Adams utilized music and protest songs in the mass public demonstrations he organized to protest British practices towards the American colonists

After a humiliating retreat for the British-during which time the Americans engaged in the "ungentlemanly" act of firing at the backs of their retreating enemy – the British were immortalized in song:

How brave you went out with muskets all bright,
And thought to be-frighten the folks with the sight;
But when you got there how they powder’d your pums,
And all the way home how they pepper’d your bums,
And is it not, honies, a comical farce,
To be proud in the face, and be shot in the arse.

Perhaps the most well known song to emerge during this time was Yankee Doodle. Originally conceived by the British in an attempt to mock and demoralize the ragged American troops, it was instead adopted by the Americans as a rallying anthem. In the language of the day, "doodle" referred to a fool or simpleton while "dandy" meant a gentleman of highly exaggerated dress and manners. Finally the term "macaroni" was a type of dress popular in Italy and widely imitated in England at the time. The song mocked the American's ragged and rough style of dress in comparison to the British armies distinct formal "red coat" uniform and portrayed the Americans as backwards and ignorant, a portrayal the Americans openly accepted. Thus instead of demoralizing the Americans, Yankee Doodle instead had the opposite effect of demoralizing the British who were later defeated by this army of "backwards and ignorant" individuals.

== Nazi Germany ==
One group who understood the role that music played in spreading their political message was the Nazis in Hitler's Germany. Clearly understanding the link between music and political warfare, propaganda minister Josef Goebbels once stated:

"Music affects the heart and emotions more than the intellect. Where then could the heart of a nation beat stronger than in the huge masses, in which the heart of a nation has found its true home?"

Hitler made use of music glorifying Germanic legends, such as the works of Richard Wagner. Wagner's operas employed imagery of knights which Hitler then co-opted for images of himself

Music was used within the Hitler Youth organization as a way to indoctrinate the youth of Germany into the Nazi's ideology. As part of their activities, group singing was a way to educate the young members of the group. According to an internal memo, songs were seen as "possess[ing] the strongest community building power".

== Communism ==
Communist states such as the USSR and China have also utilized music as a way to spread their message of global communism. The Soviet Union sought to control the negative influences of music on the people and attempted to shape the messages being used in music to strengthen the Soviet regime. Throughout Communist rule, the state sought to create legislation that in effect controlled the creative output of musicians and composers by limiting musical education, controlling which musicians could be employed and by only allowing "approved" musical performances-in short ensuring that music was within keeping with Communist principles and ideology. Songs were often used in the revolutionary period because they could be easily shaped to have explicit and revolutionary messages set to a simple melody.

In the People's Republic of China, Chairman Mao Zedong believed that it was essential to employ national music in order to "reeducate" the Chinese people and make them accept Communist reforms. Mao stated that

"in music you may apply appropriate foreign principles and use foreign musical instruments. But still there must be national characteristics...The arts are inseparable from the customs, feelings and even the language of the people, from the history of the nation"

In China under Mao's rule it became essential to re-educate artists and composers to turn away from traditional operas that often portrayed imperial China and espoused Buddhist and Confucian morals in their stories. As a result, the Communist Party established an academy for the arts in Yan'an in 1937 which was intended to "rectify" the people of the arts and instruct them on how to incorporate the themes and objectives of the Communist Party into their works

== Other modern uses ==
In Uzbekistan there has been an increase in television programming that seeks to convey the regime's political and ideological messages. As a way to counter growing Islamic fundamentalism, Uzbek television programming has vilified Islamists through the use of pop videos by a group called Setora, a trio dubbed the "Tashkent Spice Girls". Setora's music video tells the story of a young soldier, the boyfriend of one of three girls, who is sent away on a military assignment away from his loved one. Intertwined with this story are scenes of a mother and her children being taken captive by a highly caricatured Islamic extremist. As the video continues the soldier sweeps in to the rescue of the family, dying a hero in the process. The imagery of a mother is often used as a symbol for the state and in this case the state must be protected and preserved from the threat of Islamic extremism.

The banning of music itself can also be a method of political warfare. This was the case in Afghanistan while the Taliban held power. At the height of the insurgency in southern Somalia, the Islamist group Al-Shabaab also banned music on radio stations it controlled. Rebel outfits were seeking to establish Sharia law within the country and saw eliminating music as a way to purge society of what they deemed "evil actions".

During the Yugoslav Wars, the warring states were using traditional Balkan folk music created by their respected national artists in order to boost their soldiers' morale, as well as to justify their political and military superiority using derogatory terms for the ethnic populace, such as the words "Ustasa" for Croats, "Balija" for Bosniaks, and "Chetniks" for Serbs. They also used historical connotations related to battles within the region during the Ottoman Empire's expansion. Many of these can be found on YouTube, for example the user Kocayine uploaded videos that came from old VHS tapes and recorded broadcasting of war music that were congruently paired up with combat footage that came from the region, even to the point where one of them became an internet meme that was well received by neo-Nazis and Serb nationalists alike.

== Music and public diplomacy ==
Music has also been used as a successful tool for public diplomacy, the so-called "softer" side of political warfare. One common technique employed by the United States Information Agency (USIA), once the center of the United States' entire public diplomacy strategy, was to arrange for musical exchanges. This was often done by scheduling tours of notable American musicians to foreign countries, especially those under Communist regimes, as a way to expose the average citizen to Americans and their culture.

Another way that American music was used in public diplomacy was through radio programming on the Voice of America. Willis Conover's "Music USA" jazz programming that exposed foreign audiences to American jazz music through songs, interviews with artists and musicians as well as Conover's color commentary. "Music USA" soon became one of VOA's most popular programs.

== See also ==
- Role of music in World War II
- War of ideas
- Public diplomacy
- Political Warfare
- Passive Revolution
- Psychological Operations (United States)
- Psychological Warfare
- Socialist realism
- Heroic realism
- Anarcho-punk
- Punk ideology
- Music and politics
- Rock Against Racism
- Rock Against Communism
- National Socialist Black Metal
- Protest song
