= Schenley Industries =

American liquor company

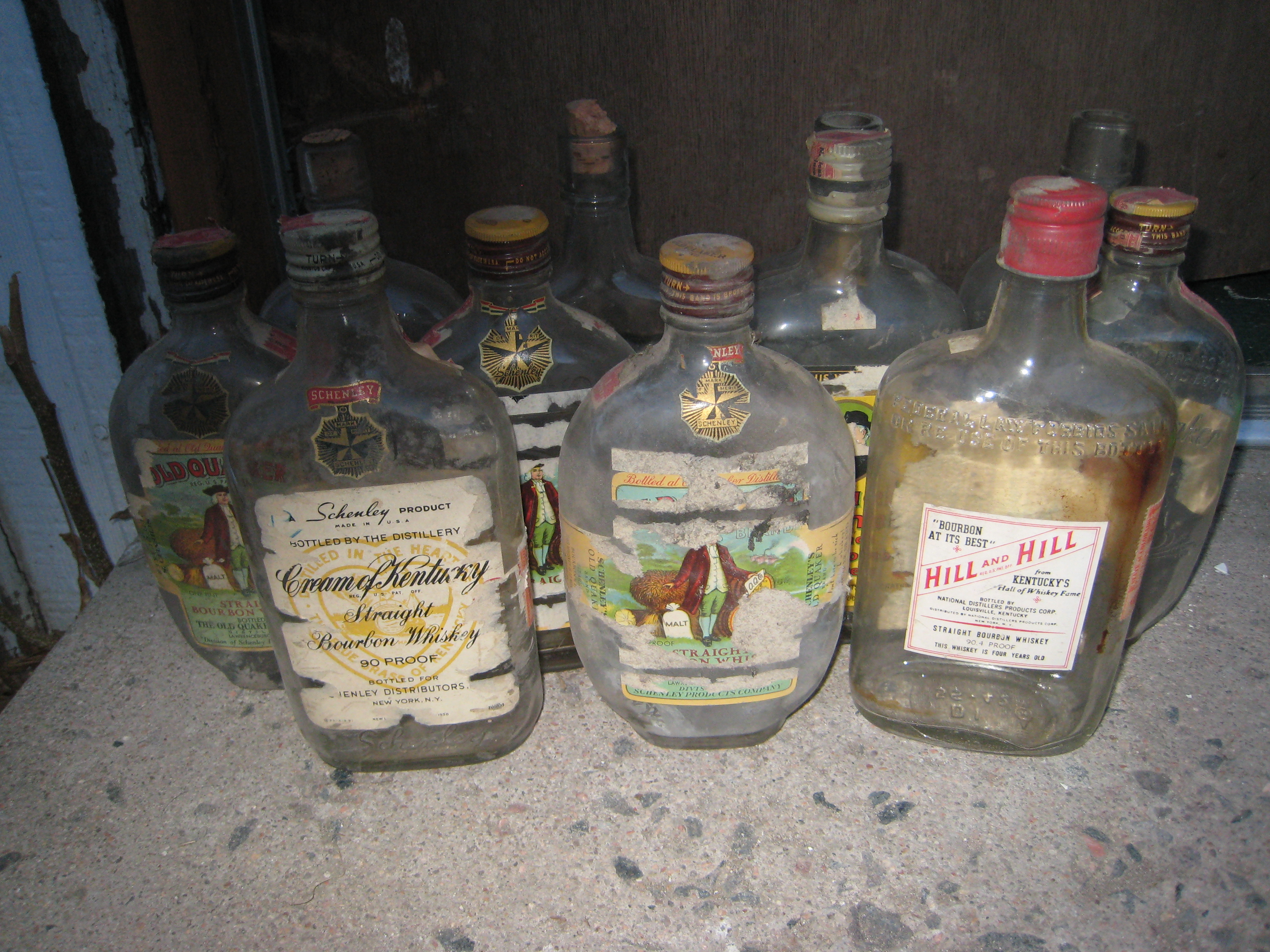
Some old Schenley bourbon whiskey bottles from the 1940s

Schenley Industries was a liquor company based in New York City with headquarters in the Empire State Building and a distillery in Lawrenceburg, Indiana. It owned several brands of Bourbon whiskey, including Schenley, The Old Quaker Company, Cream of Kentucky, Golden Wedding Rye, I.W. Harper, and James E. Pepper. Schenley Industries was also the owner of the producer of Cruzan Rum. It also owned a controlling interest in Blatz beer and made a Canadian whisky called Schenley Reserve, also called Schenley Black Label. It was the only liquor available to submarine officers at Midway in World War II, where it was held in low regard and known as "Schenley's Black Death". It also imported Dewar's White Label Scotch.

== History ==
Schenley Products Company was organized in the 1920s by Lewis Rosenstiel. The company bought numerous distillers, including one in Schenley, Pennsylvania, and acquired a license to produce medicinal whiskey. (The United States government had authorized six companies to produce medicinal spirits. The others were: Brown-Forman, Frankfort Distilleries, the A. Ph. Stitzel Distillery, the American Medicinal Spirits Company, and James Thompson and Brother.) In 1933, when Prohibition ended, Schenley Distillers Company was formed as a publicly owned company. It was the largest liquor company in the United States during 1934–1937. The name was changed to Schenley Industries in 1949. It was one of the "Big Four", which dominated liquor sales, and included Seagram, National Distillers and Hiram Walker.

Schenley was acquired by the financier Meshulam Riklis in 1968. He sold the company to Guinness in 1987. Schenley had formerly imported Guinness into the United States. The company sponsored the Schenley Award in the Canadian Football League from its establishment in 1953 until 1988. The trophy is still awarded for outstanding play, despite the fact the company stopped its sponsorship in 1988 and has not been sponsored since.
