= John Lenczowski =

John Lenczowski (born July 20, 1950) is the founder and president of The Institute of World Politics, an independent graduate school of statecraft and national security affairs in Washington, D.C.

== Professional life ==
Lenczowski was born in Hamilton, New York. From 1981 to 1983, he served in the United States Department of State as Special Advisor to then Under Secretary for Political Affairs Lawrence Eagleburger. His highest priority was strengthening Radio Free Europe/Radio Liberty, so that it could overcome Soviet jamming and rapidly disseminate news of resistance to Soviet authority. Lenczowski succeeded in getting $2.5 billion authorized to modernize Voice of America and Radio Free Europe/Radio Liberty. In 1981, he became part of the newly founded Active Measures Working Group, which aimed to counter Soviet disinformation campaigns. Lenczowski encouraged the group to take a more proactive role in countering disinformation.

From 1983 to 1987, Lenczowski was Director of European and Soviet Affairs at the United States National Security Council. In that capacity, he served as principal Soviet affairs advisor to U.S. President Ronald Reagan. He was involved in developing many of the policies that helped prompt the collapse of the Soviet empire. One such policy came from a memo Lenczowski wrote to President Reagan outlining America's strength and promoting military deterrence by better publicizing the truth and goals of communism and the Soviet Union.
