= List of imprisoned spies =

Spying for other countries or groups is in many cases illegal and punishable by law. The following is a list of individuals that have either been imprisoned for spying, or individuals that have been arrested in connection to their spying activities.

Name	Nationality	Summary	Conviction Date	Penalty
Aldrich Ames	American	Convicted of spying for the Soviet Union and Russia	1994	Life sentence (without parole)
David Sheldon Boone	American	Sold secret documents to the Soviet Union and is estimated to have received $60,000 from the KGB	February 26, 1999	24 Years and 4 Months
Marthe Cnockaert	Belgian	Convicted for spying for the United Kingdom and its allies during the First World War	November 1916	Life sentence (released 2 years later)
Clayton J. Lonetree	American	Convicted for providing classified information to the Soviet Union while stationed in Moscow as a guard at the U.S. Embassy	August 21, 1987	30-year sentence, reduced to 15, released February 1996
Alexander Fishenko	American-Russian	Convicted for illegally exporting microelectronics from the U.S.A. to Russia	July 21, 2016	10-year sentence
James Hall III	American	Signals analyst who sold eavesdropping and code secrets to East Germany and the Soviet Union from 1983 to 1988	July 20, 1989	40-year sentence
Robert Hanssen	American	Spied for Soviet and Russian intelligence services against the United States from 1979 to 2001	July 6, 2001	Life sentence (without parole)
Ana Montes	American	Convicted for conspiracy to commit espionage for the government of Cuba	October 2002	25-year prison term followed by five years probation
Harold James Nicholson	American	Twice-convicted spy for Russia's Foreign Intelligence Service	June 5, 1997	23 years 7-month sentence
Stewart Nozette	American	Convicted for attempted espionage and fraud against the United States for the government of Israel	2009	13-year sentence
Ronald Pelton	American	Spied for and sold secret documents to the Soviet Union. Was known to have a photographic memory and as such never passed any physical documents on.	1983	Life sentence (Released November 24, 2015)
Earl Edwin Pitts	American	Accused of spying for the Soviet Union and Russia, and pleaded guilty to conspiring and attempting to commit espionage	1997	27-year sentence
Jonathan Pollard	American	Convicted for espionage for passing highly sensitive classified information to Israel while working as an American civilian intelligence analyst	1987	Life sentence (Released November 20, 2015)
George Trofimoff	American	Convicted for spying for the Soviet Union during the 1970s and 1980s	September 27, 2001	Life sentence
John Anthony Walker	American	Convicted of spying for the Soviet Union from 1968 to 1985	1985	Life sentence
Brian Patrick Regan	American	Convicted of one of gathering national defense information and two counts of attempted espionage for soliciting classified information to Iraq, China, and Libya.	March 21, 2003	Life sentence
Chelsea Manning	American	Convicted of six counts of the espionage act for providing classified information to Wikileaks	July 30, 2013	35-year sentence, commuted (released May 17, 2017)
Dongfan "Greg" Chung	Chinese	Convicted of economic espionage; stole trade secrets related to the US Space Shuttle program and the Delta IV rocket and provided them to China	July 16, 2009	15-year sentence, died May 18, 2020, while incarcerated
Kendall & Gwendolyn Myers	American	Convicted of spying for Cuba across a 30-year span	November 20, 2009	Life sentence (without parole); 81 months

== See also ==
- List of people convicted of treason
