= Robert Lipka =

American spy (1946–2013)

- Born: June 16, 1945
- Died: July 5, 2013 (aged 68); Meadville, Pennsylvania
- Other names: KGB code-names: DAN (according to Vasili Mitrokhin), "Rook" (according to the Federal Bureau of Investigation)
- Occupations: former army clerk assigned to the National Security Agency and spy for the Soviet Union
- Spouse: Patricia (div.)
- Status: Released
- Criminal charge: Conspiracy to commit espionage (Violation of the Espionage Act)
- Penalty: 18 years imprisonment and a $10,000 fine

Robert Stephen Lipka (June 16, 1945 – July 5, 2013) was a former army clerk at the National Security Agency (NSA) who, in 1997, pleaded guilty to conspiracy to commit espionage and was sentenced to 18 years in prison. He was arrested more than 30 years after his betrayal, as there is no statute of limitations for espionage.

== Early career ==
Robert Lipka was assigned to the National Security Agency as an intelligence analyst in 1964, when he was a 19-year-old U.S. Army soldier. He worked in the central communications room from 1964 to 1967, where he was responsible for removing and disseminating highly classified documents throughout the agency. Despite his junior rank, Lipka held a high security clearance, and had access to a diverse array of highly classified documents.

== Espionage ==
In September 1965, Lipka presented himself to the Soviet Embassy on 16th Street, as a walk-in or volunteer spy. He announced that he was responsible for shredding highly classified documents, and over the next two years he made contact with the residency around fifty times, using a variety of skilled tradecraft.

According to his handler at the time, former KGB General Oleg Kalugin:

"the young soldier (Lipka) ... was involved in shredding and destroying NSA documents and could supply us with a wealth of material." He goes on to say that Lipka gave him "whatever he got his hands on, often having little idea what he was turning over."

Lipka compromised daily and weekly top-secret reports to the White House, information on US troop movements throughout the world, and communications among NATO allies.

During the two years Lipka supplied the KGB top-secret information, he received payment of about $27,000. Kalugin claims that Lipka used the money he received, around $500 to $1,000 per package he delivered, to finance his college education. However, Lipka regularly complained that he deserved more money, and threatened to break contact if this demand was not met. In August 1967, Lipka made good on his threat, and left the NSA at the end of his military service in order to attend Millersville University of Pennsylvania.

In order to discourage any attempts by the KGB to recontact him, Lipka sent a final message claiming that he had been a double agent for US intelligence all along. According to Vasili Mitrokhin, the KGB knew this was a lie because of the high importance of the classified documents Lipka provided. Both the residency and illegals (non diplomatic cover handlers) tried to renew contact with Lipka intermittently for at least another 11 years, though without success.

== Investigation and arrest ==
Similar to the John Anthony Walker case, Lipka's ex-wife made accusations of his treason to the FBI. Furthermore, after the defection of Vasili Mitrokhin in 1991, MI6 provided the FBI with evidence of Lipka's activities from the Mitrokhin Archive. In 1993, armed with these accusations, revelations from Kalugin's memoir, and information from a separate investigation implicating Lipka, the FBI decided to use a false flag operation to catch him. FBI agent Dimitry Droujinsky contacted Lipka, posing as a GRU officer based in Washington named "Sergei Nikitin." Lipka told Nikitin that he was still owed money, and over the course of four meetings, "Nikitin" gave Lipka $10,000.

After a lengthy investigation, Lipka admitted to having been a spy while at the NSA, and in February 1996 he was arrested at his home in Millersville, PA, and charged with handing classified documents to the Soviet Union. As there is no statute of limitations in espionage cases, it did not matter that Lipka had ceased spying for the Soviet Union three decades before his arrest.

== Guilty Plea and Sentence ==
In May 1997, Lipka accepted a plea deal to avoid trial, which could have resulted in a life sentence. In the courtroom, The Philadelphia Inquirer reported, Lipka "exploded into tears as he confessed that he had handed over classified information to KGB agents." He was sentenced in September 1997 to 18 years in prison, a $10,000 fine, and additional reimbursement to the FBI of the $10,000 given to him by "Nikitin."

== Prison and death ==
According to the Federal Bureau of Prisons, Lipka was released on December 8, 2006.

On July 5, 2013, Robert Lipka died in Meadville, PA at the age of 68.

== See also ==
- Mitrokhin Archive
- United States government security breaches
- First Chief Directorate
- National Security Agency
- Tradecraft
- James Hall III
- Robert Hanssen
- Earl Edwin Pitts
- Harold James Nicholson
- George Trofimoff
