= United States government security breaches =

This page is a timeline of published security lapses in the United States government. These lapses are frequently referenced in congressional and non-governmental oversight. This article does not attempt to capture security vulnerabilities.

== Timeline ==
=== 1940s ===
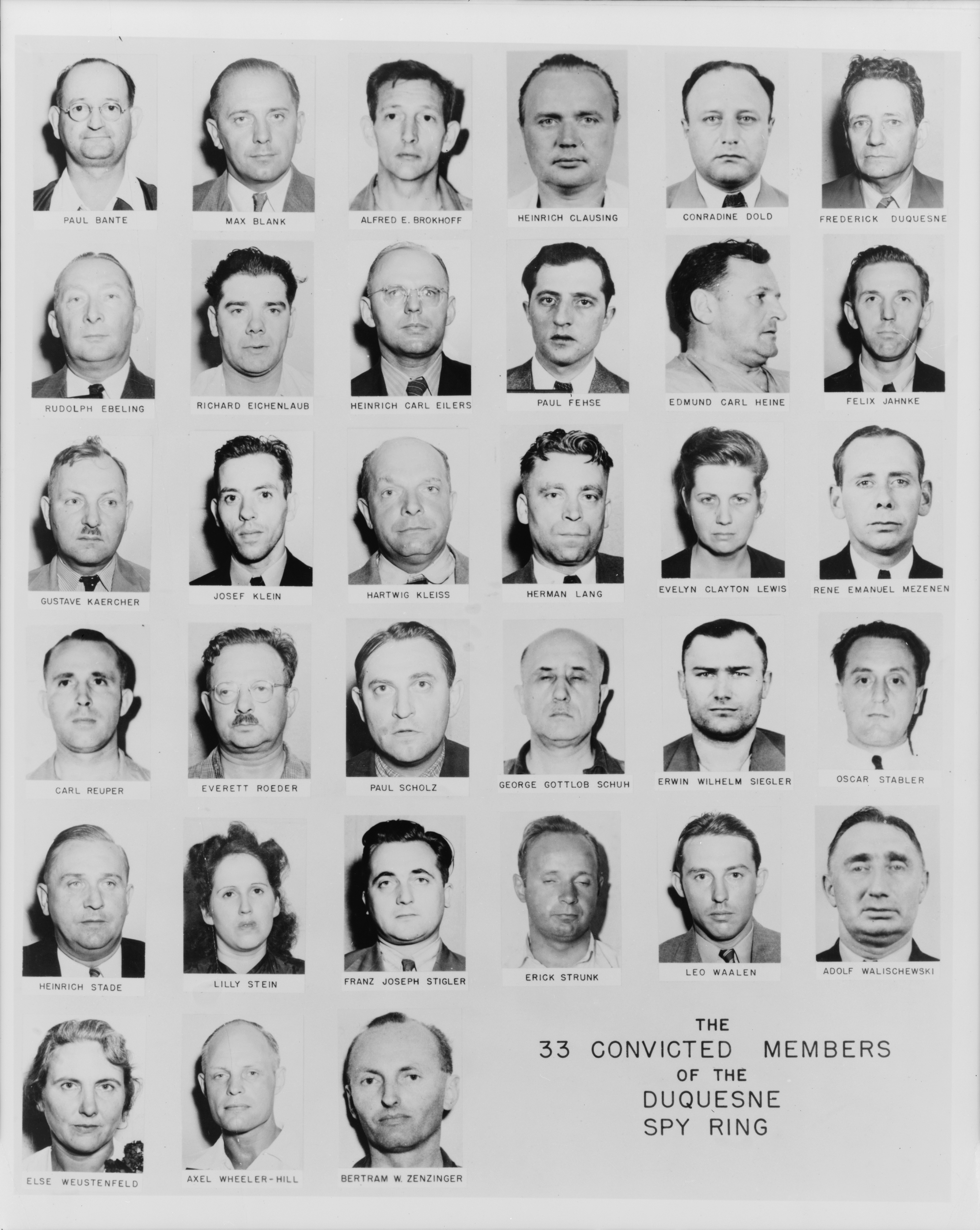
The 33 convicted members of the Duquesne spy ring (FBI print)

- June 1941 – Fritz Joubert Duquesne (also known as "The man who killed Kitchener") was arrested by the Federal Bureau of Investigation (FBI) with two associates, on charges of relaying secret information on Allied weaponry and shipping movements to Nazi Germany. On January 2, 1942, 33 members of the Duquesne Spy Ring, the largest espionage ring conviction in the history of the United States, were sentenced to serve a total of over 300 years in prison. William G. Sebold, a double agent, was instrumental to the capture and conviction. One Abwehr spymaster later commented that the ring's roundup delivered ‘the death blow’ to their espionage efforts in the United States. The 1945 film The House on 92nd Street was a thinly disguised version of the uncovering of this spy ring.

=== 1950s ===
- July 1950 – Alfred Sarant was interviewed and released by the FBI. He and Joel Barr were recruited in November 1944 by Julius Rosenberg for the Soviet Union to spy at the United States Army Signal Corps laboratories, where they worked. They both escaped to the Eastern Bloc.
- March 1950 – Klaus Fuchs was convicted in the United Kingdom of espionage for the Soviet Union between 1941 and 1949. During that time he became a British citizen and worked in the United States at the Los Alamos National Laboratory and later in England at the Harwell Atomic Energy Research Establishment.
- ca 1950 – David Greenglass confessed to and was convicted of espionage. He was recruited by his in-laws, Julius and Ethel Rosenberg to provide secrets from Los Alamos from 1944–1946.
- 1951 – Theodore Hall was interviewed by the FBI for handing atomic weapons secrets to the Soviet Union. He was not prosecuted, but later admitted to giving secrets to the Soviet Union.

=== 1970s ===
- January 1977 – Christopher John Boyce (born February 16, 1953) was convicted of spying against the United States for the Soviet Union. He was arrested in January 1977 for selling U.S. spy satellite secrets to the Soviet Union. Boyce was convicted in April of espionage and sentenced to 40 years in prison at the Federal Correctional Institution, Lompoc. On January 21, 1980, Boyce escaped from Lompoc. While a fugitive, Boyce carried out 17 bank robberies in Idaho and Washington. Boyce did not believe he could live as a fugitive forever and began to study aviation in an attempt to flee to the Soviet Union, where he would accept a commission as an officer in the Soviet Armed Forces. On August 28, 1981, Boyce was arrested while eating in his car outside "The Pit Stop," a drive-in restaurant in Port Angeles, Washington.

=== 1980s ===
- October 1980 – David Henry Barnett, a retired CIA officer pleaded guilty to espionage charges, admitting that he had sold CIA secrets to the Soviets. He was sentenced to 18 years’ imprisonment and was paroled in 1990. He died on November 19, 1993.
- May 1985 – John Anthony Walker, a retired United States Naval Chief Warrant Officer was arrested for selling encryption information and other classified documents to the Soviet Union, starting in 1967. He was convicted of espionage and died in prison in 2014.
- June 1986 – Jonathan Jay Pollard, a United States Naval civilian intelligence analyst was convicted on one count of spying for Israel, receiving a life sentence with a recommendation against parole.
- August 1988 – Clyde Lee Conrad, a member of the United States military was arrested for selling NATO defense plans to Hungary from 1974 to 1988. He was convicted by a German court of treason and espionage in 1990 and died in prison.

=== 1990s ===
- June 1990 – Ronald Hoffman was arrested for exporting unclassified software that he developed for Science Applications International Corporation under a contract for the United States Air Force to foreign companies. He was convicted in 1992 of violations of the Arms Export Control Act and the Comprehensive Anti-Apartheid Act.
- February 1991 – Charles Lee Francis Anzalone, a U.S. Marine Corps corporal, was arrested for attempted espionage after passing documents and a security badge to an FBI agent posing as a KGB intelligence officer. He was convicted in May and sentenced to 15 years in prison for this and other charges.
- April 1991 – Jeffrey Carney was arrested for providing classified documents to the Stasi between 1982 and 1984, while stationed in West Berlin with the United States Air Force. He deserted and defected to East Germany in 1985. He pleaded guilty to espionage, conspiracy, and desertion and was sentenced to 38 years in prison, but was released after 11 years.
- March 1991 – Albert T. Sombolay was arrested and admitted to providing military information regarding the Desert Shield deployment, military identification cards, and chemical weapons equipment to Jordan, while he was stationed in Germany. He was a naturalized U.S. citizen born in Zaire. He was sentenced to 34 years of hard labor.
- May 1992 – Virginia Jean Baynes was convicted of passing secret documents to the Philippines via Joseph Garfield Brown while she was a Secretary with the Central Intelligence Agency in Manila.
- February 1993 – Frederick Christopher Hamilton pleaded guilty to passing secret intelligence reports regarding Peru to Ecuador in 1991 while stationed in Peru with the Defense Intelligence Agency. He pleaded guilty to two counts of unlawfully communicating classified information to a foreign country and was sentenced to 37 months in prison.
- August 1993 – Geneva Jones was indicted for theft of government property and transmission of defense information to unauthorized persons. While a secretary in with the State Department, she passed classified documents to a West African journalist friend Dominic Ntube, who then passed some of them to Liberian rebels. In 1994, she pleaded guilty to 21 counts of theft and 2 counts of unlawful communication of national defense information. She was sentenced to 37 months in prison.
- May 1993 – Steven John Lalas was charged with passing sensitive military information to Greece between 1991 and 1993 while working for the State Department. He passed hundreds of highly classified documents between 1991 and 1993. He was of Greek descent, but was born in the United States. In June, he pleaded guilty to conspiracy to commit espionage and was sentenced to 14 years in prison.
- February 1994 – Aldrich Hazen Ames was charged with providing highly classified information since 1985 to the Soviet Union and later the Russian Federation. The information he passed led to the execution of at least 9 United States agents in Russia. In April, he and his wife both pleaded guilty to conspiring to commit espionage and to tax evasion. He was sentenced to life in prison without parole on the espionage charges, and 63 months in prison on the tax evasion charges.
- May 1995 – John Douglas Charlton was arrested and indicted for 10 counts of attempting to sell Secret United States Navy documents in 1993. He took the document from Lockheed Corporation before his retirement in 1989. In 1996, he pleaded guilty to 2 counts of attempted transfer of defense information. He was sentenced to two years in prison without parole followed by 5 years of probation.
- May 1995 – Michael Stephen Schwartz was charged with 4 counts of espionage and 5 counts of taking classified material to his residence. He passed Secret NOFORN classified material to Saudi Arabia between 1992 and 1994, while stationed in Riyadh with the United States Navy. In October, he agreed to a plea bargain that gave him an other than honorable discharge.
- February 1996 – Robert Lipka (rus) was charged with committing espionage while working in the United States Military at the National Security Agency from 1964 to 1967. He passed Top Secret information to the Soviet Union. In 1997, he pleaded guilty to espionage and was sentenced to 18 years in prison.
- April 1996 – Kurt G. Lessenthien, a petty officer in the United States Navy was charged with attempted espionage for offering Top Secret submarine information to the Soviet Union. As part of a plea agreement, he was sentenced to 27 years in military prison.
- August 1996 – Phillip Tyler Seldon pleaded guilty to passing Secret documents to El Salvador while a captain in the United States Army. He was sentenced to two years in prison.
- September 1996 – Robert Chaegun Kim, a civilian at the Office of Naval Intelligence was charged with passing classified information to South Korea, his country of birth. In 1997, he pleaded guilty to conspiracy to commit espionage and was sentenced to 9 years in prison.
- November 1996 – Harold James Nicholson was arrested while attempting to take Top Secret documents out of the country. He began spying for Russia in 1994. He was a senior-ranking Central Intelligence Agency officer. In 1997, he pleaded guilty and was sentenced to more than 23 years in prison.
- December 1996 – Earl Edwin Pitts was charged with providing Top Secret documents to the Soviet Union and then Russia from 1987 until 1992. In 1997, he pleaded guilty to two counts of espionage and was sentenced to 27 years in prison.
- December 1996 – Several days after John M. Deutch left the position of Director of Central Intelligence, classified information was found on an unclassified computer at his home. Further investigation showed that he knowingly processed classified information regarding covert actions, Top Secret Sensitive Compartmented Information and the National Reconnaissance Program on unclassified computers connected to the Internet at his homes and office. In 1999, Attorney General Janet Reno declined to prosecute him.
- December 1997 – Peter H. Lee turned himself in and pleaded guilty to a felony count of passing national defense information for sharing classified information on hohlraums on a visit to the People's Republic of China while working for Los Alamos National Laboratory.
- April 1998 – FBI arrested ex-CIA employee Douglas Frederick Groat on charges of espionage. After being fired from the Central Intelligence Agency, he allegedly gave classified information to foreign governments. He pleaded guilty to attempted extortion.
- October 1998 – David Sheldon Boone was charged with selling Top Secret documents to the Soviet Union from 1988 to 1991, which he had access to, as a member of the United States Army working for the National Security Agency in Germany. He later pleaded guilty to conspiracy to commit espionage.
- December 1999 – Wen Ho Lee is accused of espionage at Los Alamos National Laboratory. He later pleaded guilty to improper handling of Secret Restricted Data and was sentenced to time served.

=== 2000s ===
- February 2000 – Mariano Faget, a naturalized citizen working for the Immigration and Naturalization Service was arrested for passing classified information to Cuba. He was sentenced in 2001 to 5 years in prison for disclosing classified information and other related charges.
- April 2000 – Timothy Steven Smith was charged with espionage after being caught stealing disks and five Confidential documents from a ship in the Pacific Fleet. He pleaded guilty to stealing government property and assaulting an officer and was convicted to 260 days in prison, including time served.
- June 2000 – George Trofimoff, a naturalized citizen of Russian parents, was arrested for spying for the Soviet Union and Russia since about 1969. Having retired as a colonel in the United States Army Reserve, he was the highest-ranking military officer ever accused of spying. He was convicted and sentenced to life imprisonment.
- February 2001 – Robert Philip Hanssen was arrested for spying for the Soviet Union and Russia for most of his 27 years with the Federal Bureau of Investigation. He passed thousands of pages of classified documents on nuclear war defenses and Sensitive Compartmented Information and exposed three Russian agents of the United States, two of whom were tried and executed. He pleaded guilty to espionage and was sentenced to life in prison.
- August 2001 – Brian Patrick Regan, a contractor for TRW working at the National Reconnaissance Office was arrested for attempting to sell Top Secret Sensitive Compartmented Information to foreign governments. He was convicted of attempting to sell classified information to Iraq and China and was sentenced to life in prison without parole.
- September 2001 – Ana Belen Montes, a senior intelligence analyst with the Defense Intelligence Agency passed classified military and intelligence information to Cuba for at least 16 years. She pleaded guilty and was sentenced to 25 years in prison and 5 years of probation.
- 2002 – The Department of Justice Inspector General reported that 212 functional weapons, 142 inoperable training weapons, and 317 laptop computers were lost, missing, or stolen during a 28-month review period.
- March 2003 – Eighteen-year-old Adil Yahya Zakaria Shakour breached network security at Sandia National Laboratories and defaced an Eglin Air Force Base web site. Shakour is a Pakistani citizen living in the United States. He pleaded guilty to computer and credit card fraud charges.
- April 2003 – A security officer at Lawrence Livermore National Laboratory lost an electronic access badge. The loss was reported to an immediate supervisor, but senior Livermore managers were not notified until late May, at which point the badge was deactivated.
- April 2003 – Security officers at Lawrence Livermore National Laboratory discovered that a set of keys to the gates of the weapons laboratory was missing. The locks were changed.
- February 2004 – Ryan Gilbert Anderson, a member of the Washington National Guard was charged with 5 counts of attempting to provide aid and information to Al Qaeda. A court martial sentenced him to life in prison.
- 16 July 2004 – Sandia National Laboratories announced that they had located a classified floppy disk that had been discovered missing on June 30 during a routine inventory. It was missing because it was improperly transferred to a different organization at the lab.
- October 2006 – A drug-related investigation at a private residence found classified documents and a thumb drive containing classified information, all from Los Alamos National Laboratory, at the home of Jessica Quintana, a former subcontractor to the laboratory.
- December 2006 – Petty Officer Ariel Weinmann of the United States Navy pleaded guilty to espionage, desertion and other charges. His case is notable as an espionage case where the Navy and trial court officials have denied access to basic information, including the court docket.
- February 2007 – The Department of Justice Inspector General reported that "over a 44-month period the FBI reported 160 weapons and 160 laptop computers as lost or stolen."

=== 2010s ===
- June 2015 – United States Office of Personnel Management (OPM) announced that it had been the target of a data breach targeting personnel records. Approximately 22.1 million records were affected, including records related to government employees, other people who had undergone background checks, and their friends and family.
- April 29, 2017 – In a phone call, President Donald Trump told Philippines President Rodrigo Duterte about two US nuclear submarines positioned off the coast of North Korea. At this time, Trump was warning of a possible "major, major conflict" with North Korea. The locations of nuclear submarines are a closely guarded secret, even from the Navy command itself: "As a matter of national security, only the captains and crew of the submarines know for sure where they're located."
- May 10, 2017 – Trump discussed classified information during an Oval Office meeting on May 10, 2017, with the Russian Foreign Minister Sergey Lavrov and the Russian Ambassador Sergey Kislyak. The information was provided by a U.S. ally and concerned a planned Islamic State (ISIL) operation, providing sufficient detail that the Russians could use to deduce the identity of the ally and the manner in which it was collected, according to current and former government officials.
- May 24, 2017 – Britain strongly objected to the United States leaking to the press information about the Manchester Arena bombing, including the identity of the attacker and a picture of the bomb, before it had been publicly disclosed, jeopardizing the investigation. British Prime Minister Theresa May issued a public rebuke, and British police said they would stop passing information to U.S. counterparts.
- July 2017 – After a private meeting with Russian President Vladimir Putin at the 2017 G20 Hamburg summit, Trump took the unusual step of confiscating and keeping his interpreter's notes. This led U.S. intelligence officials to express concern that Trump "may have improperly discussed classified intelligence with Russia."
- Christmas 2018 – Trump and First Lady Melania Trump flew to Al Asad Airbase where Trump posted video to Twitter of several members of Seal Team Five in their camouflage and night-vision goggles, revealing the team's location and unblurred faces.
- August 30, 2019 – Trump tweeted a reportedly classified image of recent damage to Iran's Imam Khomeini Spaceport that supposedly occurred as a result of an explosion during testing of a Safir SLV. Multiple concerns were raised regarding the public release of what appeared to be a surveillance photo with exceptionally high resolution, revealing highly classified U.S. surveillance capabilities. Within hours of the tweet, amateur satellite trackers had determined the photograph came from National Reconnaissance Office spy satellite USA-224. Before Trump's tweet, the only confirmed photographs from a KH-11 satellite were leaked in 1984 by a U.S. Navy analyst who went to prison for espionage. Trump defended the tweet by saying he had "the absolute right" to release the photo.
- December 2019 – In an interview with Bob Woodward, Trump stated, "I have built a nuclear — a weapons system that nobody's ever had in this country before," adding, "We have stuff that Putin and Xi have never heard about before. There's nobody. What we have is incredible."

=== 2020s ===
- 2020 – Suspected foreign attackers breach the Treasury and the Department of Commerce.
- 2021 and 2022 – Former President Donald Trump or his staff allegedly took numerous documents with security classification markings from the White House and held them in unsecure areas of his Florida residence at Mar a Lago, some of which were recovered in an FBI search of Mar-a-Lago.
- March 2025 – Jeffrey Goldberg, editor-in-chief of The Atlantic, was inadvertently invited to join a group chat of senior government officials on Signal discussing classified military operations against the Houthis in Yemen.
