= David Barnett =

David or Dave Barnett may refer to:

== Arts ==
- David Barnett (writer) (born 1970), English journalist and author
- David Barnett (composer) (1907–1985), American musician
- David Barnett, Scottish musician and author, member of The Boyfriends and Luxembourg among others, author of a biography of Suede

== Sport ==
- Dave Barnett (born 1958), American basketball, football and baseball sportscaster
- Dave Barnett (footballer) (born 1967), English soccer player

== Other ==
- David Henry Barnett (1933–1993), CIA officer who was convicted of espionage for the Soviet Union in 1980
