= James Hall III =

Former US Army officer convicted of espionage

James W. Hall III (born 1958) is a former United States Army warrant officer and signals intelligence analyst in Germany who sold eavesdropping and code secrets to East Germany and the Soviet Union from 1983 to 1988.

Hall was convicted of espionage on July 20, 1989; he was sentenced to 40 years imprisonment, fined $50,000, ordered to forfeit all proceeds from his activities, and given a dishonorable discharge. He served his sentence at the United States Disciplinary Barracks, Fort Leavenworth, Kansas, from which he was released in September 2011 after 22 years.

== Activities ==
Hall was assigned to the NSA Field Station Berlin Teufelsberg, one of the premier listening posts of the Cold War, between 1982–85, and he spied for both East Germany and the Soviet Union. Between 1983–88, he betrayed hundreds of military secrets, which includes Project Trojan, a worldwide electronic network with the ability to pinpoint armored vehicles, missiles, and aircraft by recording their signal emissions during wartime and the complete National SIGINT Requirements List (NSRL), a 4258-page document about NSA activities, government requirements and SIGINT capabilities by country.

Hall sometimes spent up to two hours of his workday reproducing classified documents to provide to the Soviets and East Germans. Concerned that he was not putting in his regular duty time, he consistently worked late to complete his regular assignments. He used shopping bags to smuggle out originals of the documents, which he then photocopied in a Frankfurt flat with the help of an East Berlin associate.

Using his illegal income, Hall paid cash for a brand-new Volvo and a new truck, made a large down payment on a home, and took flying lessons. He is said to have given his military colleagues at least six conflicting stories to explain his lavish lifestyle. In 1986, Hall was stationed at Fort Monmouth, New Jersey, and was returning to Germany.

Passed over for promotion to sergeant first class that year, Hall was also applying for an appointment as a warrant officer. As a part of the routine background investigation associated with the warrant appointment, one of his supervisors, a major (Hall was, at the time, a staff sergeant) commented to the investigator that he found it strange that Hall could drive the Volvo, a car that the major couldn't afford.

The major went on to explain that he had, himself, asked Hall about this apparent disparity; Hall responded that he had a wealthy aunt who died and left him a large trust from which he received $30,000 annually. The major found the story plausible, but reiterated it to the investigators during their visit with him. The investigators thanked the major for the information and told him they already knew about the "trust". Hall's co-workers were fully taken in by his duplicity, and his unusual activities never drew much attention.

After returning from Germany to the US, he traveled to Vienna, Austria, to meet with his Soviet handler. His co-workers wondered why he would re-enlist, and become a warrant officer, after several times conveying to them his dissatisfaction with army life. Of course, the warrant officer rank had allowed him greater access to classified material.

During his 1977–81 tour at Detachment Schneeberg, an intelligence gathering outpost for the VII Corps' 326th ASA (Army Security Agency) Company on what was the West German-Czechoslovak border during the Cold War, Hall had a generally good working relationship with his peers, but was considered by peers to be only an average analyst. He would sometimes erupt and become upset over trivial day-to-day problems. However, for the most part he was considered to be a sociable colleague, and he also quickly picked up a working knowledge of the German language. Hall also met his future wife, who worked at a local restaurant in Bischofsgrün, a popular tourist town where the majority of the Detachment soldiers lived.

Hall was eventually arrested on December 21, 1988, in Savannah, Georgia, after telling undercover FBI agent Dimitry Droujinsky, a Russian-American, who was posing as Hall's new KGB handler, that over six years, he had sold Top Secret intelligence data to East Germany and the Soviet Union. At the same time, Sgt. Hall claimed that he was motivated only by money.

Hall told Agent Droujinsky, "I wasn't terribly short of money. I just decided I didn't ever want to worry where my next dollar was coming from. I'm not anti-American. I wave the flag as much as anybody else."

The case against Hall apparently began based on a tip from Manfred Severin (code-named Canna Clay), a Stasi instructor who acted as a translator and courier for James Hall. Rejected by the German Staatsschutz and the CIA, Army Foreign Counterintelligence (FCA) eventually sponsored him because he had a big tip about James Hall. After Hall was apprehended, Severin was exfiltrated to the West with his family.

After his arrest, Hall said there were many indicators visible to those around him that he was involved in questionable activity. Hall's activities inflicted grave damage on U.S. signals intelligence, and he is considered the perpetrator of "one of the most costly and damaging breaches of security of the long Cold War".

Hall confessed to giving his handlers information on the US Military Liaison Mission (USMLM)'s tank photography on New Year's Eve in 1984. On March 24, 1985, while on an inspection tour of Soviet military facilities in Ludwigslust, German Democratic Republic, US Army major Arthur D. Nicholson, Jr., an unarmed member of the USMLM, was shot to death by a Soviet sentry.

In a jailhouse interview, the first ever, with author Kristie Macrakis, he designated himself "a treasonous bastard, not a Cold War spy." The FBI also arrested Hüseyin Yıldırım, a Turk who served as a conduit between Hall and East German intelligence officers. Hall had received $300,000 in payments from the Stasi and the KGB.

After the reunification of Germany, on July 24, 1992, almost all of the documents Hall had copied and handed over to the Stasi (13,088 pages in total) were given back to the NSA by the Federal Commissioner for the Stasi Records, Joachim Gauck (later President of Germany). This was ordered by the Federal Ministry of the Interior after US government pressure without consulting or informing the German Parliamentary Intelligence Oversight Committee (de:Parlamentarisches Kontrollgremium), which was a prerequisite for giving files away required by law (de:Stasi-Unterlagen-Gesetz). Only a few hundred pages were retained and kept Top Secret. Gauck as well as his director Hansjörg Geiger both later claimed to not remember having ordered the return of the documents.

== See also ==
Other agents in place in the US government or military who worked as a mole for either the KGB or the Russian Foreign Intelligence Service (SVR) include:

- George Trofimoff – a then retired Army Reserve colonel, charged in June 2000 with spying for the KGB and the SVR for over 25 years.
- Aldrich Ames – A CIA mole charged with providing highly classified information since 1985 to the Soviet Union and then Russia.
- Robert Hanssen – Arrested for spying for the Soviet Union and Russia for more than 15 years of his 27 years with the Federal Bureau of Investigation.
- Earl Edwin Pitts – An FBI agent charged with providing Top Secret documents to the Soviet Union and then Russia from 1987 until 1992.
- Harold James Nicholson – A senior-ranking Central Intelligence Agency officer arrested while attempting to take top secret documents out of the country. He began spying for Russia in 1994.
- John Anthony Walker – A Navy Chief Warrant Officer who pleaded guilty to spying for the Soviet Union in 1985.
