= Foreign Intelligence Service (Russia) =

Russian intelligence agency

Foreign Intelligence Service of the Russian Federation
- Служба внешней разведки Российской Федерации
- Emblem of the Foreign Intelligence Service of the Russian Federation

- Flag of the Foreign Intelligence Service of the Russian Federation

Agency overview
- Formed: December 1991; 34 years ago
- Preceding agency: KGB First Chief Directorate
- Jurisdiction: Russia
- Headquarters: Yasenevo, Moscow, Russia; 55.584°N 37.517°E
- Employees: Classified; estimated 13,000 in 2010
- Annual budget: Classified
- Minister responsible: Vladimir Putin, President of Russia
- Agency executive: Sergey Naryshkin, Director
- Child agency: Institute of Intelligence Information
- Website: svr.gov.ru

Footnotes
- Building details
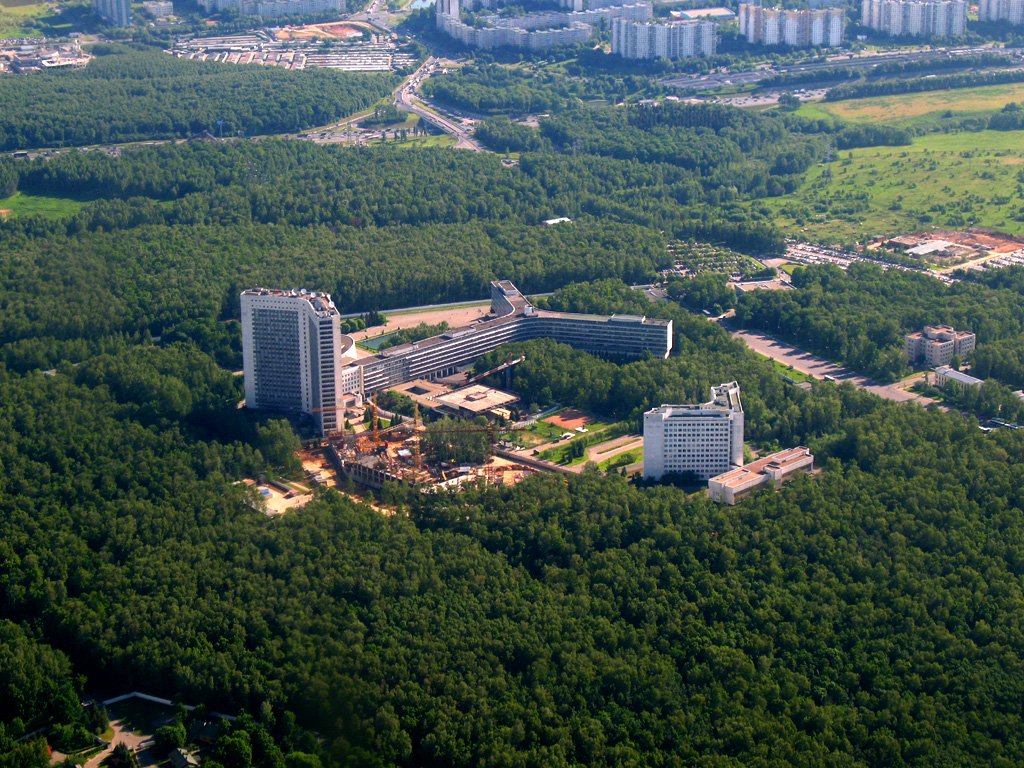
- Headquarters of the SVR in Moscow

The Foreign Intelligence Service (Note: Russian: Служба внешней разведки Российской Федерации, romanized: Sluzhba Vneshney razvedki Rossiyskoy Federatsii, IPA: [ˈsluʐbə ˈvnʲɛʂnʲɪj rɐˈzvʲɛtkʲɪ]) (SVR) is the civilian foreign intelligence agency of Russia. The SVR succeeded the First Chief Directorate of the KGB in December 1991. The SVR has its headquarters in the Yasenevo District, Moscow; its director reports directly to the president of the Russian Federation.

In contrast to the Russian Federal Security Service (FSB), the SVR is tasked with intelligence and espionage activities abroad. A small service, it works collaboratively with its military intelligence counterpart, the Main Intelligence Directorate, better known as the GRU. As of 1997, the GRU reportedly deploys six times as many spies abroad as the SVR. The SVR is authorized to negotiate intelligence-sharing arrangements with foreign governments, particularly on matters of counterterrorism, and is tasked with providing intelligence reports to the Russian president.

Information pertaining to the identities of staff employees (officers) of the SVR is considered a state secret; since September 2018, the same protection has applied to non-staff personnel i.e., agents, informants and cooptees.

== History ==
SVR RF is the official foreign-operations successor to many prior Soviet-era foreign intelligence agencies, ranging from the original 'foreign department' of the Cheka under Vladimir Lenin, to the OGPU and NKVD of the Stalinist era, followed by the First Chief Directorate of the KGB.

Officially, the SVR RF dates its own beginnings to the founding of the Special Section of the Cheka on 20 December 1920. The head of the Cheka, Felix Dzerzhinsky, created the Foreign Department (Inostranny Otdel – INO) to improve the collection as well as the dissemination of foreign intelligence. On 6 February 1922, the Foreign Department of the Cheka became part of a renamed organization, the State Political Directorate, or GPU. The Foreign Department was placed in charge of intelligence activities overseas, including collection of important intelligence from foreign countries and the liquidation of defectors, emigres, and other assorted 'enemies of the people'. In 1922, after the creation of the State Political Directorate (GPU) and its merger with the People's Commissariat for Internal Affairs of the RSFSR, foreign intelligence was conducted by the GPU Foreign Department, and between December 1923 and July 1934 by the Foreign Department of Joint State Political Administration or OGPU. In July 1934, the OGPU was reincorporated into the NKVD. In 1954, the NKVD in turn became the KGB, which in 1991 became SVR and FSB.

In 1996, the SVR RF issued a CD-ROM entitled Russian Foreign Intelligence: VChK–KGB–SVR, which claims to provide "a professional view on the history and development of one of the most powerful secret services in the world" where all services are presented as one evolving organization.

Former Director of the SVR RF Sergei Lebedev stated "there has not been any place on the planet where a KGB officer has not been". During their 80th anniversary celebration, Vladimir Putin went to SVR headquarters to meet with other former KGB/SVR chiefs Vladimir Kryuchkov, Leonid Shebarshin, Yevgeny Primakov, and Vyacheslav Trubnikov, as well as other agents, including the British double agent and ex-Soviet spy George Blake.

== Legal authority ==
The "Law on Foreign Intelligence" was written by the SVR leadership itself and adopted in August 1992. This Law provided conditions for "penetration by checkists of all levels of the government and economy", since it stipulated that "career personnel may occupy positions in ministries, departments, establishments, enterprises and organizations in accordance with the requirements of this law without compromising their association with foreign intelligence agencies."

A new "Law on Foreign Intelligence Organs" was passed by the State Duma and the Federation Council in late 1995 and signed into effect by the then-President Boris Yeltsin on 10 January 1996. The law authorizes the SVR to carry out the following:

1. Conduct intelligence;
2. Implement active measures to ensure Russia's security;
3. Conduct military, strategic, economic, scientific and technological espionage;
4. Protect employees of Russian institutions overseas and their families;
5. Provide personal security for Russian government officials and their families;
6. Conduct joint operations with foreign security services;
7. Conduct electronic surveillance in foreign countries.

The SVR sends to the Russian president daily digests of intelligence, similar to the President's Daily Brief produced by the United States Intelligence Community in the US. However, unlike in the US, the SVR recommends to the president which policy options are preferable.

Since 2012, the President of the Russian Federation can personally issue any secret orders to the SVR RF without consulting the parliament of national legislature, the Federal Assembly, which consists of the State Duma and Federation Council.

== Command structure ==
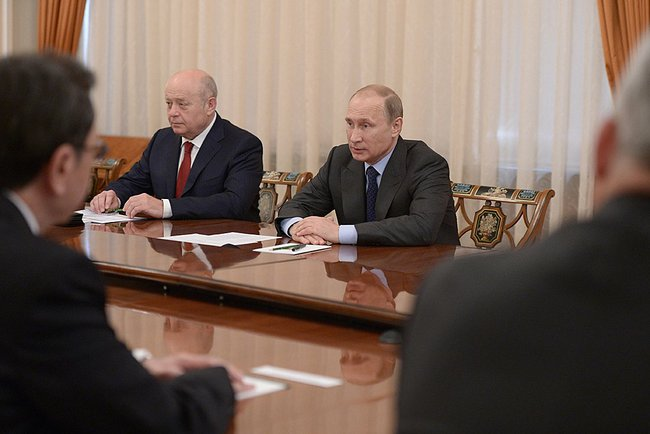
Russian President Vladimir Putin and Mikhail Fradkov, head of the SVR RF from 2007 to 2016

According to Article 12 of the 1996 Federal Law "On Foreign Intelligence", "overall direction" of external intelligence activity is executed by the president of Russia, who appoints the Director of the SVR.

The director provides regular briefings to the president. The director is a permanent member of the Security Council of Russia.

According to published sources, the SVR included the following directorates in the 1990s:

- Directorate PR: Political Intelligence: Included seventeen departments, each responsible for different countries of the world (espionage in the US, Canada, Latin America, etc.)
- Directorate S: Illegal Intelligence: Included thirteen departments responsible for preparing and planting "illegal agents" abroad, "biological espionage", recruitment of foreign citizens on the Russian territory and other duties.
- Directorate X: Scientific and Technical Intelligence
- Directorate KR: External Counter-Intelligence: This Directorate "carries out infiltration of foreign intelligence and security services and exercises surveillance over Russian citizens abroad."
- Directorate OT: Operational and Technical Support
- Directorate R: Operational Planning and Analysis: Evaluates SVR operations abroad.
- Directorate I: Computer Service (Information and Dissemination): Analyzes and distributes intelligence data and publishes a daily current events summaries for the president.
- Directorate of Economic Intelligence

According to the SVR RF web site, the organization currently consists of a director, a first deputy director (who oversees the directions for Foreign Counterintelligence and Economic Intelligence) and the following departments:

- Personnel;
- Operations;
- Analysis & Information (formerly Intelligence Institute);
- Science;
- Operational Logistics & Support.

Each directorate is headed by a deputy director who reports to the SVR Director. The Red Banner Intelligence Academy has been renamed the Academy of Foreign Intelligence (ABP are its Russian initials) and is housed in the Science Directorate.

== Involvement in Russian foreign policy ==
During Boris Yeltsin's presidency, the SVR conflicted with the Ministry of Foreign Affairs for directing Russian foreign policy. SVR director Yevgeni Primakov upstaged the foreign ministry by publishing warnings to the West not to interfere in the unification of Russia with other former Soviet republics and attacking the NATO enlargement as a threat to Russian security, whereas foreign minister Andrey Kozyrev was requesting different things. The rivalry ended in decisive victory for the SVR, when Primakov replaced Kozyrev in January 1996 and brought with him a number of SVR officers to the foreign ministry of Russia.

In September 1999, Yeltsin admitted that the SVR played a greater role in Russian foreign policy than the Foreign Ministry. It was reported that the SVR defined the Russian position on the transfer of nuclear technologies to Iran, NATO enlargement, and modification of the Anti-Ballistic Missile Treaty. The SVR also tried to justify annexation of the Baltic states by the Soviet Union in World War II using selectively declassified documents.

=== Sanctions ===
Sanctioned in May 2023 by the United States Department of the Treasury pursuant to E.O. 14024 for being a political subdivision, agency, or instrumentality of the Government of the Russian Federation.

== Operations ==
=== Espionage ===
From the end of the 1980s, KGB and later SVR began to create "a second echelon" of "auxiliary agents in addition to our main weapons, illegals and special agents", according to former SVR officer Kouzminov. These agents are legal immigrants, including scientists and other professionals. Another SVR officer who defected to Britain in 1996 described several thousand Russian agents and intelligence officers, some of them "illegals" who live under deep cover abroad.

Between 1994 and 2001, high-profile cases of Americans working as sources ('spies') for Russian agencies included those of Aldrich Hazen Ames, Harold James Nicholson, Earl Edwin Pitts, Robert Philip Hanssen and George Trofimoff. They would be considered double agents because they were working for American intelligence agencies while providing information to Russia. They were not Russian 'illegals' however, because they were American citizens.

=== Cooperation with foreign intelligence services ===
An agreement on intelligence cooperation between Russia and China was signed in 1992. This secret treaty covers cooperation of the GRU GSh VS RF and the SVR RF with China's Intelligence Bureau of the Joint Staff Department. In 2003 it was reported that SVR RF trained Iraqi spies when Russia collaborated with Saddam Hussein. The SVR also has cooperation agreements with the secret police services of certain former Soviet republics, such as Azerbaijan and Belarus.

=== Assassinations abroad ===
"In the Soviet era, the SVR – then part of the KGB – handled covert political assassinations abroad". These activities reportedly continue. It was reported in September 2003 that an SVR RF agent in London was making preparations to assassinate Boris Berezovsky with a binary weapon, which is why Berezovsky had been speedily granted asylum in Britain. GRU officers who killed Zelimkhan Yandarbiyev in Qatar in 2004 reportedly claimed that supporting SVR agents let them down by not evacuating them in time, so they have been arrested by Qatar authorities.

Former KGB agent Igor the Assassin, who is believed to have been the poisoner of Alexander Litvinenko in 2006, was allegedly an SVR officer. However, SVR denied involvement in the poisoning of Alexander Litvinenko. An SVR spokesperson queried over Litvinenko remarked: "May God give him health." The SVR was reportedly involved in the likely assassination of Maxim Kuzminov.

=== Special Operations Department of the SVR "Zaslon" ===
Zaslon (Russian: «Заслон») is a special forces unit in the SVR which was created by secret decree on 23 March 1997, and reached operational readiness in 1998. Units were deployed to the Russian embassies in Iraq at Baghdad, (Note: During the final days of Saddam Hussein’s dictatorship, Zaslon allegedly re-recruited Iraqi agents in foreign countries into Russian intelligence; provided embassy protection; removed the archives of Iraqi Intelligence, Iraqi counterintelligence, and Iraqi security servies; and was present to evacuate Russian diplomats, VIPs and documents to the Russian embassy at Tehran. Allegedly, Zaslon obtained documents which shed light on the volumes and channels by which Saddam financed pro Russia political parties and movements, as well as individual politicians. These documents would allow the Kremlin to manipulate pro Russia entities and individuals freely in the run-up to elections. If the pro Russia documents where in the hands of the Russian diplomats at its embassy in Baghdad with support from Zaslon, then the documents will already be on Russian territory if the situation in Baghdad deteriorated during the final days of Saddam Hussein's regime.) Iran and Syria at Damascus (Note: Zaslon allegedly only reported to the Russian embassy in Damascus, Syria, located on Omar Ben Al-Khattab Street.) to support protection of diplomats and other tasks. Zaslon was criticized following the 19 December 2016 assassination in Ankara of Andrei Karlov who was the Russian ambassador to Turkey.

=== Disinformation ===
According to senior SVR officer Sergei Tretyakov, he often sent intelligence officers to branches of the New York Public Library where they gained access to the Internet without anyone knowing their identity. They placed propaganda and disinformation on educational websites and sent emails to US broadcasters. The articles or studies were generated by Russian experts who worked for the SVR. The purpose of these active measures was to whitewash Russian foreign policy, create a positive image of Russia, promote anti-American feelings and "to cause dissension and unrest inside the US".

The SVR has been noted for multiple false disinformative official public statements. It claimed that the European Union (EU) was planning to use NATO forces to occupy Moldova after the 2025 Moldovan parliamentary election. Specifically, the SVR stated that NATO forces were already present in Romania near the border with Moldova, with the plan purportedly being to carry out a military landing near Odesa in Ukraine; no such intervention came after the election. The SVR also asserted that the Serbian anti-corruption protests taking place at the moment were a EU plot for a "Maidan" in Serbia. As for the 2024–2025 Georgian protests, it alleged that Georgia's Western partners were trying to carry out a colour revolution in Tbilisi, that the United States was plotting a coup ahead of the 2024 Georgian parliamentary election and that the EU was funding student protesters in the country.

== Recruitment ==
The SVR RF actively recruits Russian citizens who live in foreign countries. "Once the SVR officer targets a Russian émigré for recruitment, they approach them, usually at their place of residence and make an effort to reach an understanding," said former FSB officer Aleksander Litvinenko.

These claims have not been confirmed by the official SVR website, which states that only Russian citizens without dual citizenship can become SVR RF agents.

Russian intelligence no longer recruits people on the basis of Communist ideals, which was the "first pillar" of KGB recruitment, said analyst Konstantin Preobrazhenskiy. "The second pillar of recruitment is love for Russia. In the West, only Russian immigrants have feelings of filial obedience toward Russia. That’s precisely why [the SVR] works with them so often. A special division was created just for this purpose. It regularly holds Russian immigrant conferences, which Putin is fond of attending."

== Notable Russian intelligence officers and agents ==
- February 1994: Aldrich Hazen Ames was charged with providing highly classified information since April 1985 to the Soviet Union and then Russia. The information he passed led to the execution of at least 9 United States agents in Russia. In April, he and his wife pleaded guilty to conspiring to commit espionage and to evading taxes. He was sentenced to life in prison without parole.
- November 1996: Harold James Nicholson was arrested while attempting to take top secret documents out of the United States. He began spying for Russia in 1994. He was a senior-ranking Central Intelligence Agency officer. In 1997, he pleaded guilty and was sentenced to more than 23 years in prison.
- December 1996: Earl Edwin Pitts was charged with providing top secret documents to the Soviet Union and then Russia from 1987 until 1992. In 1997, he pleaded guilty to two counts of espionage and was sentenced to 27 years in prison.
- June 2000: George Trofimoff, a naturalized US citizen of Russian parents, was arrested for spying for the Soviet Union and Russia since about 1969. Having retired as a colonel in the United States Army Reserve, he was the highest-ranking military officer ever accused of spying. He was convicted and sentenced to life imprisonment.
- 1991: Vladimir Gruzdev joined the SVR. However, Gruzdev stayed in the service for only two years.
- October 2000: Sergei Tretyakov, an SVR officer working undercover at the Russian UN mission defected to the United States with his family.
- February 2001: Robert Philip Hanssen was arrested for spying for the Soviet Union and Russia for more than 15 years of his 27 years with the Federal Bureau of Investigation. He passed thousands of pages of classified documents on nuclear war defenses and Sensitive Compartmented Information and exposed three Russian agents of the United States, two of whom were tried and executed. He pleaded guilty to espionage and was sentenced to life in prison.
- June 2010: With the breakup of known parts of the Illegals Program, 10 individuals who allegedly carried on deep-cover espionage activities were arrested by FBI, and an eleventh was arrested while attempting to transit through Cyprus. These individuals were purportedly working for the SVR on long term covert assignments in penetrating policy making circles in the United States government. An agent going by the name of Christopher Metsos is still being sought by the authorities; the agents arrested on 28 June 2010 include Mikhail Semenko, Vladimir Guryev, Lidiya Guryev, Andrey Bezrukov, Yelena Vavilova, Mikhail Kutsik, Nataliya Pereverzeva, Mikhail Anatolyevich Vasenkov, Vicky Pelaez, and Anna Chapman. A twelfth man, Alexey Karetnikov, was deported later. They were revealed by SVR defector Deputy Head of illegal spies, Colonel Alexander Poteyev.

== See also ==
- Aldrich Ames
- Awards of the Foreign Intelligence Service of Russia
- Awards of the SVR
- Cozy Bear
- Director of SVR
- FAPSI
- Central Intelligence Agency– American service with similar objectives
- Federal Protective Service
- Federal Security Service (FSB)
- First Chief Directorate
- Main Intelligence Directorate
- Ninth Chief Directorate
- Robert Hanssen
- Spetssvyaz
- United States government security breaches
