= Hüseyin Yıldırım =

Turkish–American spy (born 1928)

- Born: March 10, 1928 (age 98); Kırşehir, Turkey
- Other name: Der Meister (the Master)
- Occupation: Auto mechanic
- Children: two
- Espionage activity
- Codename: Blitz

Hüseyin Yıldırım (born March 10, 1928) is a Turkish-American auto mechanic who was sentenced to life imprisonment in the United States for his courier role in the espionage activities of U.S. serviceman James Hall III during the Cold War era. Yıldırım was later pardoned and extradited to his homeland, where he was sentenced to 17 years in prison but served only one day.

== Early years ==
Hüseyin Yıldırım was born in Kırşehir, Turkey on March 10, 1928. In 1964, he moved with his family to Germany as a Gastarbeiter (literally: guest worker).

In the 1970s, he attended a school for automotive engineering on a scholarship of Mercedes-Benz. He worked in the automotive plant near Stuttgart until 1979. He then moved to West Berlin, where he found a job at the U.S. Army's Andrews Barracks. He was employed as a civilian master mechanic in an auto craft shop, where he taught automotive mechanics to Army personnel. He was nicknamed "Der Meister" (the Master) by the servicemen and servicewomen stationed in the unit, and was regarded as a "colorful, well-liked, outgoing low-life character".

Among the Americans, whom Yıldırım met during his work in West Berlin, two people played an important role in his life: James Hall III and Peggy Bie.

== James Hall III ==
James Hall III, from Sharon Springs, New York, entered the U.S. Army in 1976 and was trained as a sergeant in signals intelligence (SIGINT) and electronic warfare (EW). His first assignment was at Schneeberg in northeast Bavaria, Germany, an outpost for intelligence gathering of the U.S. Army Intelligence and Security Command Company subordinated to the VII U.S. Army Corps. Hall served at the station between June 1977 and January 1981. He was then transferred to West Berlin to be stationed at U.S. Field Station Berlin, a premier listening post in Teufelsberg.

Hall served in West Berlin until April 1985. He was then recalled to homeland, and was assigned to the 513th Military Intelligence Brigade at Fort Monmouth, New Jersey, for a year. In January 1986 Hall was assigned to the 302nd Military Intelligence Battalion subordinated to the 205th Military Intelligence Brigade of V U.S. Army Corps in Frankfurt, Germany, with a promotion to the post of chief of the SIGINT & EW section. The unit was connected with the NATO Headquarters. In May 1987, he returned home again.

Due to his top performance, he was selected for attendance at a training school. Following graduation in February 1988, he was promoted to the rank of warrant officer and was assigned to intelligence staff (G-2) at the 24th Infantry Division in Fort Stewart, west of Savannah, Georgia.

The units, in which he served throughout his career, engaged in cryptographic analysis, electronic intelligence (ELINT), voice interception, communications intelligence (COMINT), and electronic warfare (EW). During his service time in Frankfurt, at a unit Hall had access to even most sensitive top secret NOFORN documents, any information that is higher classified than NATO documents, and may not be released to any non-U.S. citizen.

He was an enlisted serviceman in the U.S. pay grades of E-5 and E-6 during his time in West Berlin. His last salary as a warrant officer amounted to US$25,894, including benefits. Hall married a German woman named Heidi, who bore him two daughters.

== Peggy Bie ==
Peggy Bie was an American organist who traveled to West Berlin to do research work on her doctoral thesis. As an Army widow, she had access to the army auto craft shop where Yıldırım worked. She frequented the auto craft shop to learn more about auto repair for her shabby vehicle.

Bie and Yıldırım got closer in 1985, became good friends, and soon started a romance. Yıldırım left his wife and two children in West Berlin and began living together with Bie in Wedding, Berlin. When Bie returned to Tampa, Florida, where she had a beach house, Yıldırım quit all his ties in Germany and followed her. She sponsored his immigration to the United States and they settled in Belleair Beach, Florida. There, Yıldırım took care of Peggy's mother, who suffered from Alzheimer's disease.

== Espionage ==
While working in Stuttgart, Yıldırım applied in 1978 to East Germany's Ministry for State Security (German: Ministerium für Staatssicherheit, MfS), commonly known as the Stasi, offering his spying services. Not interested in an industrial plant, the Stasi advised him to contact them later when he had information on military subjects. Yıldırım contacted the Stasi again in 1979 and told about his new status in West Berlin. He was welcomed by the organization, though it took some time for him to be registered as an unofficial staff member (Stasi jargon German: Inoffizieller Mitarbeiter, IM) under the code name "Blitz", which took place on May 12, 1980. "Blitz" is the German word for his surname "Yıldırım" in Turkish.

Sergeant James Hall III, among about 1,300 service personnel stationed at Teufelsberg, was granted the highest security clearance for access to sensitive compartmental information. The U.S. Field Station Teufelsberg (literally: Devil's Mountain) was a highly-sensitive installation atop a 90 m (300 ft) high hill, which was formed from rubble of buildings in the city destroyed during World War II by Allied airstrikes and Soviet artillery. Thanks to its elevation, the location in an otherwise flat landscape was ideal for monitoring military and civilian communications originating from East Germany and other Iron Curtain countries.

Hall had offered his spying services to the Soviets already in November 1981. He was employed in early 1982 and smuggled top-secret documents out of the station to the KGB. In 1983, Hall's activities diversified when he and Yıldırım cooperated in spying for East Germany. In the beginning, Hall believed that he was delivering the top-secret material for the Turkish friends of Yıldırım, whom he called "Der Meister". On the other hand, Yıldırım was not aware of Hall's contact with the Soviets. Yıldırım arranged secret meetings for Hall, code-named "Paul", with Stasi agents in East Berlin, where he was prohibited to go officially due to his sensitive position. Hall delivered the most secret documents from the station to the KGB directly and to the Stasi with the help of Yıldırım. After some time, the KGB and the Stasi realized by the identical American documents that they were being serviced by the same agent. The KGB confronted Hall during a meeting in Vienna, Austria in June 1985, and demanded that he work only for them. However, Hall opted to work for the Stasi, becoming the sole agent for the East Germans.

Hall's treasonous activities were suspended when he went back to the United States, because the East Germans had no infrastructure in the U.S., and Hall had problems with KGB's dead drop method of document delivery. The espionage resumed in January 1986 when Hall was in West Germany again.

Stasi chief Markus Wolf wrote in his memoirs that the flow of information from Hall was so great that they were unable to keep pace with it. They asked Hall to slow down to avoid detection. Yıldırım withheld the most damaging classified documents, burying them in caches at four different locations in West Berlin.

Hall received payments totalling to US$100,000, – according to other sources, US$300,000 – for his service to Eastern Bloc over a period of six years, disclosing data on the eavesdropping systems and information about wartime plans of NATO, far reaching into the 21st century.

It later became known that during his espionage career, Yıldırım "managed to recruit about five servicemen or servicewomen", and worked as a courier. His main espionage activity was the selling of top classified documents to the Stasi which he received from James Hall III. Yıldırım's sideline job was smuggling diamonds from Sierra Leone into Europe and the United States.

A senior American officer commended Yıldırım in a letter as "a 'true master in his field', who had 'worked quietly and for the most part unseen in making this a better place'". Senator David L. Boren, chairman of the United States Senate Select Committee on Intelligence, said that "without commenting on the specifics, it appears that Hall did very serious damage".

== Arrest ==
On August 22, 1988, Manfred Severin, a professor of English and foreign languages at the Humboldt University of Berlin in East Germany, who was serving as a spy under the code name "Hagen" for the American intelligence service for the previous two years, defected to the West, and was taken to the United States. Severin revealed to FCA agents that he had served as an interpreter for a spying American soldier code-named "Paul" at an East Berlin safe house in January and July 1988. Severin's information triggered an Army investigation into an espionage activity, which resulted in the identification of James Hall III as the traitor.

Hall's home in Richmond Hill, Georgia and his truck were searched for evidence. Bills, a fake passport, and secret military documents were seized. Yıldırım's fingerprints were found on two US$50 bills taken from the truck. Hall was arrested on December 20, 1988. Hall's inquiry identified Yıldırım as his courier and paymaster. A two-hour-long videotape showed Hall identifying Yıldırım as his middleman with the secret service of East Germany while he was telling about his spying to an FBI agent acting a Soviet diplomat. As the investigation widened, it came out that Yıldırım had recruited other American servicemen and servicewomen as well. The Army's investigations led to the arrest of Yıldırım by the FBI. On December 21, 1988, Yıldırım was arrested.

== Trials and convictions ==
Hall pleaded guilty to ten counts of espionage, attempted espionage, and failing to obey Army regulations at a general court-martial held at Fort Lesley J. McNair, southwest Washington, D.C., in February 1989. On March 9, 1989, the court sentenced Hall to 40 years in prison, fined US$50,000, and was handed down a dishonorable discharge from the Army.

In the espionage case against Yıldırım, the U.S. District Court for the Southern District of Georgia in Savannah, Georgia, was presided over by District Judge Berry Avant Edenfield, while Assistant U.S. Attorney Frederick Kramer was in charge of prosecution. On April 13, the judge ordered the court records sealed. The Markman hearing in May 1989 was kept secret. The court charged Yıldırım with selling to Eastern Bloc countries confidential information that he had obtained from Hall during the latter's assignments in Germany and New Jersey between 1983 and 1988.

The prosecutor called 32 witnesses and presented more than 100 pieces of evidence to prove a link between Hall and Yıldırım in the espionage case. The prosecutor cancelled the testimony of Bie, a main witness, before the grand jury. Defense attorney Walter did not call any witnesses, nor did he call Yıldırım himself to the witness stand. Later Walter promised to appeal the verdict, questioning the admissibility as evidence of the videotape depicting Hall's accusation against Yıldırım. Bie and Ella Pettway, another American woman close to Yıldırım, claimed that Yıldırım was innocent and was in fact a double agent.

Yıldırım pleaded not guilty. Bie stated in an interview that he was an anti-communist and had tried to block Hall's espionage activities by withholding the documents and burying them in West Germany. Attorney Walter and some FBI agents went to Germany and recovered classified material with the help of a map provided by Yıldırım. Documents were found in a cemetery buried in a plastic jerrycan next to a casket; in a railroad embankment; in a suitcase in the storage room of an apartment building; and in a paint bucket beneath the Berlin Wall.

After a two-day, seven-hour trial, the federal jury found Yıldırım guilty of his role as a courier for the convicted spy Hall. Yıldırım was convicted on July 20, 1989, and sentenced to life imprisonment without the possibility of parole.

For five years, Bie tried to stick by Yıldırım, the "round, soft, sly, sometimes funny, mostly sad, always hopeful little grandfather", as he was described, sitting in her motor home outside the federal prisons in Memphis, Tennessee, Pollock, Louisiana and Lompoc, California, where he was incarcerated.

In an interview with the Los Angeles Times Life & Style in March 1997, Yıldırım expressed his desire to be pardoned after eight years in prison so that he could return to his homeland, Turkey, and to Germany, where his family lives.

Paul Wong, a Santa Barbara, California-based attorney, represented Yıldırım on a pro bono basis for three years to obtain his release from the U.S. Penitentiary at Lompoc. Nichols applied to President Bill Clinton and Attorney General Janet Reno, and petitioned U.S. Pardon Attorney Margaret Colgate Love, without success. His contacts with Hall in prison, FBI agent Kate Alleman who was responsible for Yıldırım, and ex-spymasters of the Stasi during his visit in Berlin, did not bring any progress in his clemency petition efforts. It was said that Yıldırım remained in prison because he had not revealed the names of all the other spies that he knew.

== Extradition and later life ==
On December 29, 2003, Yıldırım, Federal Bureau of Prisons register number 09542-018, was released from the Lompoc Federal Correctional Complex. He was secretly extradited to his native country within the scope of a bilateral treaty on prisoner exchange between Turkey and the United States. Arriving in Turkey on December 30, 2003, he was interrogated by the public prosecutor and put before a court in Bakırköy, Istanbul. The court sentenced him to 15 years in prison on charges of spying and two years for prison break according to the Turkish Penal Code. However, his sentence was reduced to one day in prison after deducting the years of his confinement in the United States. He spent one day at Metris Prison in Istanbul to obey the law, and was released from the prison on December 31, 2003. After a visit to a hospital due to heart disease symptoms, Yıldırım went home to meet his wife, his physician daughter, and engineer son, who all came from Germany to see him. He stated to a major Turkish daily that he had not been to Turkey for 39 years, and had not spoken a Turkish word for 18 years.

Hüseyin Yıldırım went back to Berlin on April 27, 2004, after 15 years.

== In media ==
A German documentary film with the title Deckname Blitz - Der Spion vom Teufelsberg (literally: "Code name Blitz - The Spy from Teufelsberg"), premiered in the Allied Museum in Berlin (German: Alliiertenmuseum Berlin) on April 27, 2004. The film, produced by Harriet Kloss and Markus Thöß, features the espionage activities of Hüseyin Yıldırım. Chief of Stasi Gen. Markus Wolf, Chief of East Germany's communication intelligence Maj. Gen. Horst Männchen, U.S. Army's Chief of counterespionage Col. Steward Herrington, Yıldırım's attorney James R. Nichols Jr., Stasi staff member Col. Klaus Eichner, and Hüseyin Yıldırım were invited to the screening. The film was also broadcast on the German TV channel ARD on May 5, 2004.
