= Irenaeus Susemihl =

Austrian Orthodox metropolitan bishop

Metropolitan Iriney (Irenaeus, secular name Igor Vladimirovich Susemihl, Russian: Игорь Владимирович Зуземиль; July 10, 1919 in Chernigov, Russian Empire – July 26, 1999 in Vienna, Austria) was a metropolitan bishop of Vienna and Austria of the Russian Orthodox Church. Throughout his church career, Metropolitan Iriney served the Soviet Union as a KGB recruiter and longtime handler of George Trofimoff, the highest ranking traitor in the history of the U.S. Army.

== Life ==
Igor Vladimirovich Susemihl was born in 1919, the son of an agronomist. When he was six years old, his family moved to Berlin, Weimar Germany as White emigres. Soon after, Igor's widowed mother, Antonina, married Vladimir Sharavov, a former officer in the White Army. Beginning in 1928, the Sharavov family took in George Trofimoff, the son of a White emigre who was unable to provide for his son. Trofimoff remained with the Sharavovs until 1943, when he returned to his father.

6 December 1942, Igor was ordained a deacon by Metropolitan Seraphim (Lade) (Russian Orthodox Church Outside Russia). Following the Second World War, he moved to Australia with his wife and children. Deacon Igor later received an Ecclesiastical divorce and tonsured a monk, becoming a hieromonk of the Russian Orthodox Church.

He served from 1966 to 1972 as auxiliary bishop of Munich and West Germany. In 1972, he was consecrated as Metropolitan of Vienna and All Austria. During that era, Metropolitan Iriney renewed his acquaintance with Trofimoff, who had become a Colonel in the United States Army specializing in military intelligence. In 1969, Colonel Trofimoff had been promoted to the head of the U.S. Army element at the Nuremberg Joint Interrogation Center, a clearing house for Soviet and Eastern Bloc defectors.

Trofimoff's indictment states that, after learning that his foster brother was chronically short of funds, Iriney "recruited him into the service of the KGB." The indictment states that the KGB possessed several similar collaborators among Moscow Patriarchate clergy, both inside and outside of the USSR.

At the time, Iriney was auxiliary bishop of Munich and West Germany, but later became the Metropolitan of Vienna and Austria in 1975. He continued to hold this position until his death in 1999.

Beginning in the 1960s, Trofimoff and the Metropolitan met often and maintained a close personal relationship. In a 1999 conversation with an undercover FBI agent, Trofimoff described his recruitment as follows,

...it must have been the '70s. But it was very informal... There were no photographs, there was just talking... He would ask me something and I would tell him something.. verbal information.. He had a few questions about current events... First, it was just a conversation between the two of us... He would ask my opinion on this and that... Then, he would maybe ask me, 'Well, what does your unit think about it?' Or, 'What does the American government think about it?'

Upon being asked whether Bishop Iriney's actions made him suspicious, Trofimoff responded,

No, not in the beginning... I said I needed money. And I told him my wife bought some furniture and I can't pay for it, I don't know how to get the money. And he says, 'I tell you what, I'll loan it to you.' So he gave me, I think, 5,000 marks and then, it wasn't enough, because I needed more, and about three or four weeks later I said to him, 'You gotta help me one more time, and I'll give it back to you when I have a chance.' ...And that was the end of it. Then he talked to me a couple times. Always like this. Then he says, 'Well, you know, I'll tell you what. You don't owe me any money... And if you need some more, I can give you some more... Don't worry about it. You're going to have to have a few things, this and that.' And this is how it started.

In 1999, Col. Trofimoff boasted that he routinely smuggled every classified document he could obtain home to be photographed with a special camera and tripod. The film was passed on to KGB agents during meetings in Austria. According to former KGB General Oleg Kalugin, however, Colonel Trofimoff, who was given the code name "Markiz", always received his money from Metropolitan Iriney.

Trofimoff further explained that Metropolitan Iriney paid him a standard amount of 7,000 Deutschmarks (DM) per week. The payments were always made in used bills and when Trofimoff needed more money toward a down payment on his house, the Metropolitan "went to his contact in Moscow" and returned with 90,000 DM. This sum was then worth 40,000 American dollars.

In 2001, General Kalugin testified under oath to having invited Metropolitan Iriney to visit his dacha in 1978. According to Kalugin, "He did good work, particularly in recruiting Markiz. I wanted to thank him for what he had done."

Trofimoff further explained that, in 1987, Metropolitan Iriney ordered him to cease his espionage work for the KGB. According to Trofimoff, "...he told me to destroy the camera, so I smashed it with a hammer and I threw it in the garbage, far away."

In 1992, a retired KGB archivist named Vasili Mitrokhin defected to the United Kingdom, taking with him thousands of pages of classified papers and handwritten notes on KGB operations at home and abroad. Major Mitrokhin's information included evidence that a NATO interrogation center was being compromised by a mole, codenamed, "Markiz". He handed over KGB records that showed classified documents that exceeded 80 volumes – 50,000 pages taken over 25 years. Mitrokhin didn't have a name, but he was able to produce a vague sketch of the traitor. Furthermore, the Soviet files he delivered described the spy as a "career American intelligence officer" and the courier who carried the secrets as a Russian Orthodox "clergyman".

On December 14, 1994, Colonel Trofimoff and Metropolitan Iriney were arrested and interrogated by the German Federal Police, or Bundeskriminalamt, based on the mentioned sketch. Shortly thereafter, both were brought before Dr. Bernhard Bode, a judge of the Federal Constitutional Court, for a preliminary hearing. During the hearing, Metropolitan Iriney admitted to having loaned Trofimoff money, but denied having links to the KGB. He did admit, however, that, "The KGB was everywhere, also in the Church." The Metropolitan also admitted to having, "a very strong, personal relationship," with his female housekeeper, Gudula Walker.

As Germany's espionage laws possess a five-year statute of limitations, Dr. Bode refused to file charges. As a result, both Colonel Trofimoff and Metropolitan Iriney were released.

Metropolitan Iriney then returned to his duties as Hierarch of Austria. After his death in 1999, Patriarch Alexei II sent a telegram praising him.

== Legacy ==
In 2000, Colonel George Trofimoff was arrested in Tampa, Florida and charged with espionage. In taped conversations with an undercover FBI agent, Trofimoff had admitted that his "brother," Metropolitan Iriney, had recruited him to spy for the Soviet Union.

In 2001, Colonel Trofimoff was convicted of treason and espionage and sentenced to life imprisonment. He remains the highest ranking U.S. military officer ever tried or convicted on those charges.
