= David Henry Barnett =

American CIA officer (1933–1993)

- Occupation: CIA officer
- Known for: Espionage for the Soviet Union
- Spouse: Sarah Blount
- Children: 3
- Conviction: Espionage
- Penalty: 18 years imprisonment

David Henry Barnett (1933–1993) was an American CIA officer. He was convicted of espionage for the Soviet Union in the 1980s. Barnett was the second CIA officer to be convicted after Edwin Moore II, a retired CIA employee arrested by the FBI in 1976 after attempting to sell classified documents to Soviet officials.

== Career ==
Barnett was initially a Special Agent of the U.S. Army Counter Intelligence Corps (CIC), serving with the 308th CIC Detachment in Seoul, Korea, in 1958 and January 1959. He served in the S2 - Counter Subversive Section. Barnett was released from the U.S. Army and hired by the CIA in January 1959, after which he stayed in Korea for approximately one year.

From the 1960s until 1970, Barnett was employed by the CIA, working in the United States and Asia. Barnett was stationed in Indonesia from 1967 until 1970 after South Korea. He was a teacher and wrestling coach during the 1970s at The Kiski School in Saltsburg, Pennsylvania. After leaving his teaching position at Kiski, Barnett returned to Indonesia in 1973 to establish an import-export business in Asian antiquities. He did not succeed, and in 1975, he accepted an offer to manage P.T. Trifood, a shrimp processing and exporting company. In pursuit of his antiques business, he had amassed debts of over $100,000 and faced imminent financial ruin.

To rectify his problems, Barnett elected to sell classified information to the Soviets. In 1976, he approached KGB officers in Jakarta, Indonesia, and offered to sell them the names of CIA assets.

== Espionage ==
Over the next three years in meetings held in the Embassy of the Soviet Union in Vienna, Barnett revealed to the KGB the identities of almost 30 CIA officers. Additionally, he handed over classified information gathered by the CIA on a clandestine operation, code-named HA/BRINK, that had focused on the acquisition of Soviet military hardware sold to Indonesia during the Sukarno era, including an SA-2 guidance system, designs for the Whiskey-class submarine, the Riga-class frigate, the Sverdlov-class cruiser, the P-15 Termit anti-ship missile and the Tu-16 Badger bomber. He compromised CIA operations and informants in Indonesia and South Korea. The Soviets paid him a total of $92,000 for information received between 1976 and 1980.

On instructions from his KGB handlers, who included Oleg Kalugin, Barnett applied for staff positions on the Senate and House intelligence committees and the President's Intelligence Advisory Board but was unsuccessful. In January 1979, he was rehired by the CIA as a contract agent and, if undetected, could have betrayed further CIA secrets.

Later in 1979, Barnett was identified as a spy following the release of information provided by Colonel Vladimir Mikhaylovich Piguzov, a KGB officer stationed in Jakarta who had been recruited as a double agent by the CIA. Piguzov was in turn betrayed by Aldrich Ames in 1985 and subsequently executed. Barnett was questioned by the Federal Bureau of Investigation and resigned from his CIA job. In October 1980, Barnett pleaded guilty to espionage charges. He was sentenced to 18 years imprisonment and was paroled in 1990.

== Personal life ==
David Barnett married Sarah Blount after they met in the 1960s in Washington, DC. Blount had moved to DC in 1964 to work for the Office of Economic Opportunity, and Barnett was in between overseas tours. They married after only four weeks of dating. At the time, Blount believed Barnett worked in the Foreign Service, not the CIA.

Barnett and his wife were soon stationed in Indonesia, where he ultimately revealed his actual position with the CIA to Sarah. She claims that his frequent secrecy with his job led to her lack of suspicion when he began working with the Soviets.

Barnett and Sarah had three children: Charles, John Henry, and Dorsey, who were between the ages of 12 and 6 at the time of their father's incarceration.

David Henry Barnett died in 1993.
