= David Barnett (composer) =

American composer (1907–1985)

David Barnett (December 1, 1907 in New York City – December 1985) was an American composer. He graduated from Columbia University and later studied music at the Curtis Institute in Philadelphia and Juilliard School in New York City. Barnett then studied piano with Alfred Cortot in Paris, where he received his teaching degree. At this time, he also made his debut as a concert pianist and composer. Returning to the U.S., Barnett taught piano and music theory, and continued touring and composing.

Barnett taught at Harvard, Columbia, Wellesley and the New England Conservatory of Music. He also served as Headmaster of the Thomas School in Rowayton, Connecticut, and taught at the University of Bridgeport. Barnett is a published author, as well, including two books: Living With Music and They Shall Have Music. Barnett died in 1985.

== Bibliography ==
- (1985). "David Barnett, 78." The New York Times. December 11.
