= Alexander Fishenko =

Alexander Fishenko is a Russian spy who is believed to have been operating in the United States for some time prior to his detection and arrest.

Born in Kazakhstan, within the USSR, Fishenko ostensibly immigrated to the United States in 1994, becoming a citizen in 2003, and was the founder (1998) and CEO of Houston-based Arc Electronics Inc. Fishenko's supposed Tech company claimed to produce technology for traffic lights and navigation systems. In reality Arc Electronics was never in any way a manufacturer, but pretended to be one in order to openly procure certain components in bulk, so that they could then be smuggled to Russia.

On October 3, 2012, Fishenko was charged by a Brooklyn court with being a Russian secret agent and illicitly providing US military technology to help Russia modernize its own military. The chips supplied by Arc are similar to those used in US military weapons, according to the government. Allegedly, one of the end users of Arc's product was the Federal Security Service, successor to the KGB. Fishenko does not hold the licensing to export microelectronics, and thus, if proven to be doing so, would face severe consequences. The government, although confident they have stopped the problem from growing, believe some US technology has reached the Russian government, heightening tensions between the US and Russia.

Fishenko is accused with ten other suspected agents of purposely evading export controls, money laundering and operating inside the United States as an agent of the Russian government. The consequences of these charges, if proven, could be severe. Sources in the Russian government deny any connection to Fishenko or any others accused in the matter. Fishenko pleaded not guilty in the initial hearings held in October 2012. He chose to plead guilty in September 2015.

Fishenko was sentenced to 10 years in prison and ordered to forfeit more than $500,000 in criminal proceeds following his guilty plea on Sept. 9, 2015 to a 19-count indictment.
