= Cooptee =

Minor collaborator in espionage

In the lexicon of espionage, a cooptee is an individual, often an embassy employee, who willingly agrees to collaborate with their country's intelligence agency in an operation, usually for a specific task or mission of lesser importance. Cooptees often have little to no formal intelligence training and sometimes only exchange tasking and information with their handler through a cutout. In some authoritarian countries such as East Germany, cooptees can be ordinary civilians who inform on their neighbors and coworkers to their secret police or domestic intelligence agency. A cooptee's usefulness may be disproportionate, potentially confusing hostile surveillance in assessing the strength of the organization, acting as a decoy to draw away unwelcome attention from the local security apparatus, or surveying sites suitable for dead drops.

== Prevalence globally ==
=== Czechoslovakia ===
Slovakia's National Memory Institute has identified cooptees of the StB, the secret police of the former Czechoslovakia, who have attempted to enter public office.

=== France ===
In France, journalists, businesspeople, aid workers, and others who volunteer as cooptees to assist the Directorate-General for External Security (DGSE) are called honorable correspondents.

=== Libya ===
In 1996, the United Kingdom's MI5 recommended that Khalifa Ahmad Balzelya, an employee in the de facto embassy of Libya, be declared persona non grata for acting as a cooptee of the Libyan Mukhabarat el-Jamahiriya.

=== Russia ===
In 2020, the United States Senate Select Committee on Intelligence found that George Papadopoulos "was not a witting cooptee of the Russian intelligence services."

=== Saudi Arabia ===
A 2017 U.S. FBI report states that from 1998 until the September 11 attacks, Omar al-Bayoumi "was paid a monthly stipend as a cooptee of the Saudi General Intelligence Presidency (GIP) via then Ambassador Prince Bandar bin Sultan Alsaud."

=== Soviet Union ===
In a 1973 memo describing HTLINGUAL, a CIA operation which surveilled mail between the United States and the Soviet Union, the agency wrote "Based on KGB and GRU defector information, it is presumed that the visitor is a KGB agent or cooperating with the KGB, i.e., a cooptee."
