= David Sheldon Boone =

American spy for the Soviet Union (born 1952)

- Born: August 26, 1952 (age 74); Flint, Michigan, U.S.
- Occupation: Signals intelligence analyst
- Status: Released
- Motive: Financial gain
- Conviction: Conspiracy to commit espionage (18 U.S.C. § 794)
- Penalty: 24 years and four months imprisonment

David Sheldon Boone (born August 26, 1952) is a former U.S. Army signals analyst who worked for the National Security Agency (NSA) and was convicted of espionage-related charges in 1999 related to his sale of secret documents to the Soviet Union from 1988 to 1991. Boone's case was an example of a late Cold War U.S. government security breach.

== Early career ==
Boone had worked for the NSA for three years before being reassigned to Augsburg, Germany, in 1988. He served in the Vietnam War from 1971–1972 and retired from the Army, as a Sergeant First Class, in 1991.

=== Turn to espionage ===
In October 1988, the same month that he separated from his wife and children, Boone walked into the Soviet embassy in Washington, D.C. and offered his services. According to an FBI counterintelligence agent's affidavit, Boone was under "severe financial and personal difficulties" when he began spying. His former wife had garnished his Army sergeant's pay, leaving him with only US$250 a month.

According to the federal complaint, Boone met with his handler about four times a year from late 1988 until June 1990, when his access to classified information was suspended because of "his lack of personal and professional responsibility." He held a Top Secret clearance from 1971 and gained access to SCI information in 1976. According to the Justice Department affidavit filed in the case he received payments totaling more than $60,000 from the KGB.

== Arrest and indictment ==
Boone was arrested October 10, 1998, at a hotel outside Washington, D.C. after being lured from his home in Western Germany to the United States in an FBI sting operation. He was charged with selling Top Secret classified documents to Soviet agents from 1988 to 1991, including a 600-page manual describing U.S. reconnaissance programs and a listing of nuclear targets in Russia.

Boone was indicted on three counts: one for conspiracy to commit espionage and the other two related to his alleged passing of two Top Secret documents to his Soviet handler. Boone pleaded guilty to conspiracy December 18, and was sentenced 26 February 1999, to 24 years and four months in prison. Under a plea agreement Boone was also required to forfeit $52,000 and a hand-held scanner he used to copy documents.

David Sheldon Boone, Federal Bureau of Prisons (BOP)#43671-083, was released on January 14, 2020.
