= George Trofimoff =

Former US military intelligence officer convicted of espionage

- Born: March 9, 1927; Berlin, Germany
- Died: September 19, 2014 (aged 87); USP Victorville, Victorville, California, United States
- Occupation: Former U.S. Army intelligence officer
- Status: Deceased
- Conviction: Espionage
- Penalty: Life imprisonment

George Trofimoff (March 9, 1927 – September 19, 2014) was a United States military intelligence officer of Russian descent. He was convicted in a U.S. federal court of having spied for the Soviet Union during the 1970s and 1980s. He was sentenced to life imprisonment on September 27, 2001. George Trofimoff is the most senior officer in U.S. military history to have been charged with or convicted of espionage.

== Background ==
George Trofimoff was born in Berlin, Weimar Republic, on March 9, 1927. His paternal grandfather, Vladimir Ivanovich Trofimoff, a brigadier general in the Imperial Russian Army General Staff, had been arrested and shot by the Cheka in 1919. His father, Vladimir Vladimirovich Trofimoff, had attended the Page Corps military academy. During the Russian Civil War, Vladimir had served as a major in the anti-communist White Army. George's mother, Ekaterina Kartali, had been a successful concert pianist before marrying Major Trofimoff in 1926. (Note: The rank of Brigadier in the Russian Imperial Army was abandoned in the early nineteenth century, replaced in the late nineteenth century with the rank Major-General.)

After the death of his wife in 1928, Major Trofimoff descended into abject poverty. In response, he temporarily sent his son to be raised by Vladimir and Antonina Sharavov, both of whom were fellow White emigres. Antonina's son from a previous marriage was Igor Vladimirovich Susemihl. Even into his old age, Trofimoff continued to describe Susemihl as "my brother."

In 1943, Vladimir Trofimoff remarried and his son moved in with him and his new wife. However, the family was soon forced to separate again due to Allied bombing raids on Berlin. They would not meet again until 1949, when George Trofimoff was a U.S. Army officer assigned to the occupation of Germany.

In the fall of 1944, George Trofimoff was ordered to report for conscription into the German Army, or Heer (usually conflated with the Wehrmacht or German Military). Rather than comply, he fled to occupied Czechoslovakia and remained in hiding near Pilsen until the end of the Second World War. Trofimoff then fled the advancing Soviet Army into the American Zone of Occupied Germany.

After working as an interpreter for the U.S. Army, Trofimoff made his way illegally to Paris, France. While staying there, he was embraced by Paris' community of White emigres, many of whom had known his father and grandfather. Soon after, Trofimoff was sponsored by the Society of Friends for emigration to the United States. In December 1947, he boarded a KLM Royal Dutch Airliner and flew from Amsterdam to New York City.

Trofimoff enlisted in the United States Army in 1948 and received a commission in the United States Army Reserve in 1953. He received an honorable discharge from active duty in 1956, and retired from the United States Army Reserve with the rank of colonel in 1987. From 1959 through 1994, Trofimoff was employed by the United States Army as a civilian working in military intelligence, serving primarily in the Kingdom of Laos and in West Germany.

== Espionage ==
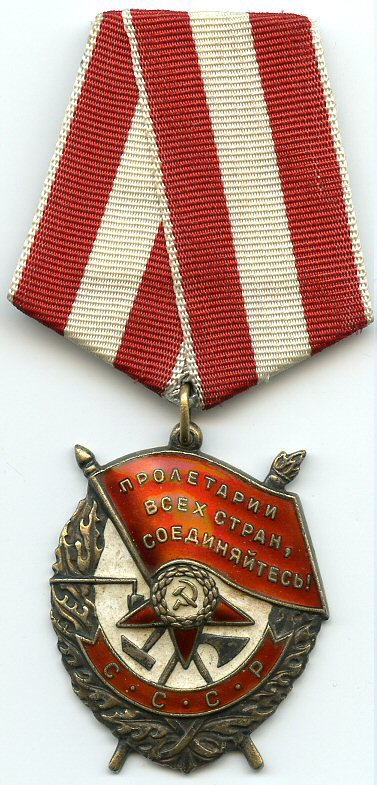
The Order of the Red Banner

Throughout his career with the United States Army, Trofimoff held Secret and Top Secret clearances. In 1969, he became the chief of the United States Army Element at the Nuremberg Joint Interrogation Center (JIC). The JIC, a center for questioning defectors and refugees from the Soviet Union and other Warsaw Pact countries, was jointly run by American, French, and West German intelligence services. Trofimoff had access to all classified information received by or produced by U.S. Army Intelligence at the JIC.

His indictment states that, following his promotion to head of the U.S. Army at the JIC, Trofimoff renewed his acquaintance with his foster brother Igor Susemihl. Under the monastic name Iriney, Susemihl had become a hieromonk and a bishop within the Russian Orthodox Church. After learning that Trofimoff was chronically short of funds, Bishop Iriney "recruited him into the service of the KGB." The indictment states that the KGB possessed several similar collaborators among Moscow Patriarchate clergy, both inside and outside of the USSR.

At the time, Iriney was auxiliary bishop of Munich and West Germany, but later became the Metropolitan of Vienna and Austria in 1975. He continued to hold this position until his death in 1999.

Beginning in the 1960s, Trofimoff and the Metropolitan met often and maintained a close personal relationship. In a 1999 conversation with an undercover FBI agent, Trofimoff described his recruitment as follows,

... it must have been the '70s. But it was very informal. There were no photographs, there was just talking. He would ask me something and I would tell him something— verbal information. He had a few questions about current events. First, it was just a conversation between the two of us. He would ask my opinion on this and that— then, he would maybe ask me, 'Well, what does your unit think about it?' Or, 'What does the American government think about it?'"

Upon being asked whether Bishop Iriney's actions made him suspicious, Trofimoff responded,

No, not in the beginning. I said I needed money. And I told him my wife bought some furniture and I can't pay for it, I don't know how to get the money. And he says, 'I tell you what, I'll loan it to you.' So he gave me, I think, 5,000 marks and then, it wasn't enough, because I needed more, and about three or four weeks later I said to him, 'You gotta help me one more time, and I'll give it back to you when I have a chance.' And that was the end of it. Then he talked to me a couple times. Always like this. Then he says, 'Well, you know, I'll tell you what. You don't owe me any money. And if you need some more, I can give you some more. Don't worry about it. You're going to have to have a few things, this and that.' And this is how it started.

In 1999, Trofimoff boasted that he routinely smuggled every classified document he could obtain home to be photographed with a special camera and tripod. The film was passed on to KGB agents during meetings in Austria. According to former KGB General Oleg Kalugin, however, Trofimoff, who was given the codename "Markiz," always received his money from Iriney. Trofimoff traveled frequently to Austria to meet Iriney and other KGB operatives, according to the indictment.

Trofimoff further explained that Iriney paid him a standard amount of 7,000 Deutschmarks per week. The payments were always made in used bills and when Trofimoff needed more money toward a down payment on his house, Iriney "went to his contact in Moscow," and returned with 90,000 DM. This sum was then worth 40,000 American dollars.

In 2001, Kalugin testified under oath to having invited Iriney to visit his dacha in 1978. According to Kalugin "He did good work, particularly in recruiting Markiz. I wanted to thank him for what he had done."

In 1999, Trofimoff further explained that Iriney ordered him to cease his espionage work for the KGB in 1987. According to Trofimoff "he told me to destroy the camera, so I smashed it with a hammer and I threw it in the garbage, far away."

The German BKA, the FBI, and U.S. federal prosecutors allege that Trofimoff was paid $250,000 over the course of his espionage career. According to Kalugin, Trofimoff was also awarded the Order of the Red Banner, which he describes as the USSR's "highest military award for meritorious and dangerous service." Kalugin further states "After all, he deserved the award for the work he did for us."

== Arrest in Germany ==
In 1992, a retired KGB archivist named Vasili Mitrokhin defected to the United Kingdom, taking with him thousands of pages of classified papers and handwritten notes on KGB operations at home and abroad. Major Mitrokhin's information included evidence that a NATO interrogation center was being compromised by a mole, codenamed "Markiz". He handed over KGB records that showed classified documents that exceeded 80 volumes – 50,000 pages taken over 25 years. Mitrokhin did not have a name, but he was able to produce a vague sketch of the traitor. Furthermore, the Soviet files he delivered described the spy as a "career American intelligence officer", and the courier who carried the secrets as a Russian Orthodox "clergyman".

On December 14, 1994, Trofimoff and Iriney were arrested and interrogated by the German Federal Police, or Bundeskriminalamt, based on the mentioned sketch. While in custody, Trofimoff was informed by his commanding officer that his security clearance and pension had both been revoked. Shortly thereafter, Trofimoff and Iriney were brought before Bernhard Bode, a judge of the Federal Court of Justice of Germany, for a preliminary hearing. During the hearing, Iriney admitted to having loaned Trofimoff money, but denied having links to the KGB. He did admit, however, that "The KGB was everywhere, also in the Church". Iriney also admitted to having "a very strong, personal relationship", with his female housekeeper, Gudula Walker.

As Germany's espionage laws have a five-year statute of limitations, Bode refused to file charges. As a result, both Trofimoff and Iriney were released. Trofimoff's fifth wife, Jutta Trofimoff, was devastated by her husband's arrest. She later recalled "I had no knowledge of any spying activities by George. I was completely surprised by his arrest and as soon as he got home that morning I asked him to tell me truthfully what happened. He said, 'I swear on my mother's and father's graves that I did nothing'". Jutta Trofimoff further stated "If I had any doubt that he was telling me the truth I would have divorced him on the spot".

After this short vindication, George and Jutta Trofimoff left Germany to retire in a gated community in Melbourne, Florida.

== Retirement ==
In Florida, Trofimoff was unable to control his spending. According to Colonel Andy Byers, who lived in the same gated community, Trofimoff also loved to entertain his new neighbors with gourmet meals and fine wine. Trofimoff later recalled "... we had therefore acquired considerable debts, especially on the so-readily available credit cards. I have to admit that I was the person responsible for getting us into this hole. Jutta kept cautioning me, but I just didn't want to listen to reason, and thought to be smart enough to get us out of this dilemma. I took out a second mortgage on the house, which temporarily relieved the burden ... but only temporarily."

Their debts were compounded when Trofimoff insisted on buying a new Chrysler automobile despite his wife's insistence that they could not afford it. Trofimoff was soon reduced to bagging groceries in a local supermarket in the vain hope of getting out of debt.

According to Byers, Trofimoff repeatedly said of Metropolitan Iriney, “My brother tells me he will leave money for me when he dies. He says it will be difficult to send and it will have to come through Church channels."

== The sting ==
Beginning on July 10, 1997, FBI Agent Dimitry Droujinsky contacted Trofimoff, seeking a meeting. Special Agent Droujinsky, a fellow Russian American, had spent his career impersonating a KGB operative in order to trick suspected moles into confessing their guilt. In 1988, Droujinsky had successfully finessed a confession from U.S. Army warrant officer James Hall III, who had been spying for both the KGB and the East German Stasi.

Giving his name as "Igor Galkin", an SVR agent assigned to the Russian Embassy, Droujinsky told Trofimoff that a defecting analyst had stolen or destroyed most of his file. In exchange for Trofimoff's assistance in rebuilding it, Droujinsky offered to compensate him financially.

Although Trofimoff was originally deeply skeptical about the offer, Droujinsky finally succeeded in gaining his trust. On February 24, 1999, Trofimoff met with Droujinsky inside the Comfort Inn at Melbourne, Florida. As video tapes rolled, Trofimoff made detailed descriptions of his services for the KGB and his desperate need for more money. As a rationalization of his conduct, Trofimoff said,

Actually, I tell you. In my soul, I'm Russian, I'm not an American ... I was never an American, it's just ... help for the Motherland ... I said many times that I was doing it for the Motherland, not for the Bolsheviks, not for, not for the Communists.

In response, Droujinsky promised that the SVR would assist Trofimoff financially, but warned that it would take time.

On May 10, 2000, Droujinsky telephoned Trofimoff after a silence lasting five months. When Trofimoff said that he had believed himself to have been forgotten, Droujinsky responded "No, no. We did not forget you, George. Listen, George, I have good news for you ... Everything has been approved ... And we're finalizing the last of the details. And can I meet you in Tampa on June 14? ... I will call you about one week before that ... to tell you exactly what time and place."

Deeply moved, Trofimoff responded "Oh, Igor, you're, uh, saving my life ... I was ready to put a bullet in my head ... Wonderful ... I thank you very much ... Bye-Bye."

On June 14, 2000, Trofimoff arrived at the Tampa International Airport Hilton Hotel to meet Droujinsky, who had promised to give him $20,000 in cash. Instead, Trofimoff was arrested by the FBI and charged with espionage. According to Assistant U.S. Attorney Terry Furr "Droujinsky's work was masterful. This guy's the finest undercover agent I've ever seen. There's no one close to him ... He's an artist like Beethoven."

== Trial and conviction ==
The trial of George Trofimoff began at the Sam E. Gibbons U.S. Courthouse in Tampa on June 4, 2001.

Assistant United States Attorney for the Southern District of Florida Donna Bucella "declined to estimate the damage wrought" by Trofimoff's suspected spying, stating that "several factors suggested a major security breach, including the sensitivity of the Nuremberg center, a NATO facility staffed by Germans, British, French and Americans; ... Trofimoff's clearance to view virtually any documents, and his longevity in the job."

His court trial was unprecedented in that a witness for the prosecution was former KGB General Oleg Kalugin, who had been head of the foreign counterintelligence, or K branch, of the KGB First Chief Directorate. Upon being asked whether he knew the name of Agent "Markiz," Kalugin responded "Yes. I did. His name was George Trofimoff." General Kalugin further described his own alleged meeting with Col. Trofimoff at a location in Austria.

Another witness for the prosecution was former U.S. Marine Clayton Lonetree, who testified about his own experiences with the KGB's recruiting techniques.

On June 26, 2001, a Federal jury in Tampa, Florida, convicted Trofimoff of spying for the Soviet Union. The jury foreman, Mark King, later said that an innocent man would have informed the FBI upon being contacted by "Galkin." King also said that Trofimoff "often seemed to be lying. His story did not jibe."

Despite his attorney's plea for leniency, Trofimoff was then sentenced to life imprisonment.

Following his conviction, Trofimoff continued to maintain his innocence until the day he died. Trofimoff said he had always been a loyal U.S. Army officer and "a patriot that served this country for 46 years and a half or 47 years." He also recanted his admissions of espionage to Agent Droujinsky, saying he only made himself out to be a spy in order to obtain money from the Russian Orthodox Church. Trofimoff claimed to have believed Droujinsky would help him only if he were in such a dire situation.

== Death ==
George Vladimirovich Trofimoff died at the United States Penitentiary, Victorville, on September 19, 2014.

== Other notable American moles ==
Other agents in place in the US Government or military who worked as a mole for either the KGB or the SVR, include:

- James Hall III – An Army warrant officer and intelligence analyst in Germany who sold eavesdropping and code secrets to East Germany and the Soviet Union from 1983 to 1988.
- Aldrich Ames – A CIA mole who sold highly classified information between 1985 and 1994 to the Soviet Union and then Russia.
- Robert Hanssen – Spied for the Soviet Union and Russia for 22 of his 27 years with the Federal Bureau of Investigation.
- Earl Edwin Pitts – An FBI agent charged with providing Top Secret documents to the Soviet Union and then Russia from 1987 until 1992.
- Harold James Nicholson – A senior-ranking Central Intelligence Agency officer who spied for Russia in 1994, and was arrested while attempting to take Top Secret documents out of the country.

== External links and references ==
- CIA Centre
- The Literature of Intelligence - Muskingum College
- CBS News Article "The Perfect Spy."
- CIA Bookshelf
- Audio indictment (CNN) read by U.S. Attorney Donna Bucella
- Retired U.S. Army Reserve colonel accused of selling secrets to Soviet Union (CNN)
