= Oleg Kalugin =

Russian activist and KGB general (born 1934)

- Born: Oleg Danilovich Kalugin; 6 September 1934 (age 91); Leningrad, Russian SFSR, Soviet Union
- Occupation: KGB operative
- Years active: 1952–1990
- Known for: Bulgarian umbrella
- Notable work: head of KGB. Directorate "K"

Oleg Danilovich Kalugin (Russian: Олег Данилович Калугин; born 6 September 1934) is a former KGB general. He was during a time, head of KGB political operations in the United States and later a critic of the agency. In 2002, he was stripped of his rank and awards by a Russian Court decision. After being convicted of spying for the West in absentia during a trial in Moscow, he remained in the US and was sworn in as a citizen on 4 August 2003.

== Early life and career ==
Born 6 September 1934, in Leningrad and son of an officer in the NKVD, Kalugin attended Leningrad State University and was recruited by the KGB, under the aegis of the First Chief Directorate (Foreign Intelligence). After training, he was sent to the United States, where he enrolled as a journalism student at Columbia University on a Fulbright scholarship in 1958, along with Aleksandr Yakovlev. In 1959, his photo appeared in a Newsweek article in which, identified as a 24-year-old student, he said: "I like Americans very much. But after seven months here I am convinced more than ever that the Communist system is better than yours." He continued to pose as a journalist for a number of years, eventually serving as the Radio Moscow correspondent at the United Nations. In 1965, after five years in New York City, he returned to Moscow to serve under the cover of press officer in the Soviet Foreign Ministry.

Kalugin was then assigned to Washington, DC, with the cover of deputy press officer for the Soviet embassy. In reality, he was deputy resident and acting chief of the Residency at the Soviet Embassy. Rising in the ranks, he became one of the KGB's top officers operating out of the Soviet embassy in Washington. That led to his being promoted to general in 1974, the youngest in its history.

He then returned to KGB headquarters to become head of the foreign counterintelligence or K branch of the First Chief Directorate. Meanwhile, he received high honors for the assassination of Bulgarian writer Georgi Markov. It had been accomplished on a request from Todor Zhivkov and then an order by the KGB chief, Yuri Andropov.

=== Criticism of KGB ===
In 1980, Kalugin was demoted to deputy head of the Leningrad KGB as a result of an intrigue initiated by Vladimir Kryuchkov, then a close confidant of Yuri Andropov who had been privately criticized by Kalugin. Kalugin was accused of recruiting an agent 20 years prior who was actually an American spy (though the KGB probably believed incorrectly). (Note: A scientist, codenamed Cook, was recruited by Kalugin in the US, where he worked for the KGB and was later evacuated to the Soviet Union to avoid his arrest by the FBI. There, Cook started criticizing the inefficient socialist system, particularly in the scientific institutes in which he worked, and was framed by the KGB and convicted to eight years of prison. Andropov ordered Kalugin to interrogate Cook in Lefortovo Prison and extort Cook's admission that he was indeed a US spy. During the recorded interrogation, Cook was terrified that a man who recruited him to work for the Soviet Union now wanted him to admit spying for the US. Cook refused to admit anything and so instead condemned Kalugin.) That made Kalugin himself seem to be a security risk. He was suspected of working for the CIA, but there was no supporting evidence. Vladimir Kryuchkov, Chairman of the KGB and orchestrator of the 1991 coup plot, alleged that in his time in counterintelligence, Kalugin failed to discover a single US agent, but his successor would allegedly find over a dozen. Former CIA mole Karl Koecher made unsupported claims that for his eventual arrest, Kalugin was responsible.

The unsubstantiated accusations did not stop him from criticizing the agency's policies and methods. He complained that the KGB overlooked corruption in the highest circles of Soviet society while it terrorized common people. His unbridled public criticism led to reassignment to Security Officers posts first in the Academy of Sciences in 1987 and then at the Ministry of Electronics in 1988. His career at the KGB ended with his forced retirement on 26 February 1990.

As the Soviet Union underwent changes under Mikhail Gorbachev, Kalugin became more vocal and public in his criticism of the KGB by denouncing Soviet security forces as Stalinist domestic political police, but he never disputed the importance of espionage abroad. Finally, in 1990, Gorbachev signed a decree stripping Kalugin of his rank, decorations, and pension. In August 1991, Gorbachev returned his rank, decorations, and pension.

=== Member of the Supreme Soviet ===
Despite opposition from the KGB, he was elected in September 1990 to the Supreme Soviet as a People's Deputy for the Krasnodar region.

==== Countering the Soviet coup attempt ====
Kalugin became a firm supporter of Boris Yeltsin, the president of the Russian Soviet Federative Socialist Republic. During the abortive Soviet coup attempt of 1991, led by KGB Chairman Vladimir Kryuchkov, he led crowds to the Russian White House, the center of anticoup efforts, and induced Yeltsin to address the crowds.

After the coup, he became an unpaid adviser to the new KGB chairman, Vadim Bakatin. Ever vocal, Kalugin told the press that in the future, the KGB should have no political functions and no secret laboratories to manufacture poisons and secret weapons. While Bakatin succeeded in dismantling the old security apparatus, he did not have the time to reform it before he was fired in November 1991.

== Exile to the United States ==
According to Kalugin, he has never betrayed any Soviet agents except those who were already known to Western intelligence. He called intelligence defectors like Oleg Gordievsky "traitors."

One of the allegations in his 1994 book, The First Directorate: My 32 Years in Intelligence and Espionage Against the West, stated that the death of Sean Bourke, who had helped traitor George Blake to escape prison, was caused by poisoning ordered by the KGB. Another allegation was that the KGB "virtually controlled the Russian Orthodox Church through the blackmail of its many gay priests", according to a review of the book. In a 2015 interview, he named the late head of the church, Patriarch Alexy II of Moscow, as a KGB collaborator. A second edition of the book, published in 2009, provided some additional specifics about some of the cases that Kalugin had discussed only briefly in the first edition.

In 1995, Kalugin accepted a teaching position at The Catholic University of America and has remained in the United States ever since. Settling in Washington, D.C., he first wrote the First Directorate book about Cold War espionage and a subsequent book Spymaster in 2008. He also collaborated with former CIA Director William Colby and Activision to produce Spycraft: The Great Game, a CD-ROM game released in 1996. He has appeared frequently in the media and given lectures at a number of universities.

In June 2001, Kalugin testified at the espionage trial of George Trofimoff, a retired Colonel of the United States Army Reserve who was charged with spying for the KGB in the 1970s and the 1980s. Upon being asked whether he knew the name of the U.S. military intelligence mole codenamed "Markiz," Kalugin responded "Yes. I did. His name was George Trofimoff." Kalugin testified that Metropolitan Bishop Iriney (Susemihl), the Russian Orthodox hierarch of Austria, had recruited Trofimoff into the service of the KGB. Kalugin further described having invited the Metropolitan to visit his dacha in 1978. According to Kalugin, "He did good work, particularly in recruiting Markiz. I wanted to thank him for what he had done." Kalugin further described his own meeting with Trofimoff at a location in Austria. When asked his reasons for testifying, Kalugin explained that as a resident alien, he was trying to obey American law. Trofimoff was found guilty and sentenced to life imprisonment.

On 4 August 2003, Kalugin became a naturalized citizen of the United States.

=== Criticism of Vladimir Putin ===
With the return to power of elements of the KGB, most notably Vladimir Putin, Kalugin was again accused of treason. In 2002, he was put on trial in absentia in Moscow and found guilty of spying for the West. He was sentenced to fifteen years in jail, in a verdict he described as "Soviet justice, which is really triumphant today". The US and Russia have no extradition treaty, though it is unlikely the U.S. would extradite Kalugin for such charges anyway.

As of 2019, Kalugin was a professor for the Centre for Counterintelligence and Security Studies (CI CENTRE). He is a member of the advisory board for the International Spy Museum. He remains a critic of Putin, a former subordinate, whom he called a "war criminal" over his conduct of the Second Chechen War, and claimed that he would absolutely face an international tribunal some day and would be severely penalized for his crimes against the people of the North Caucasus, just like former Yugoslav President Slobodan Milošević.

=== Comments on Donald Trump ===
In 2018 Kalugin alleged that Donald Trump could be a KGB-FSB asset since his 1987 visit to Moscow. The operation to lure Trump had begun with an overture in March 1986 by Soviet ambassador to the United Nations Yuri Dubinin. In The Art of the Deal, Trump brags about how they talked about his proposal to build a hotel in Moscow across from the Kremlin, "in partnership with the Soviet government." Vitaly Churkin was instrumental in setting up the deal with Intourist. Viktor Suvorov alleges that the Soviet authorities often used Intourist prostitutes as bait to develop kompromat, particularly of a sexual nature. The New York Times reported that while Trump was in Moscow in July 1987 he met Mikhail Gorbachev. Kalugin says: “I would not be surprised if the Russians have, and Trump knows about them, files on him during his trip to Russia and his involvement with meeting young ladies that were controlled [by Soviet intelligence].”

== Works ==
- The First Directorate: My 32 Years in Intelligence and Espionage Against the West by Oleg Kalugin and Fen Montaigne. 1994. 374 pages. St Martins Pr. ISBN 0-312-11426-5
- Spymaster: The Highest-ranking KGB Officer Ever to Break His Silence by Oleg Kalugin and Fen Montaigne. 1995. Blake Publishing Ltd. ISBN 1-85685-101-X
- (Russian) Proshchai, Lubianka! (XX vek glazami ochevidtsev) by Oleg Kalugin. 1995. 347 pages. "Olimp" ISBN 5-7390-0375-X
- Window of opportunity: Russia's role in the coalition against terror. An article from: Harvard International Review. 22 September 2002. Vol. 24 Issue 3 Page 56(5).
