= Harold James Nicholson =

American spy and double agent (born 1950)

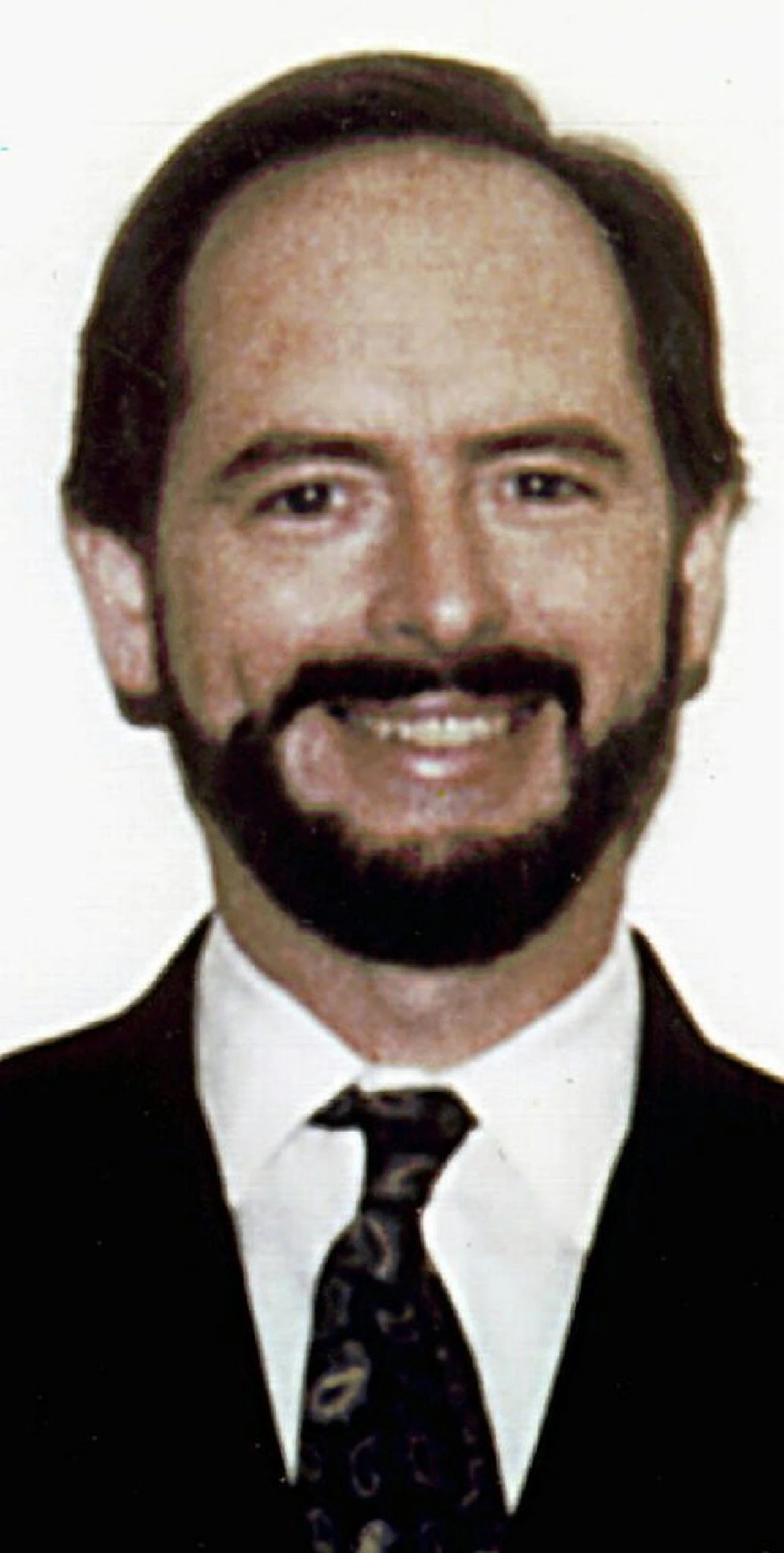
- Undated photograph of Nicholson, released by the CIA
- Born: November 17, 1950 (age 75); Woodburn, Oregon, U.S.
- Occupation: Former Central Intelligence Agency officer
- Spouse: Laura Sue Cooper (m. 1973; div. 1994)
- Children: 3
- Status: Released
- Convictions: Conspiracy to commit espionage (18 U.S.C. § 794); Conspiracy to act as an agent of a foreign government (18 U.S.C. § 951); Conspiracy to commit international money laundering (18 U.S.C. § 1956)
- Penalty: Sentenced to 31 years and 7 months imprisonment; Released after 27 years

Harold James Nicholson (born November 17, 1950) is a former Central Intelligence Agency (CIA) officer who was twice convicted of spying for Russia's Foreign Intelligence Service (SVR).

Nicholson's recruitment to the SVR appears to have occurred in the wake of a much-publicized arrest of the senior CIA officer and Moscow mole Aldrich Ames in February 1994 which, in the words of Tennent Bagley, had "exposed extraordinary slackness of CIA security procedures."

== Early life and education ==
Harold James "Jim" Nicholson was born on November 17, 1950, in Woodburn, Oregon. The son of a career Air Force officer, Nicholson found it difficult to make friends, due to his innate shyness and the constant relocation of his father's change in duty station. He attended Desert High School at Edwards Air Force Base in California, from grades nine through eleven. His family moved again, and he attended grade twelve at Novato High School in Marin County, California, graduating in 1969. That was the same year the high school had been known for a massive sit-in protest against the Vietnam War, but Nicholson refused to participate, partly because few friends had invited him to participate to begin with but also out of respect for his father.

While attending Oregon State University (OSU), he met fellow student Laura Sue Cooper (born April 1, 1955) in a fencing class. While they both were shy people who formed an attachment, they had different outlooks on life. She later admitted she was a half-hippie who had some countercultural leanings and concerns against US involvement overseas, whereas he was taking Reserve Officers Training Corps classes in an attempt to go into his father's line of work. When Nicholson graduated OSU in 1973, he was commissioned as a second lieutenant in the Army. Cooper, who was younger, abandoned a possible return to school, in order to marry Nicholson.

== Career and personal life ==
Nicholson was comfortable with Army life and performed well, as a captain and company commander in a U.S. Army intelligence unit. He served in the "Screaming Eagles", the Army's 101st Airborne Division. His training in cryptography enabled him to acquire a staff position in Army intelligence.

His wife was unhappy with military life, and moving from post to post. After the birth of their first child, in 1978, Nicholson quit the Army and moved his family to Kansas City, Kansas, to work for Hallmark Cards. A year later, Nicholson was bored with this unchallenging new career.

Nicholson joined the CIA in October 1980, and entered a top-secret training program at Camp Peary, Virginia, and soon began to accept overseas postings and espionage assignments.

In his career with the CIA, Nicholson was assigned duties throughout the world. He worked for the CIA as an operations officer specializing in intelligence operations against foreign intelligence services, including the intelligence services of the USSR and later, the Russian Federation. From 1982 to 1985, he worked for the CIA in Manila, where he had direct contact with targeted Soviet officials; from 1985 to 1987 he worked for the CIA in Bangkok, from 1987 to 1989 in Tokyo.

From 1990 to 1992, he was the CIA Chief of Station in Bucharest, Romania. At this point, Nicholson's personal family problems and his workaholic lifestyle raised red flags, and ensuring security concerns. John R. Davis Jr., who was U.S. Ambassador to Romania during the last three months of Nicholson's tenure remembers that he "wasn't keen" on having Nicholson remain at the embassy. A few years later, after Nicholson had committed espionage and been discovered, Davis said: "He must have had severe psychological problems to do what he did, having spent all those years on the side of the angels, then suddenly to flip like that." Although senior Embassy officials say they reported warnings to the CIA, the cautionary warnings, if received, were not heeded, because Nicholson was moved to another important overseas position, in Malaysia.

Despite Nicholson's career success, his personal life had suffered, as his constant reassignments weighed heavily on his wife and three children, eventually leading to a difficult divorce and a custody battle. Over a 23-year period, his family had moved 21 times. His workaholic habits meant that he skipped family vacations and was often away due to travel. The children were unhappy with the constant moves, from one foreign country to another, and their father's frequent absences. His wife was unhappy and embittered. Nicholson and Laura filed for a divorce in 1992, which was finalized in 1994. He was awarded custody of his three children, as the court-appointed guardian judged that their mother's continued anger at her husband negatively affected the children.

The CIA was aware that such personal problems were typical, given that senior CIA officers often put careers first and family second. Divorces were common amongst officers in their mid-forties. Because of his troubled personal life, officials feared he might be a candidate for recruitment by foreign intelligence agencies. During two years of great personal distress, from 1992 to 1994, Nicholson was the Deputy Chief of Station/Operations Officer in Kuala Lumpur, Malaysia. The post may have appeared as a sort of promotion, as this was a larger station than Bucharest, and a position where he met with and targeted recruitment of Russian intelligence officers. As his wife was no longer present, any personal turmoil was less apparent to his superiors, and he was free to continue his relationship with a Thai girlfriend, whom he wished to marry. He began his espionage activities in June 1994.

From 1994 to July 1996, Nicholson worked as an instructor at the classified CIA's Special Training Center at Camp Peary, Virginia (also known as "The Farm"), teaching CIA trainees intelligence tradecraft. In July 1996, he was assigned as a branch chief in the Counterterrorism Center, Directorate of Operations, at CIA Headquarters in Langley, Virginia. That position carried a pay grade of GS-15, his salary being approximately US$73,000 (equivalent to $150,000 in 2025). It was discovered that the identities of trainees of the classes of 1994, 1995 and 1996 had been sold to the Russians, and many of these trainees were his own students.

== Espionage against the United States, FBI investigation and convictions ==
An FBI affidavit submitted at Nicholson's first espionage trial suggests that, while in Kuala Lumpur, Malaysia during 1992–1994, as Deputy Chief of Station/Operations Officer, Nicholson might have been recruited by the Russian intelligence service (SVR) while meeting with an officer of the Russian intelligence service in Kuala Lumpur on four occasions during his final months there; three of those meetings took place in the Russian Embassy in Kuala Lumpur. Those meetings were authorized by the CIA and reported by Nicholson. On June 30, 1994, one day after his last reported meeting with the SVR officer, financial records showed that $12,000 (equivalent to $26,000 in 2025) was wired into Nicholson's savings account at Selco Credit Union in Eugene, Oregon; the FBI was unable to trace this money to any legitimate source of income.

Nicholson later admitted to providing the Russian intelligence service with national defense information, including photographic negatives, between June 1994 and his arrest on November 16, 1996.

The FBI affidavit implies that the investigation of Nicholson's espionage for Russia was triggered following his failure of three polygraph examinations administered by CIA polygraphers as part of his routine security update in October and December 1995, when questions "Have you had unauthorized contact with a Foreign Intelligence Service?" and "Since 1990, have you had contact with a Foreign Intelligence Service that you are trying to hide from the CIA?" revealed a high probability of deception or were marked as "inconclusive". The CIA examiner noted that Nicholson appeared to be trying to manipulate the test by taking deep breaths on the control questions, which he stopped after a verbal warning.

Another piece of information that linked Nicholson to his activities was that a US mole inside the FSB had informed the CIA that a top priority for Russian intelligence was to gather information on activities and movements of Chechen rebels. While an instructor at Langley, Nicholson had gone to CIA Headquarters and asked several CIA employees in the European section about information on Chechnya. Nicholson claimed the need to know was for an upcoming exercise with students. According to Langley leadership, there were no lessons on Chechen separatism. Requests for changes to the training program needed to be brought before a board of review, and Nicholson did not submit any proposed changes.

Nicholson was then placed under surveillance by the FBI. Nicholson was watched during his travels to Thailand, Malaysia and Singapore. During his time in Singapore, surveillance saw him get in a car registered to the Russian embassy. This meeting with Russian nationals was not authorized, nor did Nicholson report it to the CIA as required. Following this meeting, Nicholson returned to the United States where he was seen making a large cash deposit into his bank account, with which he both retired an outstanding car loan and transferred the remainder into three joint accounts that he held with his children. The FBI was unable to trace this cash to any legal source of income. The CIA assigned Nicholson to a management position in the counterterrorism branch at CIA Headquarters, while keeping a close eye on him. The CIA limited his access to information on Russian matters and Chechnya in particular, which were the primary subjects of interest to his Russian handlers. During his tenure at headquarters, he made a request to the office of technical services for a briefcase-type camera, which is often used to clandestinely copy documents. According to the job description at the time, Nicholson had no need for any camera in order to fulfill his obligations at the counterterrorism office.

The FBI also retrieved mail sent from Nicholson to his handlers from local public mailboxes, where he signed postcards with code words under the alias "Nevil R. Strachey." The FBI conducted a search for Nevil R. Strachey through phone books in the District of Columbia and adjacent counties but found no listing. An FBI investigation of the residence listed on the return address listed revealed no one residing there named Nevil Strachey. The postcards were enclosed in envelopes, both of which had overpaid on the postage. The FBI believes that the envelopes were sent to an address where an intermediary would then get the postcards to the FSB. One postcard was written "I will not be in your neighborhood as expected, still the work is beneficial, I know you will find it very attractive", which was likely code words telling the SVR he had recently been rejected from a chief of station position he had applied for, instead getting a management job at CIA headquarters. Another postcard intercepted in the summer of 1996 stated "I hope you will be able to join me for a ski holiday this November. A bit early but it would fit into my schedule nicely", which was code words for meeting with the SVR in Switzerland in November ("a bit early" was likely code words that their meetings traditionally convened in December).

That same month he was scheduled to travel to Europe on official CIA business to meet with European intelligence officers. Nicholson told the CIA he planned to take a personal vacation to Zurich afterwards. On November 16, 1996, the FBI arrested Nicholson at Dulles International Airport. He had a ticket to Zurich, a bundle of exposed film and a computer disk bearing classified information from CIA files. This included "information on the identities on the CIA Moscow chief and his staff, the identities and code names of CIA informants and the identities of CIA case officers." He said he planned to divulge knowledge the U.S. possessed concerning the intelligence and military capabilities of the Russian Federation."

=== First conviction ===
Nicholson was convicted of selling US intelligence to Russia for $300,000 and was sentenced to 23 years 7 months of imprisonment on June 5, 1997. He did not get a life without parole or death sentence as prosecutors said he had cooperated fully with them after his arrest. He was sent to FCI Sheridan, a medium-security federal prison in Oregon, to serve his sentence.

Prosecutors believed that he had sold the identities of all US intelligence officers stationed in Russia, as well as the identities of his trainees at the CIA school. He told the court that he had intended for the money he received from the Russians to benefit his children.

Although his case received far less publicity than that of Aldrich Ames, and apparently caused less damage to US national security, Nicholson was said to be the highest ranking CIA official ever convicted of spying for a foreign power. In court, Nicholson stated he was inspired to commit espionage by looking at the case of Aldrich Ames, rather than being deterred by it. Nicholson noted Ames' professional sloppiness and that the investigation, while it ultimately caught him, had been laggard. Such a combination inspired Nicholson to believe his tradecraft was superior to Ames' and that he could elude detection.

=== Second crime, conviction and release ===
At the end of 2008, Nicholson's youngest son Nathaniel was arrested; prosecutors said Jim Nicholson had used his son to collect more than $47,000 from Russian officials in Mexico, Peru, and Cyprus for past spy work: between December 2006 and December 2008 Nathaniel had met with representatives of the Russian Federation six times, including twice at a consulate in San Francisco. Jim Nicholson was pulled out of prison to plead in court on charges of conspiracy along with his son.

On January 18, 2011, Nicholson was sentenced to eight more years in prison, having pleaded guilty to charges of conspiracy to act as an agent of a foreign government and conspiracy to commit money laundering; five other charges had been dropped as part of the plea deal. Nathaniel Nicholson had been sentenced in December 2010 to five years on probation after making a deal with prosecutors to help build the case against his father.

Nicholson was transferred to the United States Penitentiary, Florence ADX, the federal supermax prison in Colorado, and was incarcerated there until his release on November 24, 2023.

== See also ==
- Aldrich Ames
- Edward Lee Howard
- Robert Hanssen
- Earl Edwin Pitts
