= Earl Edwin Pitts =

Former FBI agent convicted of espionage

- Born: September 23, 1953 (age 73); Urbana, Missouri, United States
- Occupation: FBI special agent
- Status: Released on December 20, 2019
- Criminal charges: 18 U.S.C. § 794(a) and 794(c) (Espionage Act)
- Penalty: Sentenced to 27 years imprisonment

Earl Edwin Pitts (born September 23, 1953) is a former FBI special agent who was convicted of espionage for selling information to Soviet and Russian intelligence services.

== History ==
Pitts was arrested in 1996 for selling U.S. intelligence secrets to Soviet and Russian intelligence for payments in excess of $224,000 from 1987 to 1992. In February 1997, he pleaded guilty to conspiring and attempting to commit espionage, in exchange for a reduced prison sentence.

On June 27, 1997, Earl Pitts was sentenced by a federal judge to 27 years in prison. Prosecutors had requested only 24 1/2 years.

The FBI learned of Pitts' spying through human intelligence. Soviet and later Russia diplomat Rollan Dzheikiya, who in the 1987 connected Pitts with the KGB, defected to United States in 1992 and later revealed to the FBI that Pitts was a Soviet spy. Pitts was snared in a 16-month FBI sting that ended with his arrest while he was stationed at the FBI Academy in Quantico, Virginia. The FBI caught Pitts by convincing him that the Russian government wanted to reactivate him as a spy. Pitts offered his services to the Soviets in 1987 while he was assigned to the FBI's New York office where he was assigned to hunt and recruit KGB officers.

While working in the FBI New York office, Pitts had access to "a wide range of sensitive and highly classified operations" that included "recruitment operations involving Russian intelligence officers, double agent operations, operations targeting Russian intelligence officers, true identities of human assets, operations against Russian illegals, defector sources, surveillance schedules of known meet sites, internal policies, documents, and procedures concerning surveillance of Russian intelligence officers, and the identification, targeting, and reporting on known and suspected KGB intelligence officers in the New York area."

During the late 1980s, Pitts met with a KGB source in multiple locations throughout New York City, including an airport and a public library. His relationship with the Russians lasted for five years. During this time period, he turned over information that included the name of an FBI agent who was working covertly on Russian intelligence matters. According to the FBI, Pitts received more than $224,000, first from the KGB First Chief Directorate and then—after the dissolution of the Soviet Union—from its successor, the SVR RF. The FBI said Pitts also turned over a secret computerized FBI list of all Soviet officials in the United States, with their known or suspected posts in Soviet intelligence agencies.

After the sting began, Pitts' ex-wife, Mary Columbaro Pitts, also a former FBI employee, told the FBI that she suspected her husband was a spy, though he never disclosed his status as a double agent to her. When he was convicted of espionage and asked why he engaged in that act, Pitts cited numerous grievances with the FBI and said he wanted to "pay them back".

Pitts' plea bargain required him to submit to FBI debriefings. During one such debriefing in 1997, Pitts stated that he was not aware of any additional spies within the FBI, but he was suspicious of Robert Hanssen. The FBI did not act on Pitts' warning, however, and Hanssen's espionage continued until 2001.

Pitts was released on December 20, 2019.
