= Yuri Nosenko =

Alleged Soviet KGB defector (1927–2008)

- Born: October 30, 1927; Nikolayev, Ukrainian SSR, Soviet Union (now Mykolaiv, Ukraine)
- Died: August 23, 2008 (aged 80); United States
- Espionage activity
- Allegiance: Soviet Union; Later (allegedly) defected to United States

Yuri Ivanovich Nosenko (Russian: Юрий Иванович Носенко; October 30, 1927 – August 23, 2008) was a KGB officer who allegedly defected to the United States in 1964. Controversy arose over whether he was a genuine defector or a KGB "plant." As a result, he was detained by the CIA for over three years. Eventually, he was deemed a true defector. After his release, he became an American citizen and worked as a consultant and lecturer for the CIA.

== Life prior to defection ==
Nosenko was born on 30 October 1927 in Nikolayev, Soviet Ukraine. His father, Ivan Nosenko, was the USSR’s Minister of Shipbuilding from 1940 to 1946 and again from 1954 until his death in 1956. During the Second World War, Nosenko and his mother were evacuated from Moscow to Chelyabinsk. Nosenko made several attempts to return to Moscow during this period, escapades which the CIA would later view as the beginning of a pattern of insubordination which would culminate in his defection. From 1941–1943 and from 1944–1945, he attended the Leningrad-based Frunze Naval Preparatory School, but had to leave after an injury. His father secured him a posting to a shipbuilding college, enabling Nosenko to follow his father into shipbuilding. After the war, he enrolled at the Moscow State Institute of International Relations, graduating in 1950. Nosenko had two brief, unsuccessful marriages in 1946 and 1947, the second of which produced a child which he insisted was not his.

In 1951, he entered Soviet naval intelligence as an English translator. Using connections made by his parents, he was able to transfer to the MGB in early 1953, at the recommendation of Bogdan Kobulov, whom he never met. Within the MGB, which became the KGB after Joseph Stalin's death, he primarily worked in the Second Chief Directorate, which was responsible for counterintelligence and internal security. In June 1953, he married his third wife, Lyudmila Yulianovna Khozhevnikova, a student at the Moscow State University. They would have two children prior to his defection. Nosenko, who joined the Komsomol in 1943, served as secretary of the Second Chief Directorate's Komsomol chapter. However, after he misused his KGB alias to receive treatment for a venereal disease in 1954, he was expelled from the Komsomol and professionally reprimanded. Despite this, he managed to keep his job. He received a poor performance report in 1955, and began to suffer from the effects of alcoholism. His mother intervened to have him transferred to a different section of the Second Chief Directorate, where he befriended the Directorate's Chief, Oleg Mikhailovich Gribanov. Through a combination of his parents' status and this friendship, he was able to again be promoted professionally, managing to join the Communist Party in 1957 and being promoted to the rank of Captain in December 1959. From July 1962 until his defection, he served as deputy Chief of the Seventh Department of the Second Chief Directorate, a subsection targeting American tourists in the USSR. In this position, he was sent on several temporary duty assignments abroad, including to England (twice), Cuba, Geneva, and Bulgaria. He would defect during his second temporary duty assignments to Geneva, which began on 18 January 1964.

== Defection ==
The following annotated passage is taken verbatim from a declassified CIA document referencing Nosenko's defection and subsequent treatment.

Yuriy Ivanovich Nosenko, an officer of the KGB, defected to a representative (Tennent H. Bagley) of this Agency in Geneva, Switzerland, on 4 February 1964. The responsibility for his exploitation was assigned to the then SR [Soviet Russia] Division of the Clandestine Service and he was brought to this country on 12 February 1964. After initial interrogation by representatives of the SR Division, he was moved to a safehouse in Clinton, Maryland, from 4 April 1964 where he was confined and interrogated until 13 August 1965 when he was moved to a specially constructed "jail" in a remote wooded area at [redacted] The SR Division was convinced that he was a dispatched agent but even after a long period of hostile interrogation was unable to prove their contention and he was confined at [redacted] in an effort to convince him to "confess."

This Office [of Security], together with the Office of General Counsel became increasingly concerned with the illegality of the Agency's position in handling a defector under these conditions for such a long period of time. Strong representations were made to the Director (Mr. Helms) by this Office, the Office of General Counsel, and the Legislative Liaison Counsel, and on 27 October 1967, the responsibility for Nosenko's further handling was transferred to [possible KGB "mole" Bruce Solie in] the Office of Security under the direction of the Deputy Director of Central Intelligence, then Admiral Rufus Taylor.

Nosenko was moved to a comfortable safehouse in the Washington area and was interviewed under friendly, sympathetic conditions by his Security [Office] Case Officer, Mr. Solie, for more than a year. It soon became apparent that Nosenko was bona fide and he was moved to more comfortable surroundings with considerable freedom of independent movement and has continued to cooperate fully with the Federal Bureau of Investigation and this Office since that time. He has proven to be the most valuable and economical defector this Agency has ever had and leads which were ignored by the SR Division were explored and have resulted in the arrest and prosecution [redacted] He currently is living under an alias; secured a divorce from his Russian wife and remarried an American citizen. He is happy, relaxed, and appreciative of the treatment accorded him and states "while I regret my three years of incarceration, I have no bitterness and now understand how it could happen."

The official CIA account by the Office of Security differs significantly from the version provided by Nosenko's case officer, Tennent H. Bagley, who handled his case from mid-June 1962 to late October 1967. In his 1978 HSCA testimony, his 2007 book Spy Wars, and his 2014 follow-up PDF Ghosts of the Spy Wars, Bagley claimed that Nosenko, unwilling to leave his beloved wife and two daughters behind in Moscow, "defected in place" to the CIA in late May 1962. He further asserted that none of the leads Nosenko provided to the CIA identified Soviet assets who (1) had current access to NATO governmental secrets, (2) were actively cooperating with Soviet intelligence at the time, and (3) had previously been unsuspected by Western counterintelligence agencies.

In late May 1962 (according to Bagley, though some sources suggest early June), Nosenko contacted the CIA in Geneva, Switzerland, about two months after accompanying an arms-control delegation to the city as its ostensible security officer. He met one-on-one with Bagley at a Geneva safe house and offered his services to the CIA in exchange for approximately $250 worth of Swiss francs. He explained that he had spent the money on "wine, women, and song" and needed to replenish it, as it was an unauthorized expenditure of KGB funds that he would soon have to account for with his superiors.

Nosenko told Bagley that he was a major in the KGB's Second Chief Directorate (now part of the FSB). He claimed that until recently, he had served as the deputy chief of the KGB department targeting the American Embassy in Moscow and was now the head of the department responsible for monitoring and attempting to recruit American and British tourists in the USSR. He provided some information that could only have been known by someone connected to the KGB, and Bagley assured him that he would receive the requested money at their next meeting.

Nosenko volunteered that he did not want to leave his wife and two daughters behind in Moscow and, therefore, would never defect to the West. However, he promised to reestablish contact with the CIA whenever he was permitted to travel outside the USSR, emphasizing that he did not want to be approached inside the Soviet Union.

As he was leaving, Nosenko mentioned that he knew how the CIA’s spy, GRU Colonel Pyotr Semyonovich Popov, had been caught. However, he said he did not have enough time to share the details at that moment and would provide them "next time."

Nosenko, who spoke English, met one-on-one with Bagley, who understood Russian, during their first meeting. For the remaining four meetings, he was joined by Bagley and Russian-born George Kisevalter.

During the second meeting, Nosenko told Bagley and Kisevalter that GRU Colonel Pyotr Semyonovich Popov had been caught due to superior KGB surveillance in Moscow. He claimed that an American diplomat, George Winters, had been observed mailing a letter to Popov, leading to his arrest.

Nosenko returned to Moscow with the delegation in mid-June, while Bagley and Kisevalter flew separately to CIA Headquarters—each carrying copies of the tape recordings and each other's notes.

In late January 1964, two months after the assassination of President John F. Kennedy by a former Marine who had lived in the USSR for two and a half years, Nosenko once again accompanied the delegation to Geneva and reestablished contact with Bagley and Kisevalter.

He shocked them by claiming that he had been the case officer for the accused assassin, Lee Harvey Oswald, during Oswald’s time in the Soviet Union. A few days later, he nervously informed them that he had received a telegram from Moscow ordering his immediate return. He interpreted this as a sign that the Kremlin had discovered his espionage for the CIA. Believing his life to be in danger, he expressed his urgent desire to defect to the United States immediately, despite knowing it would mean leaving his wife and daughters behind in Moscow to fend for themselves.

Regarding the recall telegram Nosenko claimed to have received from KGB headquarters, the CIA later determined that no such message had been sent. Nosenko eventually admitted that he had fabricated the story to persuade the CIA to accept his request to defect to the United States.

== Lee Harvey Oswald ==
Nosenko claimed that he had supervised the KGB file on Lee Harvey Oswald, which had been collated when Oswald defected to the Soviet Union. He told the CIA that "it was decided that Oswald was of no interest whatsoever, so the KGB recommended that he go home to the United States", and of his wife, Marina Oswald, he said that "she already had anti-Soviet characteristics. She was not too smart anyway and not an educated person.....The Soviets were glad to get rid of them both". He offered to testify to this before the Warren Commission, which was in the process of investigating the assassination of John F. Kennedy. However some within the CIA, such as Counterintelligence chief James Jesus Angleton, suspected at the time that Nosenko was a fake defector. He was therefore not permitted to do so. However, in 1978, Nosenko testified before the House Select Committee on Assassinations (HSCA), when he testified that Oswald "wasn't considered an interesting target" by the Soviet government.

== Concerns that Nosenko was a triple agent ==
By mid-1964, the CIA’s Soviet Bloc Division (formerly the Soviet Russia Division) strongly suspected that Nosenko was a KGB plant for several reasons. One major concern was that he had lied twice about his rank and had even provided an official KGB document to support his second lie.

Additionally, Anatoliy Golitsyn had warned that the KGB would soon send someone like Nosenko to discredit him. This warning seemed to be fulfilled in the eyes of Bagley and James Angleton when Bagley reviewed Golitsyn’s extensive file at CIA headquarters. He realized that everything Nosenko had told Kisevalter and himself in Geneva about specific Soviet penetrations of NATO intelligence services either contradicted or minimized what Golitsyn had already revealed to Angleton. This was especially suspicious given that Golitsyn and Nosenko had worked in different parts of the highly compartmentalized KGB.

About a month after Nosenko arrived in the U.S., Bagley took him on a two-week vacation to Hawaii. When they returned to Washington, Nosenko—who had not cooperated with the CIA's interviewers up to that point—was detained in a Washington-area "safe house." There, he was administered a polygraph exam, subjected to interrogations, and from 1965 to 1967, endured increasingly harsh interrogations and conditions. These included being held in a purpose-built, bunker-like safe house, as part of an operation approved by CIA Director John A. McCone.

Although Nosenko fell into a trance-like state and came close to "breaking" at one point, he never actually did.

The situation became even more complicated when a KGB informant to the FBI's New York City field office, Alexey Kulak, confirmed that Nosenko was a lieutenant colonel. However, it was later revealed that Nosenko, by his own admission, was actually only a captain. At that point, the Nosenko issue evolved into an inter-service confrontation. The CIA’s Soviet Russia Division/Soviet Bloc Division considered Nosenko a false defector, while the FBI, largely based on information from Kulak and another KGB informant, Dmitri Polyakov (Top Hat), accepted him as genuine.

According to Bagley, Polyakov did begin spying for the CIA after leaving his post at the U.N. in New York City and being reassigned to Burma, Moscow, and India. However, he was eventually caught by the KGB in Moscow and executed.

Nosenko underwent three polygraph exams administered by the CIA: two by the Soviet Russia Division/Soviet Bloc Division (in 1964 and 1966), and one by Bruce Solie of the Office of Security in 1968. The results of the 1964 and 1966 exams suggested that Nosenko was lying, while the 1968 exam seemed to indicate that he was telling the truth. All three exams were extensively analyzed by external polygraph expert Richard O. Arther, who concluded in a ten-page report to the HSCA that the 1966 exam was the most reliable of the three.

Some of the evidence against Nosenko came from the analysis of his file by an earlier KGB defector, Peter Deriabin, who had defected to the U.S. in 1954. Deriabin had worked in the same sections of the KGB where Nosenko claimed to have served, but he found the details of Nosenko's stories—which changed over time—to be unconvincing. Years after the incident, Deriabin still believed Nosenko was a KGB plant.

Deriabin noticed many inconsistencies and errors in Nosenko's accounts. For example:

- Nosenko "could not describe in detail how such a [KGB file] check is done..."
- Nosenko, who had ostensibly served as a security officer for delegations, "could not even explain how Soviet citizens are checked... before going abroad."
- Nosenko "knew so little about day-to-day procedures... that one can only conclude that he had never been a KGB officer, at least not in Moscow..."

When the interrogations by the Soviet Russia Division/Soviet Bloc Division failed to "break" Nosenko over a period of three years, his case was transferred to Bruce Solie of the Office of Security. Solie was able to effectively clear Nosenko, secure his release from confinement, have him reimbursed for his troubles, and eventually arrange for him to be hired by the Agency to teach counterintelligence to its new recruits.

The question of whether Nosenko was a KGB plant remains controversial. Many believe he was a misunderstood true defector, while others argue that he was originally dispatched to the CIA in mid-June 1962 to protect a KGB mole within the agency, who was threatened by the revelations of true defector Anatoliy Golitsyn. It is further believed that Nosenko physically defected to the U.S. seventeen months later because the KGB believed the CIA trusted him. As a result, he was sent to the U.S. to testify before the Warren Commission, claiming that Lee Harvey Oswald, the accused assassin of President Kennedy who had lived in the Soviet Union for two and a half years, was not a KGB agent.

Nosenko claimed to have been tortured and even given LSD during his incarceration by the CIA, stating, "it almost killed me." These allegations were denied by Bagley and Richard Helms, the Director of the CIA during the most intense part of Nosenko's interrogations.

Regarding Anatoliy Golitsyn, his defection led the KGB to order fifty-four Rezidentura to temporarily suspend all meetings with important agents. The KGB also made significant efforts to discredit Golitsyn by spreading disinformation, including claims that he was involved in illegal smuggling operations. After five years, in 1967, the KGB's assassination and sabotage section under Viktor Vladimirov discovered Golitsyn's CIA hideout in Canada and attempted, unsuccessfully, to assassinate him.

Tennent H. Bagley was Nosenko's case officer from late May (some say early June) of 1962 until he was routinely reposted in late 1967 to Brussels, Belgium, as Chief of Station. Bagley, who later became Deputy Chief of the CIA's Soviet Bloc Division and Chief of the SBD's Counterintelligence section, wrote a book largely focused on the Nosenko case. In 2013, Bagley published another book in which he revealed details he had gathered by comparing notes with Sergey Kondrashev, the head of disinformation operations for the KGB's First Chief Directorate. Ever since Bagley read Golitsyn's file at CIA headquarters in mid-June 1962, he suspected that Nosenko was a false defector. He was pleased to have his suspicions confirmed by Kondrashev.

In 2013, former CIA officer W. Alan Messer published an article titled "In Pursuit of the Squared Circle: The Nosenko Theories Revisited" in Volume 26 of International Journal of Intelligence and CounterIntelligence in which he speculates that Nosenko was a false in-place defector in Geneva in June 1962 and a rogue physical defector to the U.S. in February 1964 whose bona fides in the U.S. the KGB had no choice but to support, through Soviet Intelligence operatives like Aleksey Kulak (aka "Fedora"), Boris Orekhov (aka "Shamrock"), Igor Kochnov (aka "Kitty Hawk"), and Vitaly Yurchenko (aka "The Homesick Defector"), because he was telling the CIA and the FBI what it desperately wanted them to hear – that the KGB had absolutely nothing to do with Lee Harvey Oswald during the two-and-one-half years the former Marine radar operator lived in Minsk, Belarus.

== The incriminating "Zepp" incident ==
In April 1961, GRU Colonel Oleg Penkovsky was recruited by the CIA and MI6 in London. Two weeks later, Penkovsky and his Moscow-based MI6 contact, Greville Wynne, were secretly recorded by the KGB while having a meal in a Moscow restaurant. During the meal, one of them asked the other about "Zeph," a bargirl named Stephanie with whom Penkovsky had become smitten during his time in London.

In June 1962, Nosenko unexpectedly asked his CIA case officers, Tennent H. Bagley and George Kisevalter, about "Zepp." He claimed that high-tech KGB surveillance had overheard U.S. Assistant Naval Attaché Leo J. Dulacki and his Indonesian counterpart discussing this mysterious person.

The fact that the KGB had confused Stephanie's nickname, "Zeph," with the name "Zepp" only became apparent to Wynne a couple of years later. While imprisoned in Moscow for the Penkovsky affair, he was played the tape recording of his and Penkovsky's conversation in the Moscow restaurant and was asked by his interrogator, "Who is Zepp?" Wynne later relayed this anecdote to his MI6 debriefers after his release by the Soviets. This suggested to Bagley, as he noted in his book Spy Wars, that the KGB had become aware of Penkovsky's treason within a couple of weeks of his recruitment by the CIA and MI6. Bagley argued that the reason Penkovsky wasn't arrested until sixteen months later was that he had been betrayed by a high-level KGB "mole" in American or British intelligence, whom the KGB knew would be easily uncovered if Penkovsky were arrested too soon. Bagley also suggested that it had taken the Soviets sixteen months to set up a false scenario in which they could safely arrest Penkovsky.

== Aftermath ==
On March 1, 1969, Nosenko was formally acknowledged as a genuine defector and released, with $80,000 in financial compensation from the CIA. He was also provided with a new identity to live out his life in the southern United States.

The harsh interrogations and Spartan living conditions he endured during his three-year detention by the Soviet Russia Division/Soviet Bloc Division were two of the "abuses" documented in the CIA's "Family Jewels" documents in 1973. In an internal note at the CIA in 1978, then DCI Stansfield Turner, referring to Nosenko's solitary confinement, stated:

The excessively harsh treatment of Mr. Nosenko went beyond the bounds of propriety or good judgment. At my request, Mr. Hart has discussed this case with many senior officers to make certain that its history will not again be repeated. The other main lesson to be learned is that although counterintelligence analysis necessarily involves the making of hypotheses, we must at all times treat them as what they are, and not act on them until they have been objectively tested in an impartial manner.

On November 16, 1978, Bagley was permitted by the HSCA to testify (and to recite a 23-page letter he had written to G. Robert Blakey on October 11) in rebuttal to what the aforementioned CIA officer, John L. Hart, had told the committee on September 15, 1978, regarding Bagley's alleged mistreatment of, and unjustified "bias" against, Nosenko.

The case has been examined in several books and the 1986 movie Yuri Nosenko: Double Agent, starring Tommy Lee Jones. The movie depicted the intense debate over whether Nosenko was a true defector.

Although Nosenko did help narrow down the search for a KGB "mole" in the British Admiralty, John Vassall, after Golitsyn had pointed British Intelligence in the right direction, Bagley points out in Spy Wars and his PDF follow-up Ghosts of the Spy Wars that Nosenko didn't uncover anyone who wasn't already suspected or who hadn't already lost access to classified information.

By March 1976, Nosenko's CIA cryptonym was PDDONOR, and he had already changed his name to George Martin Rosnek. He died on August 23, 2008.

Seventeen audio files of interviews with Nosenko during the investigation of the Kennedy assassination were made public by the National Archives on July 24, 2017.

=== The differing accounts of Bagley and Kisevalter regarding Nosenko ===
In his authorized biography of George Kisevalter, author Clarence Ashley describes Kisevalter disagreeing with Bagley (who is not named in the book but is referred to several times as "the other case officer" or "the original case officer") on several points regarding the Nosenko case. The most important disagreement was over Nosenko's contradictory statements in 1964 about whether he had said in 1962 that his underlings in the American Embassy section had seen the embassy's security officer, John Abidian, "setting up" Oleg Penkovsky's "dead drop" in Moscow in late December 1960.

Bagley was adamant that Nosenko had not made this claim in 1962 but had instead stated that his section had monitored Abidian and found "nothing but a pair of girl's panties in his bedroom." Initially, Nosenko insisted he had said in 1962 that Abidian had been spotted "setting up" the dead drop in 1960, and Kisevalter agreed with him. This issue had significant implications for Nosenko's "bona fides" because Abidian didn't check on the dead drop until late December 1961.

Furthermore, Nosenko had told Bagley and Kisevalter in 1962 that he had transferred out of the American Embassy section of the KGB at the end of 1961, which, if true, would have meant he no longer had access to the reports on the dead-drop monitoring that would have been generated after that time. Nosenko, however, claimed in 1964 to have read these reports.

This perplexing contradiction is discussed by authors Jeremy Duns and David Wise in their respective books Dead Drop and Mole Hunt. Bagley saw this discrepancy as one of several indications that Popov had not been caught due to KGB surveillance, but instead had been betrayed by a "mole" in the CIA.

Another point of disagreement between Bagley and Kisevalter was whether or not Nosenko was "always drunk," as claimed by Kisevalter and Nosenko, during his meetings with them in 1962. Bagley acknowledged that Nosenko did drink a lot in the safe house but insisted that he never appeared to be inebriated. In contrast, Kisevalter agreed with Nosenko's claim that, having allegedly stopped at several bars on his way to the safe house as part of his "anti-KGB-surveillance routine," Nosenko always arrived at the meetings "snockered" and continued drinking heavily at the safe house.

Kisevalter explained the large number of apparent contradictions and misstatements in Nosenko's statements during the meetings (as reflected in the tape recordings, Bagley's and Kisevalter's notes, and Kisevalter's "transcriptions" of the tape recordings, which were made directly from Bagley's notes instead of from the tapes themselves) by attributing them to several factors. These included Nosenko's alleged drunkenness, the language difficulties between Bagley and Nosenko, Bagley's allegedly "mistake-filled" notes, and the allegedly poor quality of the tape recordings made during the meetings.

Bagley points out in his book Spy Wars that Nosenko never appeared to be drunk. He also notes that Nosenko could speak English well enough and that Bagley could understand Russian sufficiently for them to communicate satisfactorily during their one-on-one meeting (the first one). Furthermore, both Bagley and Kisevalter had taken notes during the four meetings they had with Nosenko. Bagley also clarifies that Abidian did not set up Penkovsky's dead drop. Penkovsky himself had set it up before being recruited by the CIA and MI6 in April 1961. Abidian only checked it in late December 1961 because the CIA mistakenly believed Penkovsky had signaled for it to be checked in a mysterious, somewhat-conforming-to-the-agreed-upon-format Christmas Eve phone call to the residence of an American Embassy employee.

== See also ==
- Rufus Taylor
- List of Eastern Bloc defectors
- List of KGB defectors

== Bibliography ==
- Bagley, Tennent H. (2007). Spy Wars: Moles, Mysteries, and Deadly Games. Yale University Press. ISBN 978-0-300-12198-8.
- Blum, Howard (2022). The Spy Who Knew Too Much. New York: HarperCollins Publishers Inc. ISBN 978-0-06-305423-3.
- Epstein, Edward Jay (1978). Legend : the secret world of Lee Harvey Oswald. New York: Reader's Digest Press : McGraw-Hill. ISBN 0-07-019539-0.
- Heuer, Richards (1987). "Nosenko: Five Paths to Judgment" (PDF). Studies in Intelligence. 31 (3): 71–101. Archived from the original (PDF) on April 12, 2023.
- Mangold, Tom (1992), Cold Warrior - James Jesus Angleton: The CIA's Master Spy Hunter (Reprint ed.), Touchstone Books
- Posner, Gerald L. (1993), Case Closed: Lee Harvey Oswald and the Assassination of JFK, Random House
- Robarge, David (September 2013). "DCI John McCone and the Assassination of President John F. Kennedy - The Nosenko Incubus" (PDF). Studies in Intelligence. 57 (3). CIA: 13–18. C06185413.
