= Yuri Krotkov =

Russian dramatist

Yuri Vasilevich Krotkov (Russian: Юрий Васильевич Кротков, 11 November 1917 – 26 December 1981) was a Soviet dramatist. Working as a KGB agent, he (allegedly) defected to the West in 1963.

== Biography ==
Born in Kutaisi, Georgia, Krotkov received his BA in literature from the University of Moscow. He worked for TASS and Radio Moscow. After World War II, he was an information officer in Berlin, Germany as a KGB agent. By 1956, he was a screenwriter in Moscow and still a KGB agent. He was selected as one of the principal agents in the seduction/compromise operation against Maurice Dejean, the French ambassador to the USSR, and his wife. Krotkov was tasked with seducing the wife while various women agents seduced the husband.

On 13 September 1963, feeling guilty for the suicide of French military attaché Louis Guibaud, which was driven by a similar seduction/compromise operation, he defected in London, England. In 1964, he vouched for Yuri Nosenko. His information led to the exposure of John Watkins. In 1969, he moved to the United States and became a novelist. He wrote I Am From Moscow (1967), The Red Monarch: Scenes From the Life of Stalin (1979), and The Nobel Prize (1980).

Nosenko's former CIA case officer, Tennent H. Bagley, who died in 2014, believed Nosenko and Krotkov were false defectors. Professor John M. Newman, author of the 1995/2008 book, "Oswald and the CIA," also believes Nosenko and Krotkov were false defectors, and that they cooperated with a KGB provocateur by the name of Alexandr Cherepanov to discredit true-defector Anatoliy Golitsyn and to prevent the CIA's uncovering a KGB "mole" by the name of Bruce Solie in CIA's mole-hunting Office of Security.

== Wilfred Burchett ==
In November 1969, Krotkov testified before the U.S. Senate Subcommittee on Internal Security that Wilfred Burchett had been his agent when he worked as a KGB controller. However, he also named, very implausibly, Jean-Paul Sartre and John Kenneth Galbraith as KGB agents, casting a great deal of doubt on his testimony. He claimed that Burchett had proposed a "special relationship" with the Soviets at their first meeting in Berlin in 1947. Krotkov also reported that Burchett had worked as an agent for both Vietnam and China and was a secret member of the Communist Party of Australia. For his part, Burchett critic Tibor Méray alleged that he was an undercover party member but not a KGB agent.

The returning dissident Vladimir Bukovsky was able to gain access to formerly secret documents in Moscow in 1992, and was able to copy them, including those concerning Burchett. According to communist propaganda expert Herbert Romerstein, these documents reveal that in July 1957 the KGB advised the Central Committee of the Communist Party that their agent Burchett had become Moscow correspondent of pro-communist newspaper National Guardian. As the newspaper could not afford to pay him a salary, KGB requested an immediate payment of 20,000 rubles and a monthly subsidy of 3000 rubles. Burchett resigned from National Guardian in 1979 when the newspaper took the side of Chinese and Cambodian communists against the Soviet and Vietnamese communists. Robert Manne gave a similar account in 2013. Manne writes: "Every detail in the KGB memorandum is consistent with the Washington testimony of Yuri Krotkov. It now turns out that he was not a liar and a perjurer, but a truth-teller." KGB archives indicate that in 1957 Burchett was receiving monetary compensation for his services as a journalist.

== See also ==
- List of Eastern Bloc defectors
