= Aleksey Kulak =

Soviet spy & diplomat (1922–1984)

Aleksey Isidorovich Kulak
- Born: 27 March 1922; Moscow
- Died: 25 August 1984 (aged 62); Moscow
- Burial place: Kuntsevo Cemetery
- Education: D. Mendeleev University of Chemical Technology
- Awards: Hero of the Soviet Union (1946); Order of Lenin (1946); Order of Alexander Nevsky (1945); Order of the Red Banner (twice); Order of the Red Star (twice); Medal "For the Defense of Leningrad"; Medal "For the Capture of Berlin"; Medal "For the Victory over Germany in the Great Patriotic War 1941–1945"
- Espionage activity
- Allegiance: Soviet Union, United States
- Agency: Red Army; KGB
- Active: 1941–1947 (Red Army); 1960–1977 (KGB)
- Rank: Colonel
- Codename: Fedora, CKKAYO

Aleksey Isidorovich Kulak (Russian: Алексей Исидорович Кулак; 27 March 1922 – 25 August 1984), code name FEDORA, was a KGB Colonel who offered his services to the FBI and CIA between 1962 and 1977. Kulak's assertion that there was a KGB mole within the FBI led to a decades-long mole hunt that seriously disrupted the agency. Kulak's information was taken seriously by American intelligence, but some have claimed that he was a KGB double agent meant to sow chaos within the FBI. Prior to his work in intelligence, Kulak was decorated as a Hero of the Soviet Union for his heroism as a Red Army officer on the Eastern Front. He was posthumously stripped of his awards and rank in 1990, five years after Aldrich Ames ostensibly revealed Kulak's betrayal.

== Early life and career ==
Aleksey Isidorovich Kulak was born on March 27, 1922 to Belarusian parents in Moscow. He was drafted into the Red Army in August 1941, and completed an accelerated artillery officer's training course in Odessa in 1942, after which he entered frontline service. By April 1945, he held the rank of Senior Lieutenant and was artillery battalion commander in the 5th Shock Army of the 1st Belorussian Front. He distinguished himself in the Battle of Berlin, providing artillery cover even after being wounded. For his heroism on the battlefield, he was awarded the title of Hero of the Soviet Union with the presentation of the Order of Lenin and Gold Star Medal on May 15, 1946. Kulak was awarded many other decorations for his wartime service.

After serving as a commandant during the occupation of Germany, Kulak was discharged from the Soviet Army into the reserves in 1947 with the rank of Captain. He went on to study chemistry at the D. Mendeleev University of Chemical Technology, receiving a Candidate of Chemical Sciences degree in 1953. After working as a chemist for some years, Kulak joined the KGB in 1960. He was sent by the KGB to New York City in the early 1960s, with a cover of being assigned as a consultant to the United Nations on the effects of radiation.

== Spying in New York ==
In March, 1962, Kulak walked into an FBI field office in New York City and offered his service to the FBI in exchange for cash. When asked whether he was worried about having been spotted walking into an FBI office, Kulak immediately offered a tantalizing clue that he knew of a mole in the FBI, telling agents that the KGB's agents were occupied meeting an FBI agent who was spying for the Soviet Union. Kulak referred to this unidentified FBI double-agent as "Dick". Kulak's information set off a decades-long mole hunt in the FBI.

It has never been conclusively determined whether or not there was a mole working in the FBI. It has also never been conclusively proven that Kulak's approach to the FBI was not a KGB feint to throw the FBI's counter-intelligence operation into disarray, which his revelation did achieve, as the agency spent significant resources investigating its own agents.

In 1963, Kulak switched his KGB cover to science attaché at the Soviet Embassy, and continued working there until 1967, when he returned to Moscow. In 1971, Kulak returned to New York for a second tour of duty which lasted until 1976. Although he had been considered a reliable source, by the end of his second tour, the FBI was beginning to suspect Kulak was secretly controlled by the KGB and was feeding false information to the Americans. Still, before he left New York City, he was recruited by Gus Hathaway, the CIA agent who handled Adolf Tolkachev, to continue his espionage work for the Americans upon his return to Moscow.

== Return to Moscow, death, and legacy ==
In 1977, back in Moscow and working as head of the research department at his alma mater, Kulak resumed contact with the CIA and provided a valuable list of Soviet scientists attempting to steal U.S. scientific secrets. He promised to provide even more valuable sets of data about the inner-most workings of the KGB and the Soviet Union's efforts to steal American technology. However, when he signaled to make contact with CIA agents, he got no response. CIA director Stansfield Turner had issued orders to the Moscow CIA station to halt contacts with undercover spies, out of fear the station had been compromised. Despite Kulak's attempts to signal for a meeting a second time, contact was never made and his offer of more material was never taken up.

A book by author Edward Jay Epstein published in 1978 described Fedora in enough detail to make it likely that the KGB was able to identify Kulak as the source. With his cover probably blown, the CIA offered to exfiltrate Kulak, devising an elaborate ruse to carry out what would have been a first-of-its-kind operation to pull a spy out of Moscow, but when Kulak was finally contacted, he politely thanked the CIA for its offer but declined, saying he was not concerned for his safety.

Kulak died from a malignant brain tumor on August 25, 1984. He was buried with full honors in Kuntsevo Cemetery.

Kulak's apparent treason was revealed to the KGB by Aldrich Ames upon the latter's defection in 1985. As a result, Kulak was posthumously stripped of the title of Hero of the USSR and all other decorations and ranks by Decree No. 590 of the President of the USSR on August 17, 1990. His ashes still rest in Kuntsevo under a monument identifying him as a Hero of the USSR, but have been a target for vandalism. On July 15, 2022 his gravestone was defaced with the word "Judas" and a note mentioning the revocation of his title.

== Questions about Kulak's loyalty ==
Due to the enormous amount of distrust and tumult within the ranks of the FBI inspired by Kulak's claims that a KGB mole was operating at the agency, questions have been raised about whether Kulak was an authentic source of information, or whether he was under the control of the KGB, deliberately feeding false information to the FBI. During his years of service, Kulak was considered a legitimate source by FBI director J. Edgar Hoover, but doubted by CIA's director of counter-intelligence James Angleton.

When Kulak approached the FBI, he was overweight and a heavy drinker. Often during his interviews with FBI agents, Kulak drank from a bottle of scotch, and his frequent inebriation has been cited as evidence that he was a genuine volunteer for the FBI. Besides providing information about a potential mole, Kulak gave the FBI details on Soviet agents, which led to the FBI making a number of arrests and imprisonments, adding to the sense that he was a genuine volunteer. Additionally, Kulak told the FBI that the KGB's mole in the agency had given the Soviets codes the Americans used in their counter-intelligence work, which would have been a major coup and a closely guarded secret for the Soviets, and which appears to have been true.

CIA counterintelligence officer Tennent H. Bagley, author John M. Newman, and author Edward J. Epstein have argued that one of the reasons the KGB may have sent Fedora to the FBI was to convince the Bureau and the CIA a few months later that Yuri Nosenko (who "walked in" to the CIA in Geneva, Switzerland, late May 1962 and physically defected to the U.S. in February 1964) was a true defector.

One argument made for Kulak's possibly being a KGB double-agent is that he avoided prosecution upon his return to Russia, unlike Dmitri Polyakov, who was executed when his work with the FBI was discovered by the KGB. In 1995, former KGB general Oleg Kalugin said in an interview that not only was Kulak an authentic source, but the KGB did indeed have a mole operating in the FBI at the height of the Cold War. Kalugin said that many in the KGB suspected Kulak of working for the Americans, but his status as a war hero, and recipient of the Hero of the USSR award, protected him.
