= List of KGB defectors =

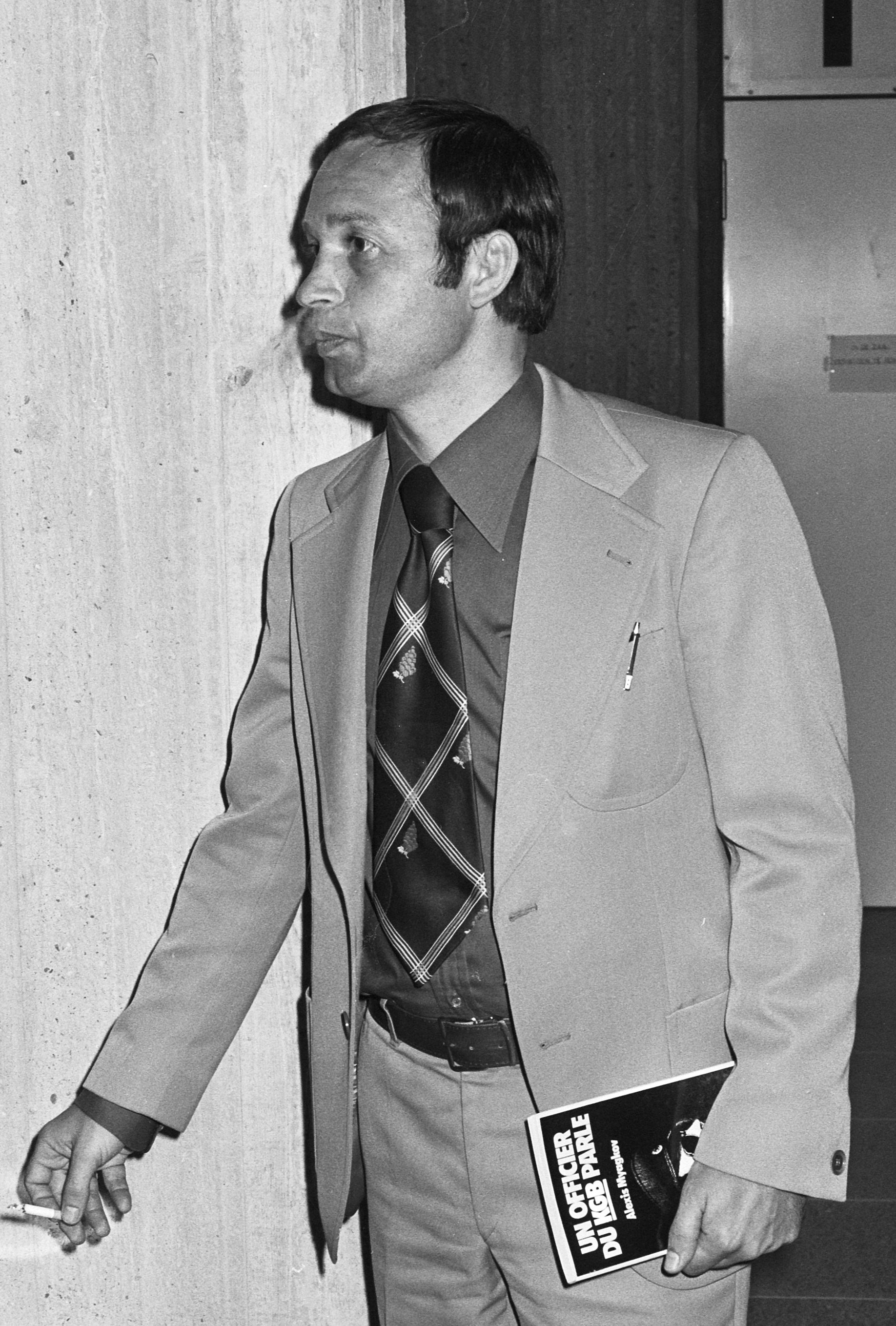
Aleksei Myagkov in 1977

During the Soviet era, hundreds of intelligence and state security officers defected to a foreign power. Their motivations varied, from fear of arrest, to dissatisfaction with the tasks assigned to them, to a change of heart about the regime they served.

While there were defections in the other direction too, the number from the Soviet Union and Soviet Bloc was significantly greater. This was particularly true of intelligence and state security personnel.

To defect, a Soviet officer needed to make contact with a foreign power. A Soviet officer had three ways to do that:

1. A defector could approach a foreign power while already outside the Soviet Union on official business, like diplomatic cover.
2. A defector could cross a border to a country neighboring the Soviet Union and request asylum.
3. Unique to World War II, when a foreign power—German troops—occupied large portions of Soviet territory, a defector could approach a foreign power that came to him or her. Intelligence and state security officer defectors used all three methods over the course of Soviet history.

Many Soviet intelligence and state security defectors are relatively obscure. Before World War II, Soviet officers often were discussed only in Europe-based Russian émigré newspapers. In the immediate aftermath of World War II, the United States and United Kingdom, which were the primary recipients of Soviet intelligence and state security officer defectors, did not publicize defections as broadly.

After Stalin’s death in 1953, intelligence and state security officer defectors became more prominent and were offered public forums, such as press conferences and publication venues to reveal their stories. That resulted in prominent defectors, like: Nikolay Khokhlov, Petr Deryabin, and Vladimir and Yevdokiya Petrov.

The rush of Soviet intelligence and state security officer defectors that followed Stalin’s death waned in the late 1950s, settling to a few per year until the Soviet regime was approaching its end in the 1980s. The late 1980s and early 1990s saw another wave of intelligence and state security officer defectors, as they became disgruntled with the tasks they were given to perform.

Although post-Soviet Russian laws changed, opening the opportunity to travel abroad freely, intelligence and state security officers still faced restrictions preventing them from traveling abroad. Thus, the defection of intelligence and state security officers has continued, even accelerating since Russia’s full-scale invasion of Ukraine in 2022.

The following is a list of Soviet (later, Russian) intelligence and state security officers and agents who have defected.

Name	Defection date	Country of defection	Comment
Petr Mikhailovich Karpov	August 1924	Weimar Republic	Also known as Mikhail Georgiyevich Sumarokov
Mikhail Yakovlevich Hendler	April 1926	Cuba	Immigrated to USA in about 1927
I. I. Kravets	August 1926	Iran	Moved directly to France
Stefens	August 1926	France	Also known as Ivan Vasilyevich Gavrilchenko
Yevgeniy Mikhailovich Kozhevnikov	May 1927	China	Also known as: Yevgeniy Pik, Hovans, Kluge
Ivan Nikitin	October 1927	Latvia	OGPU Border Guard intelligence officer
Yevgeniy Vasilyevich Dumbadze	June 1928	France	
Semen Aleksandrovich Bryantsev	January 1929	Weimar Republic	Defection questioned
Eduard Martinovich Miller	March 1930	Latvia	
Fedor Pavlovich Drugov	March 1930	Finland	Immigrated to France. Redefected, February 1934
Georgiy Sergeyevich Agabekov	June 1930	France	Real surname: Arutyunov. Disappeared around August 1937. Body never recovered.
Nikolay Ignatyevich Kiselev	June 1930	Finland	Surname sometimes rendered "Kiselev-Gromov"
Ignace Reiss	July 1937	France	Real name: Ignatiy Stanislavovich Poretskiy. Gunned down in Switzerland by an NKVD hit squad, on 4 September 1938
Walter Germanovich Krivitskiy	October 1937	France	Real name: Samuel Gershovich Ginzberg. Found dead in his hotel room, on 10 February 1941, with a gunshot wound to the temple. Suspected foul play
Iosif Vulfovich Volodarsky	April 1938	Canada	
Genrikh Samoilovich Lyushkov	June 1938	(Empire of Japan) Japan	Executed by Japan in 1945, to prevent his recapture by the Soviets
Aleksandr Mikhailovich Orlov	July 1938	United States	Real name: Leyba Lazerevich Feldbin
Lev Borisovich Helfand	July 1940	Italy United States	Immigrated to the United States
Aleksandr Yakovlevich Zhigunov	August 1941	Nazi Germany	
Ivan Georgiyevich Bessonov	August 1941	Nazi Germany	Repatriated, executed in 1950
Aleksandr Vladimirovich Anokhin	September 1941	Nazi Germany	Published the book "Школа Опричников" under the pen name Aleksandr Brazhnev
Ivan Matveyevich Grachev	September 1941	Nazi Germany	
Nikolay Fedorovich Lapin	October 1941	Nazi Germany	
Petr Vasilyevich Kashtanov	February 1942	Nazi Germany	
Lidiya Pavlovna Yesenina	October 1942	Nazi Germany	
Vyacheslav Pavlovich Artemyev	September 1943	Nazi Germany	
Boris Alekseyevich Morozov	September 1943	Nazi Germany	
Igor Grigoryevich Orlov	October 1943	Nazi Germany	Real surname: Kopatskiy. Re-recruited as Soviet agent in 1949
Aleksandr Fedorovich Chikalov	November 1943	Nazi Germany	Kidnapped (forcibly taken) to the Soviet Union in October 1949
Gasan Artemovich Arabadzhev	November 1943	Nazi Germany	
Viktor Andreyevich Kravchenko	April 1944	United States	Not an intelligence officer
Mikhail Dmitriyevich Mondich	August 1945	Allied-occupied Germany	
Konstantin Dmitriyevich Volkov	September 1945	Turkey	Offered to defect, but was caught after Kim Philby informed the NKVD
Michael Pines	December 1945	Allied-occupied Austria	
Sergey Naumovich Perlin	March 1946	Allied-occupied Germany	
Anatoliy Mikhailovich Granovskiy	September 1946	Sweden	Resettled in Brazil; later immigrated to the United States
Aleksandr Stepanovich Kravchenko	June 1947	United States	
Boris Ivanovich Baklanov	July 1947	Allied-occupied Austria United Kingdom	
Vasiliy Mikhailovich Sharandak	August 1947	Allied-occupied Austria	
(Aleksandr Nikolayevich?) Rebrov	1947	Allied-occupied Germany	
Simas Pečiulionis	April 1948	Allied-occupied Germany	
Aleksandr Nikolayevich Mikheyev	August 1948	Allied-occupied Germany	
Boris Kupriyanovich Gurzhiev	November 1948	Allied-occupied Germany	
Georgiy Ivanovich Samusev	December 1948	Allied-occupied Germany	
Olga Yakovlevna Bentsianovskaya	February 1949	Allied-occupied Germany United Kingdom	
Rafail Illych Goldfarb	July 1949	West Germany	
Nikolay Ivanovich Bondarev	July 1949	West Germany	
Ivan Matveyevich Grigoryev	October 1949	West Germany	
Georgiy Vasilyevich Salimanov	May 1950	West Germany	
Viktor Aleksandrovich Dubkov	November 1952	West Germany	Captured on the battlefield in 1943; withheld his intelligence affiliation until 1952
Grigoriy Stepanovich Burlutskiy	June 1953	Afghanistan	Immigrated to West Germany
Grigoriy Fedorovich Pavlov	August 1953	Norway	
Yevgeniy Vladimirovich Brik	November 1953	Canada	
Yuriy Aleksandrovich Rastvorov	January 1954	Japan	Brought to the United States
Petr Sergeyevich Deryabin	February 1954	Allied-occupied Austria	Brought to the United States
Nikolay Yevgenyevich Khokhlov	February 1954	West Germany	Immigrated to the United States. Victim of thallium poisoning in 1957. Survived
Vladimir Mikhaylovich Petrov	3 April 1954	Australia	Real name: Afanasiy Mikhailovich Shorokhov. Led to the Petrov Affair in Australia
Yevdokiya Alekseyevna Petrova	19 April 1954	Australia	Real name: Yevdokia Alexeyevna Kartseva. Led to the Petrov Affair in Australia
Lars Edvin Lindström	August 1954	Sweden	
Reino Häyhänen	March 1957	France	Died in a York, PA hospital. Rumors of his death in a suspicious auto accident are erroneous.
Anatoliy Mikhailovich Golitsyn	15 December 1961	Finland	
Bohdan Mykolayovych Stashynsky	August 1961	(Germany) West Berlin	
Yuri Vasilevich Krotkov	September 1963	United Kingdom	KGB agent, not an officer
Yuriy Ivanovich Nosenko	February 1964	Switzerland	Authenticity of defection disputed
Yuriy Aleksandrovich Bezmenov	February 1970	Canada	KGB co-optee, not an officer
Sergey Nikolayevich Kourdakov	4 September 1971	Canada	Intelligence agent, not an officer
Oleg Adolfovich Lyalin	September 1971	United Kingdom	
Aleksei Alekseyevich Myagkov	February 1974	(Germany) West Berlin	
Imants Lešinskis	September 1978	United States	
Stanislav Aleksandrovich Levchenko	October 1979	Japan	
Ilya Grigoryevich Dzhirkvelov	May 1980	Switzerland	
Viktor Ivanovich Sheymov	May 1980	United States	
Vladimir Anatolyevich Kuzichkin	June 1982	Iran	
Oleg Antonovich Gordievsky	19 July 1985	United Kingdom	Suspected poisoning in 2007. Survived
Vitaly Sergeyevich Yurchenko	August 1985	Italy	Disputed (later returned to USSR)
Oleg Agraniants	May 1986	Tunisia	
Igor Nikolayevich Cherpinskiy	April 1990	Belgium	
Sergey Sergeyevich Illarionov	February 1991	Italy	
Viktor Alekseyevich Oshchenko	July 1992	United Kingdom	
Vasiliy Nikitich Mitrokhin	September 1992	Latvia	
Aleksandr Nikolayevich Poteyev	26 June 2010	United States	KGB colonel, later SVR officer. Multiple assassination attempts

== See also ==
- List of Cold War pilot defections
- GRU
- List of Soviet and Eastern Bloc defectors
- Petrov Affair
- Soviet Defectors Database
