= Frank Gibney =

American journalist (1924–2006)

- Born: September 21, 1924; Scranton, Pennsylvania, U.S.
- Died: April 9, 2006 (aged 81); Santa Barbara, California, U.S.
- Occupations: Journalist, editor, writer, scholar

Frank Bray Gibney (September 21, 1924 – April 9, 2006) was an American journalist, editor, writer and scholar. He learned Japanese while in the US Navy during World War II and was later stationed in Japan. As a journalist in Tokyo, he wrote Five Gentlemen of Japan, a popular book about the Japanese that was welcomed for its humanism and for transcending the bitterness of war. A half dozen more books followed on Japan and East Asia. He also wrote on communism in Europe. At the Encyclopædia Britannica, he directed translations. He was also the founder of the Pacific Basin Institute.

== Life and career ==
Born in Scranton, Pennsylvania, Gibney came of age in New York City. The son of a restaurateur, he excelled in debate and was awarded a scholarship to Yale University. His education was interrupted by World War II, yet he was awarded a bachelor's degree in classics in absentia in 1945.

In the United States Navy, he studied at its elite Japanese Language School located in the University of Colorado. As an officer in naval intelligence, he was then stationed at Iroquois Point, near Pearl Harbor, where he interrogated Japanese prisoners-of-war, officers among them, and made daily use of his Japanese. In 1997, he wrote that in Hawaii, "I came to know the Japanese." After the war, he kept in touch with prisoners "through reunions at a sushi restaurant." For the American occupation, he was transferred to Japan. "I was a small human bridge between Gen. Douglas MacArthur's conquering army and a puzzled but receptive Japanese public."

A foreign correspondent for Time, Gibney also served as Tokyo bureau chief. He was an editorial writer at Life. He became a senior features editor at Newsweek. While his residence remained in Tokyo, covering Japan, Korea, and Southeast Asia, he also was sent on assignments to Europe. From his experience as a journalist, he began to publish a series of books, many on the Japanese. His first in 1953, Five Gentlemen of Japan, was widely acclaimed for its cross-cultural insight.

In the early 1960s, Gibney worked briefly for two magazines. He was editor for Show Business Illustrated and then became the publisher of the short-lived Show magazine, which focused on art and culture. Show is remembered, among other things, for "an undercover exposé of the Playboy bunny world by Gloria Steinem."

From 1966 to 1976, he worked in translations at Encyclopædia Britannica, and served as vice chairman of its Board of Editors. He was president of a joint venture between Britannica and Tokyo Broadcasting System. In 1976 the Japanese government, "for his work in cultural affairs," awarded him the Order of the Rising Sun, Third Class. A few years later, the Japanese government again celebrated his achievements with the Order of the Sacred Treasure, Second Class.

In 1979, Gibney founded the Pacific Basin Institute in Santa Barbara, California, which he led as president for over 20 years. It was affiliated with Pomona College, where he also was a professor. In 1997 the Institute moved to the Pomona campus. He helped to found and arrange for the institute to give substantial support to the Journal of American-East Asian Relations. In 2018 the Journal established the Frank Gibney Award, given for a graduate student essay in the field.

He is the father of Alex Gibney, an Academy Award-winning documentary film director and producer. Frank Gibney was interviewed in his son's controversial film about American forces in Afghanistan, Taxi to the Dark Side, which was released in 2007. Another son, James, is journalist, currently working as an editor at Bloomberg Opinion and has previously worked as a U.S. Foreign Service officer, as well as an editor at The New York Times and The Atlantic.

At the age of 81, on April 9, 2006, Frank Gibney died of congestive heart failure in Santa Barbara, California.

He was survived by his third wife of 34 years, Hiroko Doi, and seven children.

== Publications ==
=== Books on East Asia ===
Gibney wrote more than ten books and co-wrote several more, about half on East Asia. In his five volumes about Japan, there is much discussion of the Japanese economy and business practices that is placed in cultural context.

His debut book, Five Gentlemen of Japan (1953), was among the first to depict humanely the wartime enemy through portraits of a journalist, a naval officer, a steelworker, a farmer and Emperor Hirohito. The Los Angeles Times wrote that it "gave many Americans their first real understanding of a country that was widely viewed as dangerous and mysterious." "In profiling a farmer, a former vice admiral in the Imperial Navy, a newspaperman, the foreman of a steel mill and Emperor Hirohito, Gibney offered an intimate glimpse into postwar Japanese society." Elizabeth Gray Vining, a Quaker schoolteacher and former tutor of then Crown Prince Akihito, Hirohito's son, praised Gibney for his 1953 Five Gents book and its "keen and careful analysis" in a New York Times book review. "Their portraits are drawn with sympathy and insight; none of them is caricature," she wrote. That was "so distinct from films and other propaganda" produced during the recent, hard-fought War in the Pacific.

Japan: The Fragile Superpower, his 1975 book, described how traditional Japan survived in the way modern commerce is practiced. Gibney "contrasted American and Japanese cultural and business traditions."

His 1982 book Miracle by Design celebrates the Japanese work ethic and overall team spirit in economic endeavors. One critic, however, notes here the commonplace comparisons between Japanese and American businesses, observing that Gibney knows the field and has "earned the right to be unoriginal."

The Pacific Century on the rise of East Asia was published in 1992. It starts in the mid-19th century, surveys the social and economic history of the region, and highlights Japan. Adapted into a ten-part series of the same name on the Public Broadcasting Service, it received an Emmy Award and featured the author. The Pacific Basin Institute, founded and led by Frank Gibney, was a co-producer of the PBS series.

While at the Encyclopædia Britannica he directed its translation into Chinese, Korean, and Japanese. A Japanese translation of the Encyclopedia appeared in 1975. The 1986 Chinese edition was evidently the "first non-Marxist reference work allowed in China." It was a 6-year effort in 10 volumes. The edition dealt "gingerly" with "sensitive" subjects.

Korea's Quiet Revolution (1992) "draws on his long personal experience in Korea" and provides an analysis of the economic growth and the emerging democracy. He wrote of his experience covering the war in an article, especially the "haste, the unpreparedness, and the confusion of the first months of the war." His book offered brief survey of Korean history, the Korean War (1950–1953); the short-lived, democratic April Revolution of 1960 in South Korea (ROK); the extraordinary economic growth under the authoritarian rule of Park Chung Hee (1961–1979); the struggle for democracy, up to ROK President Roh Tae Woo (1988–1993). Two later chapters concern North Korea. An appendix presents three articles published in 1950, 1954, and 1977.

=== Books on communism ===
Gibney's 1959 book on Poland under communism, The Frozen Revolution, began after he had visited the country as a journalist in 1957. He had come to investigate what was called the "Polish October Revolution" of 1956. It was a half-successful transformation of government, being limited by Soviet insistence on a continuance of communist rule. Gibney shows how the result seriously subverted the "imperial Communist system" in central Europe and also in Russia. He discusses the late 1950s in Poland: the Communist Party and Wladyslaw Gomulka, intellectual life, the Catholic Church, and troubles in the planned economy. Also addressed are the former-German lands, the Jews of Poland, and Poland during World War II.

The Secret World, also published in 1959, described the Soviet secret police. Gibney co-authored it with Peter Deriabin who had defected from the Soviet NKVD in 1954. Deriabin subsequently worked for the CIA and occasionally testified before congressional committees. Apparently, the book had originated as Deriabin's autobiography, Tainy Mir.

Gibney in his 1961 book The Khrushchev Pattern appraised the Soviet leader's career since Stalin's death in 1952. "Gibney credits Khrushchev with pulling off a prodigious public relations trick in achieving throughout most of the world a new Madison Avenue-style 'public image' for a country whose very name was anathema before he came to power." Yet his "superficially reasonable tactics" were just a dangerous as Stalin's. An appendix reviewed the status of communist parties in the countries of the world.

Gibney contributed substantial commentary to The Penkovskiy Papers (1965). Oleg Penkovskiy was a colonel in the GRU (Soviet military intelligence). The book was based around English translations of classified Russian texts, which had previously been provided to American intelligence by Penkovskiy. It presents an insider's view of Soviet intelligence agencies and their trade craft. Its Russian author and source, after a publicized trial, had been executed by the Soviet government in 1963. This book and another co-written with Deriabin made use of material requested from the CIA.

=== Review of works ===
"The extraordinary thing about Frank is that he wrote a great book in the early 1950s and was still going strong 50 years later. He had a deep perspective that came from studying history and business and politics and was able to communicate it well to the public. I don't know anyone with the same combination of energy, upbeat attitude and humor [that] Frank had," commented Professor Ezra Vogel of Harvard University, his long time friend.

== Bibliography ==
Books

- Five Gentlemen of Japan: The Portrait of a Nation's Character (1953, reprint 2002)
- The Frozen Revolution: Poland. A study in Communist decay (1959)
- The Operators (1960) [about American white collar crime]
- The Khrushchev Pattern. Coexistence and its working through international communism (1961)
- Japan: The Fragile Super Power (1975, 3d ed. rev'd 1996)
- Miracle By Design. The real reason behind Japan's economic success (1982)
- The Pacific Century: America and Asia in a Changing World (1992)
- Korea's Quiet Revolution: From Garrison State to Democracy (1992)

Articles

- Gibney, Frank (1993). "The First Three Months of War: A Journalist's Reminiscences of Korea". Journal of American-East Asian Relations. 2: 101–110. doi:10.1163/187656193x00103.

Co-Author

- Peter Deriabin and Frank Gibney, The Secret World (1959)
- Oleg Penkovskiy with Frank Gibney, The Penkovskiy Papers (1965)

Editor

- Hiromichi Yahara, Battle for Okinawa (1973; English translation 1995).
- Frank Gibney, editor, Unlocking the Bureaucrat's Kingdom: Deregulating the Japanese Economy (1998).
- Katsuichi Honda, The Nanjing massacre: a Japanese journalist confronts Japan's national shame (1999), M.E. Sharpe, ISBN 0765603357
- Frank Gibney and Beth Cary, editors, Senso: The Japanese remember the Pacific War (2006).
