= Tennent H. Bagley =

CIA officer from 1950 to 1972

- Born: Tennent H. Bagley; November 11, 1925; Annapolis, Maryland, US
- Died: February 2, 2014 (aged 88); Brussels, Belgium
- Education: University of Southern California, Princeton University, Geneva Graduate Institute of International Studies
- Occupation: CIA officer
- Known for: Yuri Nosenko case
- Spouse: Marie Louise Harrington Bagley
- Children: 3
- Parent: David W. Bagley
- Awards: Distinguished Intelligence Medal
- Espionage activity
- Allegiance: United States
- Agency: Central Intelligence Agency
- Service years: 1950–1972

Tennent Harrington "Pete" Bagley (November 11, 1925 – February 20, 2014) was a CIA operations and counterintelligence officer who worked against the KGB during the Cold War. He is best known for having been, from June 1962 to August 1967, the principal case officer and interrogator of controversial KGB defector Yuri Nosenko, who claimed a couple of months after the assassination of President John F. Kennedy that the KGB had nothing to do with the accused assassin, Lee Harvey Oswald, during the two-and-a-half years he lived in the USSR.

== Early life and education ==
Bagley was born November 11, 1925, in Annapolis, Maryland to a prominent United States Navy family. His parents were then-Commander David W. Bagley and his wife, Marie Louise (Harrington) Bagley. He had two siblings, David H. Bagley and Worth H. Bagley, both of whom were older than him and destined to become Admirals. His great uncle was Fleet Admiral William D. Leahy. Tennent was given the nickname "Pete" by his mother when he was young, and it stuck with him for the rest of his life. Bagley joined the United States Marine Corps in 1942 when he was seventeen and studying at the University of Southern California. He went through the V-12 Navy College Training Program, and during WW II served as a lieutenant in a Marine detachment on an aircraft carrier. After the war, he earned a PhD in political science from the University of Geneva-affiliated Graduate Institute of International Studies. Bagley joined the CIA in 1950, and his first posting was to the CIA station in Vienna, Austria.

== Career ==
While posted in Vienna, Austria, Bagley helped the CIA recruit GRU Colonel Pyotr Semyonovich Popov, and he helped operations chief William J. Hood exfiltrate KGB Major Peter Deriabin to the U.S. After Vienna, Bagley was posted to the American Embassy in Bern, Switzerland, from where he ran a CIA program that specialized in recruiting Soviet intelligence officers, diplomats and functionaries in Europe. While in Bern, he was in communication with Polish KGB officer Michael Goleniewski, and helped him defect to the U.S. in January 1961. In his 1978 sworn testimony given to the United States House Select Committee on Assassinations (HSCA), Bagley said he became Chief of CIA's Soviet Russia Division's Counterintelligence section in 1962 and later became Deputy Chief (DC) of the Soviet Bloc Division. In 1967, when it was time for him to be transferred to a post in Europe, he chose to be sent to Brussels, Belgium. He was Chief of Station in Brussels until he chose early retirement in 1972.

=== Bagley's Analysis of the KGB-CIA War ===
Based on his own analyses and those of the Soviet Russia Division, the Counterintelligence Staff, and KGB defectors Peter Deriabin and Anatoliy Golitsyn and others, Bagley became convinced by the time he retired from the Agency that the CIA and the FBI had been seriously penetrated by Soviet intelligence. He was certain that Pyotr Semyonovich Popov had been betrayed in early 1957 by one or two never-uncovered “moles” in the CIA, and that Oleg Penkovsky had been betrayed within two weeks of his CIA and MI6 recruitment. He was sure that two Soviet intelligence officers who had volunteered to spy for the FBI's NYC field office in the early 1960s -- Aleksei Kulak Fedora (KGB agent) and Dmitri Polyakov) -- were Kremlin-loyal triple agents. Most importantly, Bagley was convinced that KGB defector Yuri Nosenko had been sent to the CIA in Geneva in 1962 to discredit what a recent defector, KGB Major Anatoliy Golitsyn, was telling CIA's Chief of Counterintelligence James Angleton about possible penetrations of US Intelligence and the intelligence services of America's NATO allies. Bagley was also convinced that KGB Major Igor Kochnov (aka Igor Kozlov) was dispatched to the CIA in 1966 to boost Nosenko's bona fides, to protect the moles from being uncovered, and to arrange for the eventual kidnapping of Nicholas Shadrin in Vienna in 1975. In 1994, Bagley befriended former KGB General Sergey Kondrashev who informed him that Polyakov had been arrested and executed in the 1980s because he had started telling the CIA more than he was supposed to. Bagley writes in his 2014 article "Ghosts of the Spy Wars" that he also learned from Kondrashev that the KGB had recruited in 1949 a never-uncovered U.S. Army code clerk, "JACK," whom Bagley says may have unintentionally started the Korean War.

=== His Involvement with Nosenko ===
Yuri Nosenko was a putative KGB officer who "walked in" to the CIA in Geneva in late May, 1962, and in a one-on-one meeting with Bagley in a "safe house" two days later, offered to sell some KGB secrets for $250 worth of "desperately needed" Swiss francs. Two days later, Russia-born CIA officer George Kisevalter flew in from the U.S. to help Russian-speaking Bagley interview Nosenko during four more meetings. According to Bagley (who immediately became Nosenko's primary CIA case officer), one of the things Nosenko told Kisevalter and himself during the second meeting was that CIA's spy, GRU Colonel Pyotr Semyonovich Popov, had been uncovered by KGB surveillance in 1959 when an American diplomat by the name of George Winters was spotted mailing a letter to him. Nosenko also told Bagley and Kisevalter that the KGB had developed special chemicals which allowed it to track people and letters. Bagley initially believed Nosenko was a true defector after meeting with him five times in Geneva, Switzerland, in May and June 1962, but, while reading the file of an earlier defector at CIA headquarters about a week later, he became convinced that Nosenko had been dispatched to the CIA to discredit what that earlier defector, Anatoliy Golitsyn, had told James Angleton six months before. Bagley realized that what Nosenko had told himself and Kisevalter in Geneva had strangely overlapped (and contradicted) the same cases that Golitsyn had told Angleton about even though Nosenko claimed to have worked in a different part of the highly compartmentalized KGB than Golitsyn.

Although Bagley, his boss David E. Murphy, James Angleton and Richard Helms and others in the CIA were skeptical of Nosenko's "bona fides," he was permitted to physically defect to the U.S. when he re-contacted Bagley and Kisevalter in Geneva in early February, 1964, and told them that he had been Lee Harvey Oswald's KGB case officer during the two-and-one-half years Oswald lived in the USSR. Nosenko told Bagley and Kisevalter that he urgently needed to physically defect to the U.S. because he had just received a telegram from KGB headquarters in Moscow ordering him to return there immediately (NSA looked into this issue a later and determined that such a telegram had never been sent.) Bagley, not letting on that he believed Nosenko to be a false defector, took him on a two-week vacation to Hawaii about a month after Nosenko arrived in the United States. When they returned to Washington, Nosenko, who had not been cooperating with his CIA interviewers, was incarcerated in a Washington, D. C. "safe house" at the direction of the head of CIA's Soviet Bloc Division, David Murphy, with input from Bagley. Although Murphy and Bagley detained Nosenko for three years in that safe house and in a new, purpose-built building in another location, they were unable to get him to confess to being a false defector. Nosenko was eventually moved by Bruce Solie in the Office of Security to a more comfortable safe house in 1967, "cleared" in October 1968 by Solie via what Bagley called a bogus polygraph exam and a specious report, released-with-supervision in 1969, resettled as an American citizen under a different name (George M. Rosnek), financially compensated for his troubles, and employed as a consultant and lecturer by the agency. Bagley wrote that during his incarceration, Nosenko had been subjected to polygraph exams, harsh (but not tortuous) interrogation sessions, a minimal-but-adequate diet, and Spartan living conditions. Bagley claims in his book "Spy Wars" that during his three-year detainment, Nosenko often contradicted what he had said both in Geneva in 1962 and after his arrival in the U.S. in February 1964, and that when Nosenko was confronted with a particular contradiction which had a bearing on his "legend," he fell into a trance-like state and, while being secretly tape recorded, mumbled to himself ...

If I admit that I wasn't watching [Embassy security officer John] Abidian, then I'd have to admit that I'm not George [Yuri], that I wasn't born in Nikolayev, and that I'm not married.

==== The "Zepp" Incident ====
Nosenko volunteered to Bagley and Kisevalter in June 1962 that the KGB had developed such high-quality listening devices that an electronic "bug" built into an ashtray or a vase was able to record very clearly a conversation in a Moscow restaurant allegedly between an American Assistant Naval Attaché (Leo J. Dulacki) and an Indonesian military attaché by the name of "Zepp" — a name Bagley didn't know, but had the presence of mind to have Nosenko spell out for him. This incident became critically important later when it was learned that Oleg Penkovsky's Moscow handler, Greville Wynne, had told his British de-briefer after he was released from a Soviet prison that, while incarcerated, the KGB had asked him who "Zepp" was. Bagley learned that when Wynne's KGB interrogator played the Penkovsky-Wynne conversation back to him to "jog his memory," Penkovsky realized that they had been recorded while talking about a London bargirl whose nickname was "Zeph" (short for "Stephanie"), just two weeks after Penkovsky had been recruited by the CIA and MI6 in London. This signified to Bagley that the KGB had become aware of Penkovsky's treason almost immediately, that the reason it had waited sixteen months to arrest him was because it needed to create a surveillance-based entrapment scenario that wouldn't lead to the uncovering of the highly placed, easy-to-identify mole who had betrayed him, and that in June 1962 Nosenko was "fishing" for the identity of the (nonexistent) mole "Zepp" in Soviet intelligence.

=== Lee Harvey Oswald ===
British researcher Malcolm J. J. Blunt befriended Bagley in 2008 and showed him some CIA documents he hadn't been privy to in 1959-1960. Some of them indicated that the incoming non-CIA cables on Lee Harvey Oswald's October 1959 defection to the USSR had been routed to Bruce Leonard Solie's mole-hunting office in the Office of Security rather than to where they would normally go, the Soviet Russia Division. Since this change in routing had to be arranged in advance with the Mail Integration Division and the Office of Mail Logistics, Bagley told Blunt that Oswald must have been a "witting" (i.e., false) defector.

=== Popov Case ===
GRU Colonel Pyotr Semyonovich Popov was recruited by the CIA in 1953 in Vienna and spied for the Agency for six years in Austria and East Germany. Bagley wrote in Spy Wars: Moles, Mysteries and Deadly Games, that Popov's treason was revealed to the KGB in early 1957 by his former CIA "dead drop" arranger in Moscow (and future Hoover Institution scholar), Edward Ellis Smith, when Smith met with the KGB officer who had recruited him in Moscow, Vladislav Kovshuk, in Washington D.C. movie houses. Bagley wrote that Smith had been "honey trapped" and recruited by Kovshuk in 1956, and that he was fired because he belatedly told the American Ambassador, Charles E. Bohlen, about the entrapment and how he had allegedly refused to work for the KGB. Ostensible KGB defector Yuri Nosenko voluntarily explained to Bagley in June 1962 why Kovshuk had gone to Washington ("for a couple of weeks") -- to recontact "the most important American intelligence officer the KGB had ever recruited in Moscow," a cipher machine mechanic codenamed "Andrey." (Kovshuk actually stayed in the D.C. area for ten months, working under the diplomatic cover of an ostensible two-year posting at the Soviet Embassy, and didn't meet with "Andrey" until just before he returned to Moscow and his regular KGB position). Nosenko also told both Bagley and Kisevalter at another meeting that he had personally participated in the honey-trapping and the "unsuccessful recruitment" of Smith. In his 2014 article, "Ghosts of the Spy Wars," Bagley points out that since Smith had lost access to CIA secrets five years earlier, it's implausible that the KGB sent Nosenko to the CIA in June 1962 only to obfuscate Kovshuk's recontacting him in 1957. Bagley speculated that Kovshuk may have recruited another, never-uncovered, mole with the help of Smith and that it was this still-active "mole" the KGB was trying to hide in 1962. Most importantly, Bagley wrote in Spy Wars that the KGB, in the interest of protecting Smith and the never-uncovered "mole," allowed Popov to continue spying for the CIA until late 1958, at which time (after Oleg Penkovsky had been "trapped like a bear in its den") he was recalled to Moscow on a ruse, secretly arrested and played back against the CIA for a year, finally publicly arrested on 16 October 1959 (the same day Oswald arrived in Moscow), and executed in 1960.

=== Michael Golienewski ===
In April 1958, a Polish intelligence major by the name of Michal Goleniewski, writing in German and calling himself Heckenschütze (Sniper), tried to warn J. Edgar Hoover about some possible KGB penetrations of U.S. Intelligence by having the American Embassy in Bern, Switzerland, forward to him a sealed letter he had written. Golienewski had decided to send the letter to Hoover rather than the CIA because he believed the Agency had been penetrated by at least one unknown-to-him KGB "mole" who might be able to uncover him. The U.S. Ambassador to Switzerland, Henry J. Taylor, opened and read the letter and decided not to forward it to Hoover but to turn it over to Bagley who was working "under cover" at the Embassy as Second Secretary. Bagley notified CIA headquarters about "Sniper," and then, pretending to be an FBI agent, started corresponding with him in German. They exchanged several letters, and about a year later, Bagley was instrumental in recruiting, debriefing, and exfiltrating Golienewski to the U.S.

A few years later, Bagley himself came under suspicion of being a KGB "mole" by Counterintelligence analyst Clare Edward Petty due to something Golienewski had written in one of his letters. Petty eventually discontinued this investigation and switched his attention to his own boss, CIA's Chief of Counterintelligence, James Angleton.

=== Bruce Solie ===
Bagley wrote scathingly about CIA officer Bruce Solie in Spy Wars. He excoriated Solie for having "cleared" Nosenko and for doing other things that damaged the CIA, but did not accuse him of being a "mole." In his 2022 book, Uncovering Popov's Mole (which he dedicated to Bagley), former high-level Army Intelligence analyst and NSA officer John M. Newman says he was not only probably a KGB mole, but that he had very likely sent or duped James Angleton into sending Lee Harvey Oswald to Moscow in 1959 as an ostensible "dangle" in a planned-to-fail hunt for "Popov's Mole" -- Solie -- in the wrong part of the CIA -- the Soviet Russia Division. Newman's colleague, Malcolm Blunt, has said that when he showed Bagley some documents indicating that Solie had tried, in April 1964, to convince the Warren Commission's W. David Slawson into believing Nosenko was a true defector and letting him testify to the Commission just two months after the CIA had begun to seriously interrogate him, Bagley, himself, started believing that Solie might have been a "mole."

=== KITTY HAWK / Shadrin Case ===
In "Spy Wars," Bagley relates that KGB Colonel Igor Kochnov, codenamed KITTY HAWK, contacted Richard Helms in 1966 and offered to spy-in-place for the CIA on condition that he be allowed to ostensibly recruit a previous defector, Nicholas Shadrin, in order to bolster his own status with the KGB and thereby be promoted to a higher position. Angleton and Helms believed Kochnov was a KGB provocation and decided to "play him back" against the Soviets without telling the FBI they were doing so. Deputy Director of CIA Stansfield Turner talked Shadrin into going along with the ruse. Having been convinced by Bruce Solie in the Office of Security that the Soviet Bloc Division had been penetrated by the KGB, Angleton and Helms chose Solie and Elbert Turner of the FBI to handle Kochnov. Six years later, Shadrin was kidnapped in Vienna by the KGB when his then-current handlers, Leonard V. McCoy and Cynthia Haussman, ignored Angleton's admonition to not let Shadrin travel outside the U.S., and failed to provide countersurveillance for Shadrin's meetings with Kochnov in the Austrian capitol.

=== John L. Hart's HSCA testimony ===
On September 11, 1978, CIA officer John L. Hart, who had written a pro-Nosenko / anti-Bagley report for the CIA regarding the bona fides of KGB defector Yuri Nosenko, testified to the HSCA. Nosenko, who had himself recently testified to the HSCA, claimed to have been in charge of Lee Harvey Oswald's KGB file before and after the assassination of President Kennedy, and said that the KGB had had absolutely nothing to do with "abnormal" Oswald in the USSR. In his testimony, Hart claimed Nosenko was a true defector and that he had been misunderstood, mishandled and mistreated by Bagley and his Soviet Bloc Division colleagues before and during his three-year incarceration. On October 11, 1978, Bagley sent a 40-page letter to G. Robert Blakey, chief counsel and staff director to the HSCA, in which he forcefully rebutted Hart's testimony and requested permission to testify to the Committee. In the additional 130 pages of oral testimony Bagley gave to the HSCA on 16 November 1978, he isn't identified by name but is referred to as "Mr. D.C.," as in Deputy Chief (of CIA's Soviet Bloc Division).

== Reactions to Spy Wars ==
Several reviews and analyses, both positive and negative, have been published either online or in hard-copy about Bagley's 2007 Yale University Press book, Spy Wars: Moles, Mysteries, and Deadly Games. Some positive reviews are those by David Ignatius, Ron Rosenbaum, Evan Thomas, and former CIA officer W. Alan Messer. Some negative reviews of Spy Wars are those by former Soviet intelligence officers Boris Volodarsky and Oleg Gordievsky, and former CIA officers Leonard V. McCoy, Cleveland Cram, and Richards Heuer in his 1987 essay, "Nosenko: Five Paths to Judgement".

== In popular culture ==
In his 1982 book about the Popov case, Mole: The True Story of the First Russian Intelligence Officer Recruited by the CIA, Hood protected the identities of himself, agent-handler George Kisevalter, and Bagley by changing their names to "Peter Todd," "Gregory Domnin" and "Amos Booth," respectively.

In the 1986 American–British television drama produced by the BBC, "Yuri Nosenko: Double Agent," Bagley's character is played by Tommy Lee Jones.

Bagley's 2007 book, Spy Wars: Moles, Mysteries and Deadly Games, is free-to-read on the Internet, as is his 2014 follow-up PDF, "Ghosts of the Spy Wars: A Personal Reminder to Interested Parties".

== Personal life ==
Bagley married a young Hungarian woman, Maria Lonyay in the early 1950s in Vienna. They moved from the U.S. to Brussels, Belgium, when Bagley was transferred there in 1972, and remained there after he retired from the CIA. They had three children, Andrew, Christina, and Patricia. Bagley wrote or co-wrote three books on the CIA and the KGB. He was a student of the Battle of Waterloo and an avid bird watcher.

== Bibliography ==
- Ancell, Robert M (January 1981), "The Path to Four Stars", Proceedings, United States Naval Institute: 48 – via Wikimedia commons, "The Bagleys, Worth H. (left) and David H., are the only brothers ever to attain four-star rank in the Navy. Worth's path to four stars led to a clash of wills between his friend, CNO Elmo Zumwalt, and Navy Secretary John Warner"
- Ashley, Clarence (2004), CIA Spy Master, Pelican Publishing Company
- Bagley, Tennent H. (1990), KGB: Masters of the Soviet Union (with coauthor Pyotr Deriabin), Hippocrene Books
- Bagley, Tennent H. (2007), Spy Wars: Moles, Mysteries, and Deadly Games, Yale University Press – via Internet Archive
- Bagley, Tennent H. (2013), Spymaster: Startling Cold War Revelations of a Soviet KGB Chief, Skyhorse Publishing
- Bagley, Tennent H. (January 2, 2015), "Ghosts of the Spy Wars: A Personal Reminder to Interested Parties", International Journal of Intelligence and CounterIntelligence, 28 (1): 1–37, doi:10.1080/08850607.2014.962362, ISSN 0885-0607
- Blum, Howard (2022), The Spy Who Knew Too Much, Harper
- Central Intelligence Agency (January 21, 2011), A Look Back ... CIA Asset Pyotr Popov Arrested, archived from the original on May 25, 2011
- Cornwell, Rupert (March 5, 2014), "Tennent Bagley: CIA agent at the heart of the controversial defection", The Independent
- Cram, Cleveland C. (October 1993), Of Moles and Molehunters: A Review of Counterintelligence Literature, 1977-92 (PDF), DIANE Publishing, ISBN 978-0-7881-1642-1, archived from the original on June 6, 2024
- Duns, Jeremy (2013), Dead Drop: The True Story of Oleg Penkovsky and the Cold War's Most Dangerous Operation, Simon & Schuster
- Epstein, Edward Jay (May 28, 1977), "Diary entry - Bagley", www.edwardjayepstein.com
- Epstein, Edward J. (1978), Legend: The Secret World of Lee Harvey Oswald, McGraw-Hill Book Company
- Heuer, Richards J., Jr. (Fall 1987). "Nosenko: Five Paths to Judgment" (PDF). Studies in Intelligence. 31 (3): 71–101. Archived from the original (PDF) on April 12, 2023.
- Hood, William (1982), Mole: The True Story of the First Russian Intelligence Officer Recruited By the CIA, W. W. Norton & Company
- Ignatius, David (April 11, 2007), "David Ignatius - A Ghost of the Cold War", The Washington Post, ISSN 0190-8286
- International Spy Museum (2023), Language of Espionage
- Ironbark Inc (December 3, 2013), Book Commentary: Spy Wars: Moles, Mysteries, and Deadly Games
- Klehr, Harvey (August 16, 2022), "A Spy Story Too Juicy to Be True?", Commentary Magazine
- Langer, Emily (February 24, 2014), "Tennent H. 'Pete' Bagley, noted CIA officer, dies at 88", Washington Post, ISSN 0190-8286
- Mangold, Tom (1991), Cold Warrior: James Jesus Angleton: The CIA's Master Spy Hunter, Simon & Schuster
- Martin, Douglas (March 3, 2014), "Tennent H. Bagley, Who Aided, Then Mistrusted a Soviet Spy, Dies at 88", The New York Times, ISSN 0362-4331
- Messer, Alan (2013), "In Pursuit of the Squared Circle: The Nosenko Theories Revisited", International Journal of Intelligence and CounterIntelligence, 26 (3): 427–452, doi:10.1080/08850607.2013.757994, archived from the original on April 9, 2023
- Newman, John M. (2008), Oswald and the CIA: The Documented Truth About the Unknown Relationship Between the U.S. Government and the Alleged killer of JFK, Skyhorse Publishing
- Newman, John M. (2022), Uncovering Popov's Mole, Self Published, ISBN 9798355050771, LCCN 2022917923
- Riebling, Mark (1994), Wedge: The Secret War Between the FBI and CIA, Alfred A. Knopf, ISBN 0-679-41471-1
- Robarge, David (September 2013), "DCI John McCone and the Assassination of John F. Kennedy" (PDF), Studies in Intelligence, 57 (3)
- Rosenbaum, Ron (February 12, 2007), "The Spy Who Came in From Geneva: Nosenko, the K.G.B. Defector", Observer
- Select Committee on Assassinations (March 1979), "Appendix to hearings before the Select Committee on assassinations", www.maryferrell.org
- Tate, Tim (2021), Agent Sniper, St. Martin's Press, New York
- Telegraph, London (March 7, 2014), "CIA espionage expert leaves one of the Cold War's greatest mysteries unresolved", The Sydney Morning Herald
- Thomas, Evan (June 3, 2007), "The Tangled Web", The New York Times, ISSN 0362-4331
- Trento, Joseph (1979), Widows, Crown Publishers, Inc
- Volodarsky, Boris; Gordievsky, Oleg (May 19, 2007), "Untangling the web of deception", The Spectator
- Weiner, Tim (2007), Legacy of Ashes, Doubleday
- Wise, David (1992), Molehunt, Random House
