= Nicholas Shadrin =

Soviet naval officer and defector

Nikolai Fedorovich Artamonov
- Born: 1922; Leningrad, Soviet Union
- Died: December 1975 (aged 52–53); Vienna, Austria
- Other name: Nicholas George Shadrin
- Occupation: Naval officer
- Known for: double agent

Nicholas George Shadrin, born Nikolai Fedorovich Artamonov (1922 – December 1975), was a Soviet naval officer serving in Gdynia, Poland who defected to the United States of America in 1959.

== Life ==
Shadrin was born in the Soviet Union in 1922. After joining the Soviet Navy he received advanced training in nuclear missiles, and at the age of 27 became the youngest destroyer captain in the fleet. Stationed in Gdynia, Poland in 1959, he fell in love with a Polish woman, Ewa Gora. With Navy restrictions and Gora's family's anti-communism making marriage impossible, the two defected by commandeering a naval launch to Sweden. The Central Intelligence Agency then brought Shadrin and Gora to the United States.

Shadrin's information proved particularly useful to the Office of Naval Intelligence. Working with the ONI under new identities, Shadrin gained an MA and PhD in engineering, and Gora opened a dental practice. He completed a Ph.D at George Washington University on the "Development of Soviet Maritime Power" in 1972. Later, with ONI not granting Shadrin higher level security clearances, he was assigned to translation in the Defense Intelligence Agency.

Shadrin was engaged in various counter-intelligence assignments during the Cold War after being approached by the KGB in 1966. He disappeared on assignment in Vienna, Austria in December 1975, apparently kidnapped by KGB agents. Later, Oleg Kalugin stated that Shadrin had died an accidental death during the kidnapping, apparently of a heart attack.

According to former CIA counterintelligence officer Tennent H. Bagley, James Angleton had warned Shadrin's American handlers, CIA officer Bruce Solie and FBI agent Elbert Turner, to not let him travel out of the United States, but they allowed him to go to Canada in 1971 to meet with the KGB and let him travel to Vienna, Austria, in December 1975 to meet with his KGB recruiter, Igor Kochnov.

== See also ==
- List of Eastern Bloc defectors
