= George Kisevalter =

CIA officer (1910–1997)

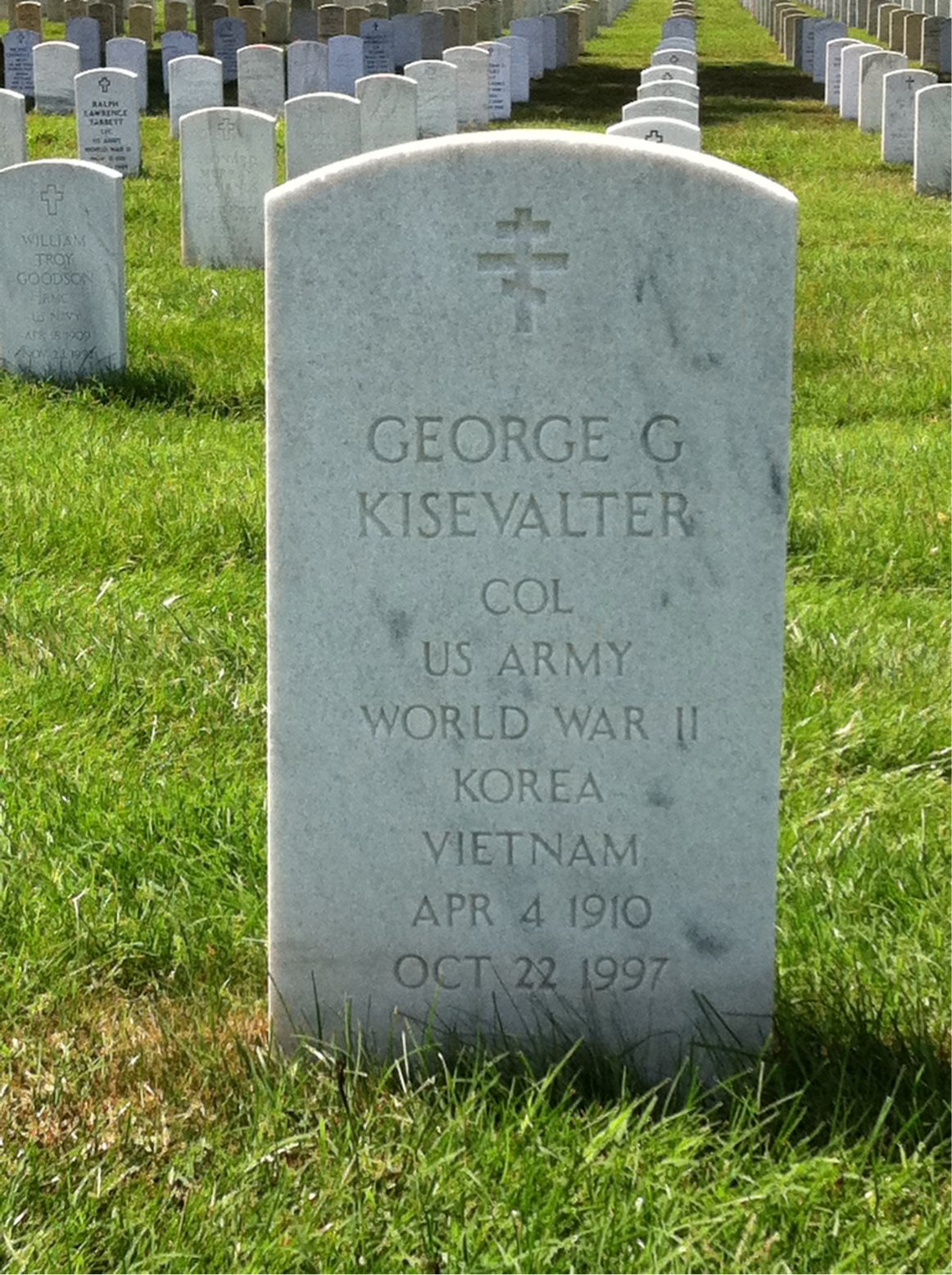
- Grave at Arlington National Cemetery
- Born: April 4, 1910; St. Petersburg, Russian Empire
- Died: October 1, 1997 (aged 87)
- Resting place: Arlington National Cemetery
- Occupation: CIA Operations Officer

George Kisevalter (April 4, 1910 – October 1, 1997) was an American operations officer of the CIA, who handled Major Pyotr Popov, the first Soviet GRU officer run by the CIA. He had some involvement with Soviet intelligence Colonel Oleg Penkovsky, active in the 1960s, who had more direct relations with British MI-6.

== Early life ==
Kisevalter was born on 4 April 1910, in St. Petersburg, Russian Empire, the son of an Imperial Russian Army munitions expert and his wife, and grandson of a Russian deputy finance minister.

In 1915, Kisevalter's father, accompanied by his family, was sent to the United States in order to purchase weapons for the Russian military. They were still out of the Russian Empire on this extensive trip when the Bolshevik Revolution occurred two years later. The Kisevalters remained in the United States. There they eventually became naturalized and settled in New York City, where there developed a sizeable Russian emigre community. The young George attended Stuyvesant High School.

== Education ==
In 1926 Kisevalter attended Dartmouth College to study engineering. Among his classmates was Nelson Rockefeller.

== Military and civilian careers pre-CIA ==
Kisevalter spent much of World War II as an army officer stationed in Alaska, involved in supporting the Soviet war effort through the Lend-Lease program. His first experience with intelligence came in 1944 when, as a fluent Russian speaker, he was assigned to military intelligence in order to work on Soviet intelligence projects. Due to Kisevalter's growing expertise in Soviet matters, as well as his German language skill, he was one of the officers who interviewed Major General Reinhard Gehlen, after Gehlen had surrendered to the US military. Gehlen had been Nazi Germany's chief of intelligence for the Eastern Front, and was also well versed in Soviet military and political affairs.

Kisevalter had a brief civilian agricultural career before joining the CIA.

== Central Intelligence Agency ==
=== Pyotr Popov ===
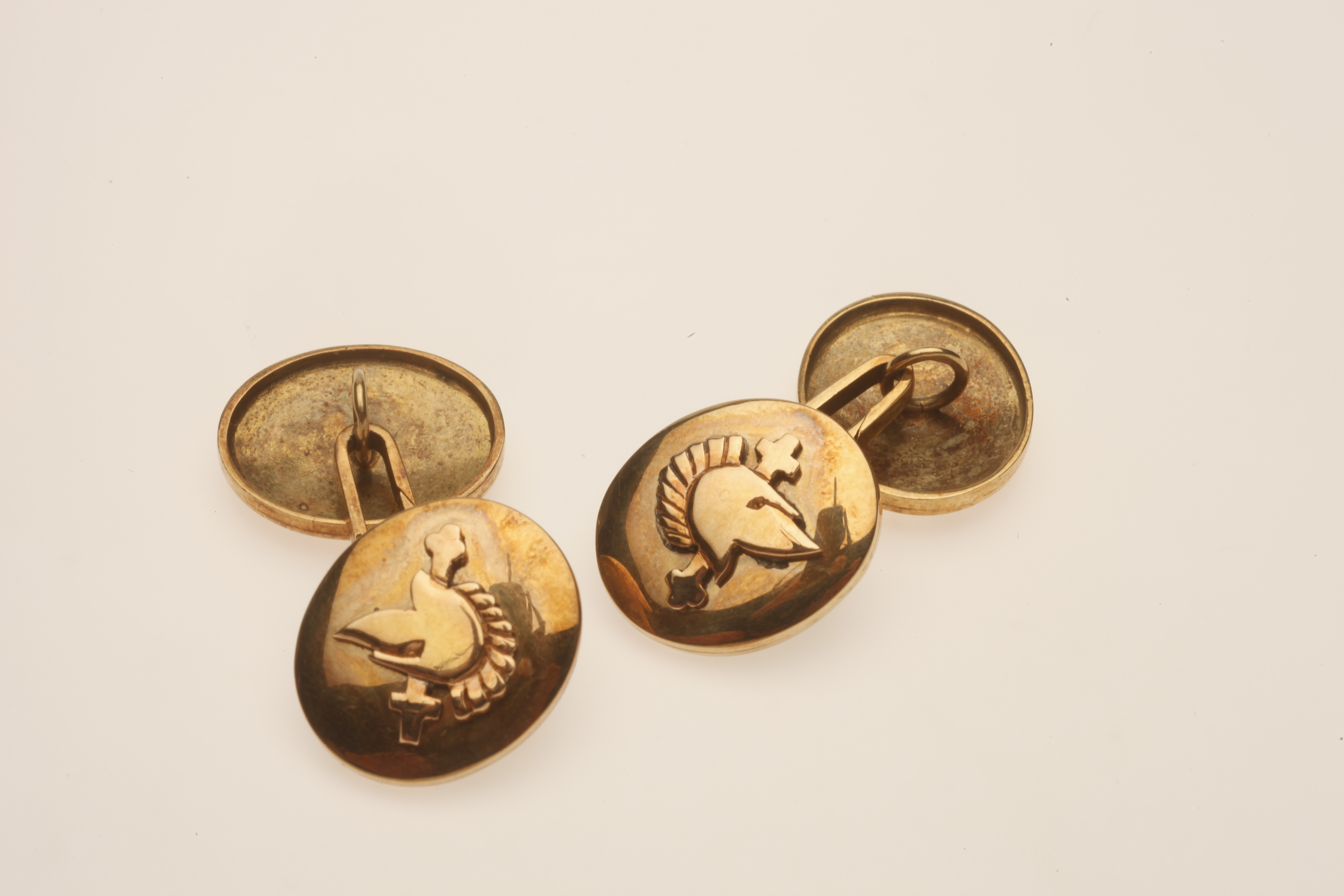
The CIA had two sets of cufflinks made for Kisevalter to use as a recognition signal with CIA asset Pyotr Semyonovich Popov, the agency’s first major postwar Soviet source of positive intelligence information. One set was kept at CIA headquarters; the other was sent to Popov. The headquarters set (shown here) was presented to Kisevalter upon his retirement.

By 1953, Kisevalter was a branch chief in the Soviet Russia Division of the Directorate of Operations. That year, Major Pyotr Semyonovich Popov of the GRU, contacted the CIA in Vienna, Austria, and offered to spy for the United States. Kisevalter was selected as Popov's handler, and spent the next five years in Vienna managing him. Popov provided the United States with detailed information on Soviet military plans and capabilities. During the period when he spied for the United States, Popov was considered to be "the CIA's most important agent." According to Kisevalter, Popov told him in April 1958 in West Berlin that he had recently overheard a drunken GRU colonel boast that the KGB knew all of the technical specifications of the top-secret Lockheed U-2 spy plane. This information prompted James Angleton to begin an unsuccessful nine-year hunt for the "Popov's Mole" in the CIA's Soviet Russia Division. Former Army Intelligence analyst John M. Newman says in his book, "Uncovering Popov's Mole," that this "mole" was probably Bruce Solie in the CIA's mole-hunting Office of Security.

Popov was arrested by the Soviets in October 1959, and executed in May 1960.

=== Oleg Penkovsky ===
In April 1961, Kisevalter became one of the case officers of GRU Colonel Oleg Penkovsky, who had volunteered to spy for the CIA and MI6, but in September of that year Kisevalter was relieved of that responsibility after it was reported to his superiors that he had gone to a London pub with a younger British case officer, gotten drunk, and started telling strangers what Penkovsky had told them earlier that day.

=== Yuri Nosenko ===
Kisevalter continued to be involved in agent recruitment and handling, including the case of the controversial English-speaking KGB walk-in, Yuri Nosenko. Kisevalter helped Russian-language-understanding Tennent H. Bagley interview Nosenko four times when he "walked in" to CIA in Geneva in late May, 1962. Bagley interviewed him during the first meeting, and Kisevalter flew in two days later to assist Bagley during the four remaining, secretly-tape-recorded meetings. In his book, "Spy Wars, Bagley says he decided to not tell Kisevalter that he believed Nosenko was a false defector, and that during the four meeting they had with Nosenko in June of 1962, "avuncular" Kisevalter surprised him by volunteering classified information to Nosenko that Nosenko had no need to know.

Bagley and Kisevalter also interviewed Nosenko when he recontacted them in Geneva in January 1964 (two months after the assassination of President John F. Kennedy), saying he wanted to leave his wife and daughters behind in Moscow and physically defect to the U.S. because he feared that the KGB was "on to" his treason. He then said during that meeting that he had been the case officer of Lee Harvey Oswald in the USSR. A few days later, Nosenko told Bagley and Kisevalter that he had to defect right then because he had just received a telegram from KGB headquarters ordering him to return to Moscow immediately.

Although from late June 1962, on, Bagley was convinced that Nosenko was a false defector and said that Nosenko nearly "broke" in front of Kisevalter and himself one day in 1964 when confronted with a particular contradiction in his "legend," Kisevalter "never accepted the case for a mole in the CIA or the argument that Nosenko was planted by the KGB".

=== Anatoliy Golitsyn ===
Kisevalter also briefly dealt with KGB defector Anatoliy Golitsyn when he defected to the U.S. in December 1961, and he talked him out of trying to meet with President John F. Kennedy. Golitsyn warned Angleton that a KGB false defector would soon arrive to discredit what he was telling him about possible KGB penetrations of the CIA, the FBI, and the intelligence services of other NATO countries, and when Nosenko "walked in" to the CIA in Geneva in mid-1962, Golitsyn told Angleton "this is who I warned you about." What Nosenko had told Bagley and Kisevalter in Geneva in 1962 so overlapped and contradicted what Golitsyn had told Angleton six months earlier that it led to his being incarcerated and subjected to harsh (but not tortuous) interrogations for three years.

== Other CIA ==
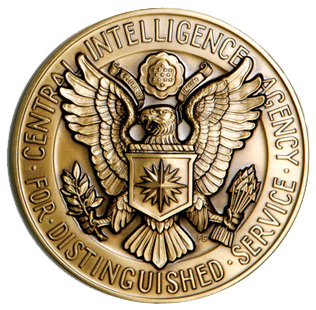
Distinguished Intelligence Medal

Kisevalter's final assignment before his retirement in 1970 was training new CIA operations officers. He received the CIA's highest award, the Distinguished Intelligence Medal. In 1997, when the CIA celebrated its 50th anniversary, Kisevalter was designated as one of its 50 Trailblazers. Kisevalter was featured in William Hood's 'skillful spy novel', Mole (1983), a presumed fictional account of the Popov operation, as the case officer Gregory Domnin. According to Clarence Ashley, his friend and biographer, Kisevalter came up with that pseudonym for Hood based on his great-grandmother's maiden name, Domnina.

== Personal life ==
Kisevalter died in October 1997, and is buried at Arlington National Cemetery.
