= Operation Shocker =

23-year FBI counterintelligence operation against the Soviet Union

Operation Shocker was a 23-year counterintelligence operation run by the US Federal Bureau of Investigation against the Soviet Union. The operation involved the fake defection in place of a US Army sergeant based in Washington, D.C. who, in return for hundreds of thousands of dollars over two decades, provided information to Soviet intelligence (GRU) as agreed by the Joint Chiefs of Staff. This included over 4,000 documents on a new nerve gas the US believed unweaponizable, with the US intending to waste Soviet resources.

== Overview ==
The operation began in 1959 when U.S. Army First Sergeant Joseph Edward Cassidy (1920-2011), assigned to the Army's nuclear power office near Washington, D.C., was approached (with Army permission) by the FBI. Cassidy, despite having no previous training, was able to make contact with a Soviet naval attache believed to be a spy, and set up an arrangement where he would provide information to the Soviets in exchange for money. Soviet requests for information were passed to the US Joint Chiefs of Staff, and various classified information provided as a result.

The principal Russian interest was in information about the US nerve gas program, and Cassidy initially established his credentials by providing genuine data from the US program. By 1964 he was in a position to begin pointing Soviet research towards a G-series nerve agent, GJ, which the US thought could not be produced in stable, weaponizable form. Cassidy provided over 4,000 documents on a mixture of real and non-existent research into the new gas, with the US intending to waste Soviet resources attempting to duplicate the work. David Wise, in his book Cassidy's Run, implies that the Soviet program to develop the Novichok agents may have been an unintended result of the misleading information.

The operation was highly classified, and when two FBI agents died in a plane crash while surveilling a Soviet spy, press and public were misled about the circumstances, and even the agents' families were told nothing for years.

A similar, and arguably more significant, disinformation operation was run by the FBI via double-agent Dmitri Polyakov, feeding the Soviet Union the false information that the US was covertly continuing with its biological weapons program despite public announcements to the contrary. The disinformation may have been one reason which led the Soviet Union to expand its biological weapons program, and a near-universal belief into the 1990s among its scientists that they were mirroring US efforts.
