= Sergey Varentsov =

Soviet military officer

- Born: 2 September [O.S. 21 August] 1901; Dmitrov, Russian Empire
- Died: 1 March 1971 (aged 69) Moscow, USSR
- Allegiance: Soviet Union
- Branch: Artillery forces
- Service years: 1919–1963
- Rank: Marshal of Artillery (demoted to Major General)
- Conflicts: Russian Civil War; World War II
- Awards: Hero of the Soviet Union (stripped in 1963)

Sergey Sergeyevich Varentsov (Russian: Сергей Сергеевич Варенцов; 2 September [O.S. 21 August] 1901 — 1 March 1971) was a Soviet Marshal of Artillery who was stripped of the title Hero of the Soviet Union for his connections to the Penkovsky affair.

== Early life ==
Varentsov was born on 2 September [O.S. 21 August] 1901 to a working class Russian family in Dmitrov, located in present-day Moscow oblast. Before joining the Red Army in 1919 he worked as an accountant. During the Russian Civil War he served in the 5th Kursk Revolutionary Regiment. Due to contracting typhus he spent a considerable amount of time in hospital before joining a guard company in his hometown Dmitrov. He went on to graduate from the Detskoy Selo courses for heavy artillery command in 1921 followed by the 1st artillery school as an external student in 1926. He then graduated in 1930 from advanced training courses for command personnel in artillery. Meanwhile, he served in a special-purpose artillery regiment and participated in the suppression of the Kronstadt rebellion. In 1927 he became the head of the regimental school of the 25th Artillery Regiment, based in Kremenchug. In 1934 he became the assistant commander of the 41st Artillery Regiment, and in 1937 he became commander of the unit. From March 1939 to November 1940 he served as the chief of the artillery of the 41st Rifle Division, and then became the Chief of Artillery of the 6th Army. In March 1941 he became the chief of artillery of the 6th Rifle Corps. That year he became a member of the Communist Party.

== World War II ==
At the start of the German invasion of the Soviet Union, Varentsov was chief of artillery in the 6th Rifle Corps, but in November he transferred to the 40th Army and then in September 1942 was transferred to the 60th Army; he then became commander of artillery of the Voronezh front. In January 1944 he sustained a severe hip injury in a car accident involving a tank, but after recovering in a Moscow hospital he turned to service. While he was recovering he was visited by Oleg Penkovsky. He participated in the planning and organization of artillery support to infantry in key battles including the battles for Kursk, the Dnieper, Kiev, Korsun-Shevchenkovsky, Love-Sandomierz, Berlin, and Prague. For his contribution to the victory in the war he was awarded the title Hero of the Soviet Union on 29 May 1945.

== Postwar ==
After the end of the war Varentsov continued to rise up in the military, becoming commander of artillery of the Central Group of Forces in July 1945 and then for the Carpathian Military District in January 1947 until June 1950. He then graduated from Higher Academic Courses at the Voroshilov Higher Military Academy in 1951, and went on to become commander artillery of the Transcaucasian Military District. From March 1955 to January 1961 he was commander of artillery of Soviet ground forces. He then became the commander of missile forces, and received the rank of chief marshal of artillery later that year. However, his career went into a downfall due to his connections to American spy Oleg Penkovsky. He died in Moscow on 1 March 1971.

=== Penkovsky affair ===
During World War II American spy Colonel Oleg Penkovsky served as the personal liaison officer for Varentsov. At some point he allegedly said that Penkovsky was like a son to him. It is disputed exactly how close Varentsov was to Penkovsky, but it is widely acknowledged that Varentsov had helped Penkovsky in his career. Penkovsky learned details about the state of the Soviet ICBM program from Varentsov.

After Penkovsky was exposed as a spy, Varentsov was demoted to major-general and stripped of the title Hero of the Soviet Union for his lack of vigilance. He was also dismissed from candidate membership of the Central Committee. Although he was never convicted of espionage, he was not rehabilitated.
