= The Courier (2020 film) =

2020 film directed by Dominic Cooke

- Theatrical release poster
- Directed by: Dominic Cooke
- Written by: Tom O’Connor
- Produced by: Adam Ackland; Ben Browning; Ben Pugh; Rory Aitken
- Starring: Benedict Cumberbatch; Merab Ninidze; Rachel Brosnahan; Jessie Buckley; Angus Wright
- Cinematography: Sean Bobbitt
- Edited by: Tariq Anwar; Gareth C. Scales
- Music by: Abel Korzeniowski
- Production companies: 42; FilmNation Entertainment; SunnyMarch
- Distributed by: Lionsgate; Roadside Attractions
- Release dates: 24 January 2020 (Sundance); 19 March 2021 (United States); 13 August 2021 (United Kingdom)
- Running time: 111 minutes
- Countries: United Kingdom; United States
- Language: English
- Box office: $26 million

The Courier is a 2020 historical spy film directed by Dominic Cooke and written by Tom O'Connor. The film stars Benedict Cumberbatch as Greville Wynne, and is based on the true story of a British businessman who was recruited by the Secret Intelligence Service to be a message conduit with Russian spy source Oleg Penkovsky (played by Merab Ninidze) in the 1960s. Rachel Brosnahan, Jessie Buckley, and Angus Wright also star.

The Courier had its world premiere under its original title Ironbark at the Sundance Film Festival on 24 January 2020, and was theatrically released in the United States on 19 March 2021, and the United Kingdom on 13 August 2021. The film received generally favourable reviews from critics.

== Plot ==
In 1960, Oleg Penkovsky, a high-ranking Soviet official and GRU intelligence officer, with access to top secret nuclear information, is disillusioned with the leadership of Nikita Khrushchev in the light of the growing threat of a nuclear war with the United States. He contacts the CIA and offers to provide information that could help de-escalate the situation. The CIA and MI6 decide that it would be best to use an ordinary businessman as an intermediary, rather than an intelligence officer.

They approach salesman Greville Wynne to go to Moscow under the pretense of exploring commercial opportunities. Wynne establishes seemingly normal business relations with Penkovsky and the latter makes arrangements with western intelligence agencies to feed them information. He asks that they continue to use Wynne as their regular courier, reasoning that he will be under the Soviets' radar. Initially opposed to the task, Wynne eventually agrees, partly because CIA officer Emily Donovan emphasizes that his efforts could help prevent a nuclear war, and also after Penkovsky visits Wynne at his home and tells him that he is betting his life on Wynne's success.

Wynne uses his regular business travels to Moscow to carry messages and packages provided to the CIA by Penkovsky. However, that takes a toll on Wynne's personal life and he becomes agitated, leading his wife to think that he might be having an affair.

Penkovsky learns that the Soviets want to turn Cuba into a nuclear threat to the United States, and relays that information, along with photographs and military plans, to the CIA, who eventually verify it using their own intelligence. The Americans are able to use that early lead to their advantage during the Cuban Missile Crisis. However, the Soviets, using their own double agents, realize they have an information vulnerability. In Moscow, Wynne realizes that his hotel room has been searched but leaves the country before he has a chance to warn Penkovsky.

Worried about Penkovsky's fate should he be left behind, Wynne volunteers, against the advice of MI6, to go back to Moscow to help arrange Penkovsky's defection. However, the Soviets, having previously poisoned Penkovsky and searched his belongings while he was in the hospital, foil the plan and arrest both men.

Wynne is sent to prison where he endures harsh conditions, which result in his health significantly deteriorating. He adamantly maintains his innocence, claiming that he knew Penkovsky only as a business client and did not know what was in the packages he had delivered. Several months later, Wynne is allowed a visit from his wife, who tells him that the Soviets have removed their missiles from Cuba, boosting his morale. He also gets to meet Penkovsky in prison while being interrogated. Wynne tells Penkovsky that his sacrifice has been worth it and the two men emotionally clutch hands.

In April 1964, Wynne is released in exchange for the Soviet spy Konon Molody and returns to London. It is revealed that Penkovsky has been tried for treason and executed, and is buried in an unmarked grave, although his family are allowed to live in Moscow. The U.S. and Soviets establish a communications hotline between their leaders to help prevent future nuclear disasters.

== Cast ==
- Benedict Cumberbatch as Greville Wynne
- Merab Ninidze as Oleg Penkovsky
- Rachel Brosnahan as Emily Donovan / Helen Talbott, CIA officer
- Jessie Buckley as Sheila, Wynne's wife
- Angus Wright as Dickie Franks / James Dobbing, MI6 officer
- Željko Ivanek as CIA Director John A. McCone
- Kirill Pirogov as Oleg Gribanov, KGB officer and a chief of KGB's 3rd Directorate (Military Counterintelligence).
- Anton Lesser as Bertrand
- Maria Mironova as Vera Penkovskaya, Oleg's wife
- Vladimir Chuprikov as Nikita Khrushchev

== Production ==
On 1 May 2018, it was announced that FilmNation Entertainment was producing Ironbark, a film about British spy Greville Wynne from a script by Tom O’Connor. Dominic Cooke was set to direct the film and produce alongside O’Connor, Ben Pugh, Rory Aitken, Adam Ackland, Josh Varney, and Leah Clarke. Production companies involved with the film include SunnyMarch.

Alongside the initial production announcement, it was confirmed that Benedict Cumberbatch had been cast as Greville Wynne. In October 2018, it was announced that Rachel Brosnahan, Jessie Buckley, Merab Ninidze, Angus Wright, and Kirill Pirogov had joined the cast of the film.

Principal photography for the film commenced in London on 15 October 2018 and it lasted until 7 December 2018.

== Music ==
Abel Korzeniowski composed the score and Lakeshore Records released the soundtrack on 19 March 2021.

Track listing and credits adapted from Soundtrack.Net.

The Courier (Original Motion Picture Soundtrack)
No.	Title	Length
1.	"Spies and Typewriters"	2:23
2.	"Iron Curtain"	2:22
3.	"First Contact"	2:01
4.	"Greville"	1:34
5.	"Secret Meeting"	2:15
6.	"Prelude"	1:30
7.	"It Has to Be You"	3:06
8.	"Eyes of the State"	2:07
9.	"Cigarettes"	2:08
10.	"Cuban Missiles"	1:05
11.	"Our Last Trip to Moscow"	4:02
12.	"I Have a Light Day"	1:18
13.	"Trenchcoats vs. KGB"	3:04
14.	"Arrested"	2:25
15.	"Cold Soup"	2:11
16.	"Breakdown"	1:32
17.	"When You Come Home"	1:04
18.	"Maybe We Are Only Two People"	4:40
Total length:		40:47

== Release ==
The film had its world premiere at the Sundance Film Festival on 24 January 2020, under the title Ironbark. Shortly after, Roadside Attractions and Lionsgate acquired U.S. distribution rights to the film. Under the new name The Courier, the film was given an original 28 August 2020 theatrical release in the United States. However, due to the COVID-19 pandemic, it was delayed to 16 October 2020. It was scheduled to be released in the United Kingdom on 30 October 2020. It was delayed again to 19 March 2021, and was eventually released on 13 August 2021.

== Reception ==
=== Box office ===
The Courier grossed $6.6 million in the United States and Canada, and $19.4 million elsewhere, for a worldwide total of $26 million.

In its domestic opening weekend, the film grossed $1.9 million from 1,433 theaters in its opening weekend, finishing third at the box office. The film made $1 million in its second weekend.

=== Critical response ===
On review aggregator Rotten Tomatoes, the film holds an approval rating of 85% based on 214 reviews, with an average rating of 6.8/10. The website's critics consensus reads: "The Courier delivers a rousingly effective old-school spy adventure elevated by a thrilling fact-based story and Benedict Cumberbatch's nervy central performance." On Metacritic, it has a weighted average score of 65 out of 100 based on reviews from 37 critics, indicating "generally favorable" reviews. According to PostTrak, 82% of audience members gave the film a positive score, with 62% saying they would definitely recommend it.

The Washington Post's Ann Hornaday gave the film 3 out of 4 stars, saying: "The Courier makes a smart, stylish stand for the kind of old-fashioned period spy thriller that is increasingly being turned into bingeable series for streaming services. Its modesty and carefully managed ambitions define its strong suit at a time when such films are scarcer every day." Peter Debruge of Variety called the film "solid if dull-by-definition espionage story" and said: "[The Courier's] hook is that it's based on true events, and the underlying history deserves to be shared."

=== Nominations ===
Merab Ninidze was nominated for Best Supporting Actor at the 2020 British Independent Film Awards.
