= Peter Deriabin =

KGB officer who defected to the US (1921–1992)

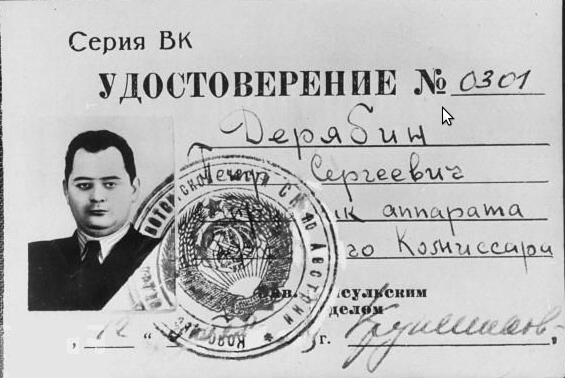
ID document

Peter Sergeyevich Deriabin (Russian: Петр Сергеевич Дерябин; 1921 – 20 August 1992) was a KGB officer who defected to the United States in 1954. After his defection, he worked for the Central Intelligence Agency, and wrote several books on the KGB. He died in 1992 at the age of 71.

== Pre-defection life and career ==
Deriabin was born in Siberia's Altai region. In his book The Secret World, he gave his date of birth as 13 February 1921. The KGB Wanted List for 1979 gave his date of birth as 1919.

Deriabin was a member of the Communist Party. He went to Biysk Teachers College as well as the Institute for Marxism-Leninism. In World War II, he was wounded four times and was reassigned to the Soviet Navy's SMERSH (military counterintelligence group). He was later an investigator with the People's Commissariat of Internal Affairs (NKVD), where he eventually moved up to the organization's headquarters and gained the rank of Colonel. Deriabin was Stalin's bodyguard for a short while, and accompanied him to the conferences at Yalta, Tehran and Potsdam. It was in this position that he was able to witness crimes in the upper echelons of Soviet power. That, together with an unhappy marriage, would lead him to defect.

== Defection and subsequent career ==
=== Defection ===
In 1953 following Stalin's death, Deriabin was stationed in Vienna as Chief of Soviet Counterintelligence as well as Communist Party boss for the entire Austro-German section. In 1954, he defected to the United States "via a freight train ride through Soviet occupied territory near Vienna," and was the highest ranking Soviet intelligence officer to have done so at the time. He chose the Americans because he felt they "won't cave in when the USSR demands my return". In retaliation, the Military Collegium of the Supreme Court of the USSR sentenced him to death in absentia. He testified before the US Senate and the HUAC in 1959, and co-wrote a book about his time in the KGB.

=== Work with the CIA ===
Deriabin went to graduate school at the University of Michigan and the University of Virginia, and joined the CIA.

A few days after the assassination of President Kennedy, Deriabin wrote a lengthy memorandum for the CIA, in which he theorized that Lee Harvey Oswald was a KGB agent who either was dispatched to kill Kennedy or was sent to the United States on a different mission and then committed the assassination on his own. Deriabin contended that the Soviets would have accomplished several objectives by eliminating Kennedy. Among them was removing the West's preeminent cold warrior from the scene, constraining US covert actions against Cuba, which would be stigmatized as acts of vengeance, as well as diverting the Soviet people's attention from their many domestic problems.

He was also involved in the Yuri Nosenko case as an interrogator and as the editor of the secret recordings made of Nosenko's meetings with Tennent H. Bagley and George Kisevalter (in which he found 150 errors made by the native-Russian-speaking Kisevalter; see pages 580-81 in Bagley's 1978 HSCA testimony as "Mr. D.C." -- as in "Deputy Chief" in HSCA Report, Volume XII at maryferrell.org). Nosenko was a controversial Soviet defector who was interrogated harshly (but not torturously) by the CIA, detained under Spartan living conditions (including solitary confinement), and presumed to be a KGB plant by Bagley, James Angleton, and the Chief of the Soviet Russia Division, David E. Murphy, from 1964 until he was "cleared" in late 1968 by possible KGB "mole" Bruce Solie, and released. Deriabin was one of the CIA officials who believed he was a plant, claiming that the details of Nosenko's stories about his experiences in SMERSH and the KGB didn't match up with Deriabin's own experience in those agencies.

Deriabin was considered an asset when the NSA ramped up operations in the 1970s, and entered the agency's ranks during a visit to Fort Meade in 1973. A detailed report of his visit was declassified in 2012.

Deriabin retired from the CIA in 1981.

== Death ==
Deriabin died following a stroke on 20 August 1992 in Northern Virginia. At the time of his death, he was survived by family members whose names were kept secret by the CIA. According to the CIA, Deriabin's knowledge and understanding of the KGB was "the foundation for the West's knowledge of the agency."

== Books ==
He co-authored several books.

- The Secret World, with Frank Gibney, Doubleday, 1959
- Watchdogs of Terror, 1984, University Publications of America
- KGB, Masters of the Soviet Union, with Tennent H. Bagley, Hippocrene Books, 1990
- Schecter, Jerrold L; Deriabin, Peter S; Penkovskij, Oleg Vladimirovic (1992). The Spy Who Saved the World: How a Soviet Colonel Changed the Course of the Cold War. New York: Scribner. ISBN 978-0-684-19068-6. OCLC 909016158.
- Inside Stalin's Kremlin, Brasseys Publications, 1998
- Deriabin gave a detailed account of his views on the Nosenko case to Tennent H. "Pete" Bagley, which were published in Bagley's book Spy Wars, released in 2007.
