= Vladimir Kuzichkin =

KGB officer and defector (1947–2009)

Vladimir Anatolyevich Kuzichkin (Russian: Владимир Анатольевич Кузичкин; 1947 – May 2009) was a former Soviet foreign intelligence officer who defected to the United Kingdom. He worked as an undercover agent for the KGB in Iran beginning in 1977. The details of his defection are uncertain, but he arrived in the UK in October 1982. Kuzichkin gave information on Soviet operations, agents, and socialist activists to MI6; British intelligence and the CIA then provided the information to the Khomeini regime, which executed many of the agents and socialist activists.

His memoirs were published in the UK in 1990 as Inside the KGB: Myth and Reality by André Deutsch Limited. Pantheon Books published the US edition under the title Inside the KGB: My Life in Soviet Espionage.

== Early life and recruitment to KGB ==
Kuzichkin was born in Moscow in 1947 to a large family. He joined the Soviet Army and was stationed in East Germany for three years. Upon exiting the service, Kuzichkin enrolled at the Institute of Asian and African Countries, where he studied Iranian history and Persian.

While still at the institute, Kuzichkin took an opportunity to travel to Iran and work as an interpreter for the Ministry of Foreign Trade; before his departure, Kuzichkin was recruited into the intelligence service by the KGB. He arrived in Iran near the end of 1973, and spent a year working as interpreter at an iron mine in Bafq and completing his thesis.

Upon return from Iran, Kuzichkin's KGB handler, Nikolai Sakalin, put Kuzichkin in touch with Nikolai Korznikov, deputy head of illegal intelligence operations for the KGB. Kuzichkin was sent to the Red Banner Institute to receive intelligence training in August 1975.

Kuzichkin graduated from the Red Banner Institute in July 1976, and he was assigned to Directorate S, the illegal intelligence unit of the First Chief Directorate. His department was responsible for covering Iran, Afghanistan, and Turkey. Kuzichkin went to Tehran, using a position as an attaché at the embassy as cover.

== Revolution, defection, and aftermath ==
Kuzichkin worked in the 'N Line' at the residency in Tehran, responsible for overseeing and protecting the activities of the KGB's illegal agents. His time in Iran (1977–1982) coincided with a period of political turmoil for the Soviets in the Middle East, centered around the Iranian Revolution and the Soviet invasion of Afghanistan in 1979. The new Khomeini regime in Iran at first tolerated the Soviets and Iranian leftist groups, but grew increasingly hostile. In Afghanistan, the Soviet Union supported the ruling Marxist-Leninist People's Democratic Party of Afghanistan (PDPA) and its efforts to radically reform the country, which prompted widespread revolt. Soviet leadership and the KGB decided to assassinate and replace PDPA leader Hafizullah Amin with a more moderate option. Against the recommendation of the KGB, Leonid Brezhnev initiated a full-scale invasion of Afghanistan in 1979.

On 1 January 1980, Kuzichkin was present when a group of civilians rushed the Soviet embassy in Tehran, apparently in response to the invasion of Afghanistan. They were repelled by the Iranian Revolutionary Guard, but leadership at the embassy ordered the destruction of all secret documents and equipment. Foreign embassies were on high-alert after the beginning of the Iran hostage crisis. On 27 April 1980, the anniversary of the Saur Revolution (when the PDPA took over in Afghanistan), there was another attack on the Soviet embassy, and this time the assailants were able to penetrate embassy property and cause damage; the assailants were arrested by the Iranian Revolutionary Guard and no one was hurt. The Iran–Iraq War began in September 1980, and gave the Khomeini regime pretense of cracking down on opposition at home. It was under these circumstances that Kuzichkin and the head of the Soviet residence, Leonid Shebarshin, created and hid a secret cache of intelligence; they photographed important documents and hid the undeveloped film in the wall of the residency.

In October 1981, Kuzichkin went to the British Embassy in Tehran and told Nicholas Barrington he was willing to work as a double-agent for the UK. MI6 gave Kuzichkin the codename "REDWOOD" and he relayed information to Britain for eight months. Ben Macintyre wrote that Kuzichkin's main reason for defecting was erectile dysfunction: he insisted on being circumcised, and only at a hospital in the West to keep the Soviets and Iranians from discovering his condition.

According to Kuzichkin, however, in the spring of 1982, he checked the cache and found that the film had disappeared. Assuming he would be blamed for the disappearance, and fearing the repercussions, he fled to the west, escaping Iran via Turkey. He was the first known officer to defect from Directorate S.

The veracity of Kuzichkin's account and the details of his defection are unknown. James Rusbridger, in his review of Kuzichkin's memoir, claimed that Kuzichkin had been working as a double agent for the British since early 1981, feeding MI6 intelligence for a period of 18 months. Other sources put Kuzichkin's first contact with the British at a later date, in the summer of 1982.

After making it to London, Kuzichkin was debriefed by MI6 and the CIA. The CIA shared details about Soviet agents in Iran with the Khomeini regime, who in turn arrested and executed nearly 200 people. Most of those arrested or killed were members of the Tudeh Party, with their leadership also arrested and forced to apologize on a televised broadcast. 18 Soviet diplomats were officially expelled from Iran. Kuzichkin was given British citizenship and the new name Alexander Larkin.

Defectors have always been a volatile commodity, and while some, such as Oleg Lyalin, adjust to their new life, others, such as the KGB officers Vladimir Kuzichkin and Viktor Makarov, found the process challenging. Both developed mental health issues, and Kuzichkin was once discovered stark naked in a motorway service station in Somerset, resulting in his immediate hospitalisation.

After the publication of Kuzichkin's memoir, Inside the KGB, Ali Ağca claimed that Kuzichkin ordered him to kill Pope John Paul II.

== Personal life and death ==
On 4 June 1983 Kuzichkin married a French woman, Chantal van Santen. At the time, he suffered from impotence, which was a factor in his defection. Kuzichkin died of a heart attack in 2009.

== See also ==
- List of Eastern Bloc defectors
- List of KGB defectors

== Footnotes ==
=== Sources ===
- Kuzichkin, Vladimir (1990). Inside the KGB: My Life in Soviet Espionage. Translated by Thomas B. Beattie. foreword by Frederick Forsyth. New York: Pantheon Books. ISBN 0-679-40146-6 – via Internet Archive.
