= Fake defection =

Intelligence agent technique

Fake defection, often referred to as a "provocation" or "dangle" in intelligence circles, is a defection by an intelligence agent made on false pretenses. Fake defectors (who may be referred to as "plants") may spread disinformation or aid in uncovering moles. The risk that a defection may be fake is often a concern by intelligence agencies debriefing defectors.

Examples of Soviet defectors that some sources have considered fake include Oleg Penkovsky (considered fake by Peter Wright and James Angleton) and Vitaly Yurchenko. Examples of US fake defection operations include Operation Shocker.

In fiction, examples of fake defection include the James Bond film The Living Daylights (1987), a subplot in the TV Show The Americans, the novel The Spy Who Came in from the Cold and its film adaptation, and Torn Curtain (1966 film).
