= The Pacific Century =

Documentary series

- Written by: Alex Gibney
- Narrated by: Peter Coyote
- Music by: Robert Boress
- Country of origin: United States
- Original language: English

Production
- Producers: Peter Bull; Alex Gibney
- Cinematography: Samuel Painter
- Production company: Jigsaw Productions

Original release
- Release: October 15, 1992

The Pacific Century is a 1992 PBS Emmy Award winning ten-part documentary series narrated by Peter Coyote about the rise of the Pacific Rim economies. Alex Gibney was the writer for the series, and Frank Gibney, his father, wrote the companion trade book, The Pacific Century: America and Asia in a Changing World. The companion college textbook, Pacific Century: The Emergence of Modern Pacific Asia, was written and edited by E. Mark Borthwick.

The series is a co-production of Pomona College's Pacific Basin Institute and KCTS-TV in Seattle. Principle funding was provided by the Annenberg Foundation and the Ford Foundation.

== Episodes ==
1. The Two Coasts of China: Asia and the Challenge of the West - How China's past experiences with foreign conquest led to its downfall in the face of Western colonialism.
2. The Meiji Revolution - The transformation of Japan into the most Westernized country in Asia, at great cost.
3. From the Barrel of a Gun - The parallel journeys to freedom of Indonesia and Vietnam, through their leaders, Sukarno and Ho Chi Minh.
4. Writers and Revolutionaries - How the philosophies of Lu Xun and Ikki Kita influenced the thinking of the Chinese and Japanese people, respectively, into the 20th century.
5. Reinventing Japan - How the United States of America recrafted Japan into its own image during its eight year post-war occupation.
6. Inside Japan, Inc. - The road to Japan's economic prosperity in the post-occupation era to the present day.
7. Big Business and the Ghost of Confucius - How the teaching of Confucius is still exploited by capitalists in South Korea, Taiwan and Singapore.
8. The Fight for Democracy - The 50 years struggle of South Korea for self-determination.
9. Sentimental Imperialists: America in Asia - The diplomatic failings of the United States with The Philippines and China.
10. The Pacific Century: The Future of the Pacific Basin
