= Pyotr Semyonovich Popov =

Soviet intelligence officer and spy

Pyotr Semyonovich Popov (Russian: Пётр Семёнович Попов; July 1923 – January 1960) was a colonel in the Soviet military intelligence apparatus (GRU). He was the first GRU officer to offer his services to the Central Intelligence Agency after World War II. Between 1953 and 1958, he provided the United States government with large amounts of information concerning military capabilities and espionage operations. He was codenamed ATTIC for most of his time with the CIA, and his case officer was George Kisevalter.

In 1953 Popov was a GRU officer stationed in Vienna, a case officer working against Yugoslav targets. Popov first made contact in 1953 by slipping a letter into the parked car of a United States diplomat in Vienna, offering to sell Soviet documents. He seemed to be motivated by a deep anger at what he felt was government exploitation of the peasants of Russia, including his own family. According to a report written by the CIA in 2013, he was motivated by money to be able to "maintain both a wife and a mistress". While stationed in Vienna, Popov was able to provide documents such as the 1951 Soviet army field regulations, and after a July 1954 home visit to the Soviet Union, information regarding Soviet nuclear submarines and guided missiles.

In 1955 Popov was suddenly transferred to East Berlin to work with illegal agents being sent to the West. He continued to provide counterintelligence and military information. In April 1958 Popov told Kisevalter that a senior KGB official had boasted of having "full technical details" of the Lockheed U-2 spy plane, leading U2 project director Richard M. Bissell, Jr. to conclude the project had a leak. On 1 May 1960 a U-2 was shot down over the Soviet Union, in the 1960 U-2 incident.

Popov was dismissed from the GRU in November 1958, and placed on reserve status. In January 1959, after incriminating evidence was found in his apartment, he was run as a double agent for three months. He was then arrested in October 1959, and sentenced to death in January 1960.

It was never proved how he was exposed, but one possibility is that U.S. surveillance in October 1957 of one of Popov's agents led to suspicion falling on him. Reportedly, Margarita Nikolievska Tairov, an "illegal" agent trained for work in the United States, was scheduled to meet another agent (in fact, her husband, Igor), identified as Walter Anthony Sjoa. Travelling as Mary Grodnik, she noticed she was under surveillance, allegedly all the way from Berlin Tempelhof Airport. (Certainly, her entirely innocuous behavior, and her husband's, including their abrupt disappearance, suggest they suspected something was amiss.) She reported this, and the matter was thoroughly investigated by Moscow. The investigation pointed to Popov, who had been the woman's control officer in East Berlin. He may also have been exposed by British double agent George Blake, who inadvertently learned the CIA was using a senior Soviet intelligence officer stationed in East Germany as a mole. Other sources indicate a coded letter to Popov, sent by the CIA and intercepted by the KGB, led to his arrest (this may be a misunderstanding – Popov passed a letter to British intelligence, of which Blake became aware). More recent evidence suggests Popov was already under suspicion prior to the Tairov incident, due to a leak of a private speech by Marshal Zhukov at which Popov was present. Popov was executed by Soviet authorities in 1960. Former CIA Soviet Russia counterintelligence officer Tennent H. Bagley believed Popov was not detected by Soviet surveillance but was betrayed in Washington D.C. by Edward Ellis Smith, a CIA security officer who had served as Popov's dead drop setter-upper who had recently been fired from the American Embassy in Moscow, and another, unknown-to-Bagley, CIA officer.
