= Oleg Penkovsky =

Soviet military intelligence officer and Western spy (1919–1963)

Oleg Penkovsky Оле́г Влади́мирович Пенько́вский
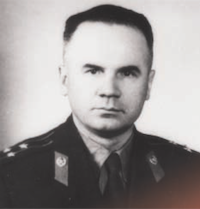
- Born: 23 April 1919; Vladikavkaz, Mountainous Republic of the Northern Caucasus
- Died: 16 May 1963 (aged 44); Butyrka Prison, Moscow, Russian SFSR, Soviet Union
- Cause of death: Execution
- Education: Frunze Military Academy
- Criminal charge: Treason
- Criminal penalty: Death
- Spouse: Vera Gapanovich
- Espionage activity
- Country: Soviet Union
- Allegiance: United States and United Kingdom
- Service branch: GRU
- Service years: 1953–1963
- Rank: Colonel
- Codename: YOGA, HERO

Oleg Vladimirovich Penkovsky (Russian: Оле́г Влади́мирович Пенько́вский; 23 April 1919 – 16 May 1963), codenamed Hero by the CIA and Yoga by MI6, was a Soviet military intelligence officer and colonel in the GRU who supplied intelligence to the United States and the United Kingdom during the early 1960s.

Penkovsky provided extensive information about Soviet military capabilities, including technical information about Soviet ballistic missile systems and evidence that the Soviet intercontinental ballistic missile (ICBM) force was less capable than Soviet public claims had suggested. During the Cuban Missile Crisis, United States intelligence assessments combined material supplied by Penkovsky, codenamed IRONBARK, with U-2 reconnaissance photography to identify Soviet missile systems deployed in Cuba and assess their operational readiness.

Penkovsky was one of the highest-ranking Soviet officials to provide intelligence to the West up to that time. He was arrested by Soviet authorities in October 1962, tried for treason, and executed in May 1963.

== Early life and military career ==
Penkovsky was a baby when his father was killed while fighting as an officer in the White Army during the Russian Civil War. Brought up in the North Caucasus, Penkovsky graduated from the Kiev Artillery Academy with a diploma in military engineering and was promoted to the rank of lieutenant in 1939. After taking part in the Winter War against Finland and in World War II, he reached the rank of lieutenant colonel.

In 1944, he was assigned to the headquarters of Colonel-General Sergey Varentsov, commander of artillery on the 1st Ukrainian Front, who became his patron. Penkovsky was wounded in action in 1944, at about the same time as Varentsov, who appointed him his liaison officer. In 1945, Penkovsky married the teenage daughter of Lieutenant-General Dmitri Gapanovich, thereby acquiring another high-ranking patron. On Varentsov's recommendation, he enrolled at the Frunze Military Academy in 1945 and graduated in 1948 with a degree in military science. Following his education, he worked as a staff officer for the Soviet Army.

Penkovsky joined the GRU as an officer in 1953. In 1955, he was appointed military attaché in Ankara, Turkey, but was recalled after reporting his superior officer, and later other GRU personnel, for breaches of regulations, which made him unpopular within the department. Relying once again on Varentsov's patronage, he spent nine months studying rocket artillery at the Dzerzhinsky Military Academy. He was subsequently selected for the post of military attaché in India, but the KGB uncovered the circumstances of his father's death and Penkovsky was suspended, investigated, and assigned in November 1960 to the State Committee for Science and Technology. He later worked at the Soviet Committee for Scientific Research.

== Overtures to CIA and MI6 ==
Penkovsky approached American students on the Bolshoy Moskvoretsky Bridge in Moscow in July 1960 and gave them a package in which he offered to spy for the United States. He asked them to deliver it to an intelligence officer at the US Embassy. The CIA initially delayed contacting him. When the US Embassy in Moscow declined to cooperate, fearing an international incident, the CIA contacted MI6 for assistance.

Greville Wynne, a British salesman of industrial equipment who regularly travelled to countries behind the Iron Curtain, was recruited by MI6 to communicate with Penkovsky.

The first meeting between Penkovsky and two American and two British intelligence officers occurred during a visit by Penkovsky to London in April 1961. For the following 18 months, Penkovsky supplied a large volume of information to a joint CIA–MI6 team of handlers, including documents indicating that the Soviet nuclear arsenal was substantially smaller than Nikita Khrushchev publicly claimed and that the Soviets were not yet capable of producing large numbers of ICBMs. His reporting subsequently became important in United States assessments of Soviet capabilities during the Cuban Missile Crisis.

Peter Wright, a former British MI5 officer and critic of the leadership of British intelligence during much of the Cold War, believed that Penkovsky may have been a Soviet-controlled agent. Wright noted that, unlike Igor Gouzenko and some earlier defectors, Penkovsky did not reveal the names of Soviet agents in the West but primarily supplied organisational and military information. He also regarded the provision of some original documents as suspicious, believing that they would have been difficult for Penkovsky to remove from their sources. In his memoir Spycatcher, Wright argued that Soviet intelligence may have exploited what he regarded as weaknesses in British counterintelligence by deliberately presenting Penkovsky as a genuine Western source.

In Spycatcher, written with journalist Paul Greengrass, Wright recalled a response from Maurice Oldfield, who was later Chief of MI6:

When I first wrote my Penkovsky analysis Maurice Oldfield (later Chief of MI6 in the 1970s), who played a key role in the Penkovsky case as Chief of Station in Washington, told me: 'You've got a long row to hoe with this one, Peter, there's a lot of K's [knighthoods] and Gongs [medals] riding high on the back of Penkovsky' he said, referring to the honours heaped on those involved in the Penkovsky operation.

Other intelligence officers and defectors regarded Penkovsky as genuine. KGB defector Vladimir Sakharov wrote that Penkovsky's case had contributed to an internal KGB reorganisation, stating: "I knew about the ongoing KGB reorganisation precipitated by Oleg Penkovsky's case and Yuri Nosenko's defection. The party was not satisfied with KGB performance ... I knew many heads in the KGB had rolled again, as they had after Stalin".

A later CIA review of the operation stated that a comprehensive internal study completed in 1978 had established that Penkovsky was not under Soviet control during his work for Western intelligence and that the information he supplied was genuine and highly valuable, although uncertainty remained over how he was eventually compromised.

In a meeting with Leon Panetta, then director of the CIA, the head of Russia's Foreign Intelligence Service, Mikhail Fradkov, identified Penkovsky as Russia's greatest intelligence failure when Panetta asked him what he regarded as the country's worst intelligence setback.

== Cuban Missile Crisis ==
The Soviet leadership began secretly deploying nuclear-capable ballistic missiles to Cuba in 1962 as part of Operation Anadyr. On 14 October, a US U-2 reconnaissance flight photographed Soviet missile installations under construction in western Cuba. Analysis of the photographs provided the first verified evidence that Soviet offensive ballistic missiles were being deployed on the island.

Penkovsky had previously supplied Western intelligence with extensive technical information about Soviet missile systems, including operating manuals for the SS-4 and SS-5 ballistic missiles. This material enabled US analysts to compare the U-2 photographs with known Soviet missile configurations and contributed to assessments of the type, capabilities, and readiness of the missiles being installed in Cuba. An intelligence evaluation issued on 18 October was explicitly based in part on IRONBARK material supplied by Penkovsky as well as U-2 photography.

Penkovsky's reporting had also indicated that the Soviet strategic nuclear arsenal was less capable than Soviet public claims had suggested, providing the Kennedy administration with additional information for assessing the balance of strategic forces during the crisis. Former GRU captain Viktor Suvorov, who defected to the United Kingdom in 1978, later credited Penkovsky's intelligence with helping to prevent the crisis from escalating into nuclear war.

Penkovsky was arrested on 22 October 1962, the same day that President John F. Kennedy publicly announced the discovery of Soviet offensive missiles in Cuba.

== Arrest and death ==
Penkovsky was arrested by Soviet authorities on 22 October 1962. On 2 November, eleven days after his arrest, his Western handlers in Moscow received signals previously agreed upon with Penkovsky to indicate that one of his dead drops had been loaded: two voiceless telephone calls and a chalk mark on a telephone or street-light pole.

CIA officer Richard Jacob, who was serving at the United States Embassy under diplomatic cover, went to collect the material. The dead drop contained a letter ostensibly from Penkovsky, but Jacob was ambushed and arrested by the KGB while servicing the drop. Because Penkovsky was already in Soviet custody, the signalling sequence and letter were evidently being operated under KGB control. The operation exposed Jacob as one of Penkovsky's Western contacts. Jacob was subsequently declared persona non grata and expelled from the Soviet Union.

Penkovsky and Greville Wynne were tried together in Moscow in May 1963. Penkovsky was convicted of treason and sentenced to death. His appeal was rejected, and the sentence was carried out on 16 May 1963. Alexander Zagvozdin, the chief KGB interrogator involved in the case, later stated that Penkovsky was shot and that his body was subsequently cremated.

A competing account alleged that Penkovsky had instead been burned alive in a crematorium. Soviet sculptor Ernst Neizvestny told the authors of The Spy Who Saved the World that the director of the Donskoye Cemetery crematorium had described to him how Penkovsky had been "executed by fire". Neizvestny said that he believed the account, while acknowledging that it may have acquired elements of a "folk story". The account that Penkovsky was shot and subsequently cremated is therefore distinct from the later allegation that he was burned alive.

== Possible compromise and the "Zepp" incident ==
Former CIA counterintelligence officer Tennent H. Bagley argued in his 2007 book Spy Wars: Moles, Mysteries, and Deadly Games that the KGB had learned of Penkovsky's espionage within weeks of his recruitment by the CIA and MI6 in April 1961. Bagley's conclusion was based in part on an episode involving the name "Zeph" or "Zepp".

About two weeks after Penkovsky's recruitment in London, Greville Wynne and Penkovsky had a conversation in a Moscow restaurant that was secretly recorded by the KGB. During the conversation Wynne asked Penkovsky, "How's Zeph?" The name referred to Stephanie, a woman whom Wynne and Penkovsky had met in London during Penkovsky's visit. After Wynne's arrest in 1962, his KGB interrogators played him the recording and repeatedly asked him to identify the person they heard as "Zepp".

Bagley considered this significant because several months before Penkovsky's arrest, while Bagley and CIA officer George Kisevalter were interviewing KGB officer Yuri Nosenko in Geneva in June 1962, Nosenko had independently mentioned the name "Zepp". Nosenko said that "Zepp" was an Indonesian military attaché whose conversation with American military attaché Leo Dulacki had been secretly recorded by the KGB. Bagley later concluded that Nosenko's story about the Indonesian officer was a fabrication and that Nosenko's reference to "Zepp" was actually connected to the earlier recording of Wynne and Penkovsky.

From this, Bagley inferred that the KGB had attached significance to the Wynne–Penkovsky conversation well before Penkovsky's arrest. He further reasoned that Wynne's question about a woman they had met in London would have appeared innocuous unless the KGB already suspected Penkovsky. Bagley therefore hypothesized that Penkovsky had been betrayed by a source within the CIA, MI6, or another part of Western intelligence, and that the KGB subsequently kept Penkovsky under surveillance while constructing a case against him that would not reveal the source of its original information.

Bagley's interpretation formed part of his broader belief that Nosenko was a KGB-controlled false defector. This interpretation was controversial within the CIA. A comprehensive CIA review completed in 1978 concluded that Penkovsky had not been under Soviet control during his work for the West and that the intelligence he supplied was genuine and valuable, while acknowledging uncertainty over precisely how he had been compromised.

Jack Dunlap, a United States Army sergeant assigned to the National Security Agency (NSA) who spied for the Soviet Union, also had access to some intelligence derived from Penkovsky. A later CIA historical account noted that Dunlap saw some Penkovsky-derived material, although it is uncertain whether the information available to him was sufficient to identify Penkovsky as its source. Claims that Dunlap directly betrayed Penkovsky have been disputed; a CIA review of intelligence literature described the assertion that Penkovsky was "sold out" by Dunlap and another Soviet source as "unlikely" and "undocumented".

Bagley instead argued that Penkovsky had been betrayed by an unidentified source within Western intelligence and that the KGB deliberately delayed his arrest while building a "discovery case" that would conceal how he had originally been compromised. The identity and even the existence of such an additional source remain uncertain.

== Repercussions ==
The Soviet public was first told of Penkovsky's arrest more than seven weeks later, when Pravda named Wynne and Jacob as his contacts, without naming anyone else.

In May 1963, after Penkovsky's trial, Izvestia reported that Varentsov, who had by then reached the rank of Chief Marshal of Artillery and served as Commander-in-Chief of the Rocket Forces and as a candidate member of the Central Committee, had been demoted to Major General. In June, he was expelled from the Central Committee for "having relaxed his political vigilance". Three other officers were also disciplined.

The head of the GRU, Ivan Serov, was dismissed during the same period. According to Oleg Gordievsky and Christopher Andrew, Serov had been on friendly terms with Penkovsky, a connection they identify as a likely factor in his fall.

== Portrayal in popular culture ==
Penkovsky was portrayed by Christopher Rozycki in the 1985 BBC Television serial Wynne and Penkovsky. His spying career was the subject of the first episode of the 2007 BBC Television docudrama Nuclear Secrets, titled "The Spy from Moscow", in which he was portrayed by Mark Bonnar. The programme featured original covert KGB footage showing Penkovsky photographing classified information and meeting Janet Chisholm, a British MI6 officer stationed in Moscow. It was broadcast on 15 January 2007.

Penkovsky was referred to in four of Tom Clancy's Jack Ryan espionage novels: The Hunt for Red October (1984), The Cardinal of the Kremlin (1988), The Bear and the Dragon (2000), and Red Rabbit (2002). In the Jack Ryan universe, he is described as the agent who recruited Colonel Mikhail Filitov as a CIA agent, code-named CARDINAL, and as having urged Filitov to betray him in order to solidify Filitov's position as the West's senior spy in the Soviet hierarchy. The "cremated alive" hypothesis also appears in several Clancy novels, although Clancy did not identify Penkovsky as the executed spy. Penkovsky's fate is also mentioned in the Nelson DeMille spy novel The Charm School (1988). A summary of Penkovsky’s spycraft, as well as its historical context, is covered in three paragraphs near the beginning of Chapter Four of The Devil’s Alternative (1979), a spy thriller by Frederick Forsyth.

Penkovsky was portrayed by Eduard Bezrodniy in the 2014 Polish thriller Jack Strong, about Ryszard Kukliński, another Cold War spy. His execution is depicted in the film's opening scene. Penkovsky was portrayed by Merab Ninidze in the 2020 British film The Courier, in which Benedict Cumberbatch played Greville Wynne.

== See also ==
- Gervase Cowell
- George Kisevalter
- Oleg Gordievsky
- List of KGB defectors

== Sources ==
- Duns, Jeremy (2014). Dead Drop: The True Story of Oleg Penkovsky and the Cold War's Most Dangerous Operation. London: Simon & Schuster. ISBN 9781849839297.
- Schecter, Jerrold L.; Deriabin, Peter S.; Penkovsky, Oleg V. (1992). The Spy Who Saved the World: How a Soviet Colonel Changed the Course of the Cold War. New York City: Charles Scribner's Sons. ISBN 978-0-684-19068-6. OCLC 909016158.
