= Greville Wynne =

British spy (1919–1990)

- Born: Greville Maynard Wynne; 19 March 1919; Shropshire, England
- Died: 28 February 1990 (aged 70); South Kensington, London, England
- Education: University of Nottingham
- Occupations: Electrical engineer; businessman
- Criminal charge: Espionage
- Criminal penalty: 8 years; served 18 months
- Criminal status: Released in exchange deal.
- Spouse(s): Sheila M Beaton (m. 1946; divorced); Johanna Herma Van Buren (m.1970; separated)
- Children: 1 son - Andrew
- Parent(s): Bert Wynne, Ada Wynne
- Espionage activity
- Country: United Kingdom
- Agency: Secret Intelligence Service (MI6)
- Service years: November 1960 – October 1962

Greville Maynard Wynne (19 March 1919 – 28 February 1990) was a British engineer and businessman recruited as a spy by MI6 because of his frequent travel to Eastern Europe. He acted as a courier to transport top-secret information to London from the Soviet agent Oleg Penkovsky.

Wynne and Penkovsky were both arrested by the KGB in November 1962, when some of the information their endeavours produced was of assistance to the West during the Cuban Missile Crisis. They were convicted of espionage. Penkovsky was executed the following year and Wynne was sentenced to eight years' imprisonment. He was detained at Lubyanka prison. Struggling with deteriorating health, he was released in 1964 in exchange for the Soviet spy Konon Molody.

== Early life ==
Wynne was born in Wrockwardine Wood, Telford, Shropshire, England, only son (an elder brother had died at the age of one year in 1915; he had three elder sisters) of Ethelbert Wynne and Ada, née Pritchard. He was raised in Ystrad Mynach, South Wales, with a "modest background". His father was a foreman in an engineering workshop. He struggled with dyslexia and left school at 14 to work for an electrical contractor. He then worked at a telephone factory as an apprentice. Before the Second World War he studied engineering part-time at the University of Nottingham. After the war, he traded in electrical equipment, travelling often through Europe and India. Wynne married Sheila Beaton in 1946; the couple had a son, Andrew, born in 1952. His business extended into Eastern Bloc countries from 1955.

== MI6 ==
In November 1960, Wynne was recruited by MI6 and asked to make a sales trip to Moscow, where he made contact with Oleg Penkovsky, a high-ranking GRU officer. Penkovsky had made earlier offers to spy for the West. Wynne later became an intermediary and courier for Penkovsky, smuggling top-secret Soviet intelligence to London on return from his frequent trips to the USSR.

Wynne's and Penkovsky's espionage activities were discovered by the KGB. Both men were arrested in November 1962, around the time of the Cuban Missile Crisis. Wynne and Penkovsky each pled guilty on 7 May 1963 and were sentenced four days later. Wynne was sentenced to eight years in prison. Penkovsky was sentenced to death and executed by firing squad, though Wynne believed he died by suicide in prison.

Wynne was held at the Lubyanka. In April 1964, amid British concerns for his deteriorating health, Wynne was released in exchange for the Soviet spy Konon Molody (also known as Gordon Lonsdale).

== Later life and death ==
After his release, Wynne returned to his business career. He and his wife Sheila divorced and he became estranged from his son and only child, Andrew. In 1970, Wynne married Johanna Herma Van Buren. They separated a few years before his death but were still legally married when he died.

On 23 May 1966, he appeared as himself in an episode of the American television series To Tell the Truth, receiving two of four possible votes.

Wynne struggled with depression and alcoholism in the aftermath of imprisonment. He died of throat cancer at the Cromwell Hospital in London on 28 February 1990, aged 70.

== Questions over pre-Penkovsky MI5 work ==
Later in life, Wynne wrote two books about his work for British intelligence: The Man from Moscow (1967) and The Man from Odessa (1981). In these books, Wynne claimed to have been recruited by MI5 as early as the Second World War, long before his work with Penkovsky. Historians question this account. The authors of The Spy Who Saved the World wrote that Wynne "had no previous intelligence experience or training." Others have made similar assessments, stating that Wynne was a civilian at the time of his recruitment by MI6 in 1960.

== Portrayal in popular culture ==
- Wynne was portrayed by David Calder in the 1985 BBC television serial Wynne and Penkovsky.
- He was portrayed by Peter Lindford in the 2007 BBC Television docudrama Nuclear Secrets.
- He was portrayed by Benedict Cumberbatch in the 2020 film The Courier.
