= John M. Newman =

American author and college professor

- Born: December 20, 1950 (age 75); Dayton, Ohio
- Military career
- Allegiance: United States
- Branch: United States Army

John Michael Newman Jr. (born December 20, 1950, Dayton, Ohio) is an American academic, author and retired major in the United States Army. Newman was on the faculty at the University of Maryland from 1995 to 2012, and has been a Political Science professor at James Madison University in Harrisonburg, Virginia since January 2013.

== Career ==
Newman served in the Armed Forces in Thailand, the Philippines, Japan, and China. He served as an attaché in China. He served as executive assistant to the director of the National Security Agency (NSA). He was a faculty member of the University of Maryland, Honors College (1992-2012), and is currently Adjunct Professor of Political Science at James Madison University, where he teaches courses in International Terrorism, Counterterrosm, and America in the 60s.

Newman was a consultant for Oliver Stone's film JFK (1991). In 1994 he was one of the experts called upon to testify before the JFK Assassination Records Review Board. He was interviewed for the 2021 documentary JFK Revisited: Through the Looking Glass.

=== JFK and Vietnam: Deception, Intrigue, and the Struggle for Power ===
In his book, JFK and Vietnam: Deception, Intrigue, and the Struggle for Power, Newman argues that United States President John F. Kennedy would not have placed combat troops in Vietnam and was preparing to withdraw military advisors by the end of 1965. Oliver Stone, director of the 1991 film JFK called it "a breakthrough exploration of Kennedy and his generals, [which] defines the 1961-1963 period in a light I never understood before". Arthur M. Schlesinger, Jr., a former special assistant to Kennedy, described it as "the most solid contribution yet" to speculation regarding the course of American history had the President not be assassinated. While calling it a "[b]old and authoritative revisionist analysis", Kirkus Reviews said "this electrifying report portrays a wily, stubborn, conflicted leader who grasped realities that eluded virtually everyone else in the US establishment." In the Los Angeles Times, historian Leonard Bushkoff wrote: "Newman's vision of warmongering hawks--a group of conspiratorial Washingtonians whose motives he barely examines--is indeed based more on suppositions and innuendoes than evidence. Nevertheless, at another, deeper level, Newman's points are highly persuasive."

In a critical review for The Baltimore Sun, Vietnam Magazine's editor Harry G. Summers Jr. said that Newman "uncritically accepts all the 'evidence' that supports his thesis that JFK actually was secretly planning to withdraw from Vietnam as soon as he was re-elected, and ignores all that does not." According to Summers, Newman "vilified Kennedy beyond the wildest dreams of his worst enemies" and "his chapter on the withdrawal decision turns JFK into a scheming politician, devoid of principle and devoted only to his re-election." Summers concluded: "By posing the issue [of what Kennedy would have done in Vietnam had he not been assassinated] in terms of deception and intrigue, 'JFK and Vietnam' doesn't give you a clue."

=== Oswald and the CIA ===
Based on the examination of 250,000 pages of government documents, Newman's 1995 book Oswald and the CIA presents the narrative that the "CIA had a keen operational interest in Lee Harvey Oswald from the day he defected to the Soviet Union in 1959 until the day he was murdered in the basement of the Dallas Police Department." Kirkus Reviews summarized it as: "Exhaustive, tedious, and diffuse, this study eschews sensationalism but threatens death by minutiae." Calling it a "meticulously documented expose" and a "heavily annotated tome", Publishers Weekly said Oswald and the CIA "reads like an intricate spy thriller [and] serves as a corrective to Norman Mailer's Oswald's Tale."

=== Uncovering Popov's Mole ===
In his 2022 book, Uncovering Popov's Mole, Newman reverses the claim he had made in the 2008 edition of Oswald and the CIA, i.e., that James Angleton had masterminded the assassination of President John F. Kennedy. In his new book, Newman says Bruce Leonard Solie in the mole-hunting Office of Security was not only Angleton's trusted confidant, father-figure, mentor and mole-hunting superior, but the KGB "mole" for whom Angleton was searching, as well. Newman says Solie sent (or duped Angleton into sending) Lee Harvey Oswald to Moscow in 1959 as an ostensible "dangle" in a planned-to-fail hunt for "Popov's Mole" (Solie) in the wrong part of the CIA -- the Soviet Russia Division.

== Publications ==
External audio
- "JFK and Vietnam." Interviewed by Roy Tuckman for Pacifica Radio on KPFK (February 19, 1992). 82 min.

=== Books ===
- JFK and Vietnam: Deception, Intrigue, and the Struggle for Power. New York: Warner Books (1992). ISBN 978-0446516785.
- Oswald and the CIA: The Documented Truth About the Unknown Relationship Between the U.S. Government and the Alleged Killer of JFK. New York: Carroll & Graf (1995). ISBN 978-0786701315.
- Quest for the Kingdom: The Secret Teachings of Jesus in the Light of Yogic Mysticism CreateSpace (2013). ISBN 978-1456317621.
- Where Angels Tread Lightly: The Assassination of President Kennedy, vol. I (2015).
  - Addendum to afterword.
- Countdown to Darkness: The Assassination of President Kennedy, vol. II (2017).
- Into the Storm: The Assassination of President Kennedy, vol. III (2019).
- Uncovering Popov's Mole: The Assassination of President Kennedy, vol. IV (2022).

==== Other ====
- Postscript to Summers, Anthony (1998). The Kennedy Conspiracy? (updated ed.). Warner Books.
