= Cold War (disambiguation) =

The Cold War (1947–1991) was a geopolitical, ideological, and economic struggle after World War II between the United States and the Soviet Union.

Cold War may also refer to:

== Conflicts ==
- Cold war (term)
- Phases of the Cold War:
  - Cold War (1947–1948)
  - Cold War (1948–1953)
  - Cold War (1953–1962)
  - Cold War (1962–1979)
  - Cold War (1979–1985)
  - Cold War (1985–1991)
- Middle Eastern Cold War (disambiguation)
- Second Cold War, a term used to describe the second iteration of the Cold War, this time between geopolitical blocs of the United States and European Union versus Russia and China

== Media ==
=== Film and television ===
- Cold War (1951 film), a Disney film starring Goofy
- Cold War (2012 film), a Hong Kong police thriller film
- Cold War (2018 film), a Polish film by Pawel Pawlikowski
- Cold War (TV series), a 1998 documentary series about the Cold War
- "Cold War" (Code Lyoko episode)
- "Cold War" (Doctor Who)
- "The Cold War" (Person of Interest)
- Temporal Cold War, a fictional conflict in the Star Trek universe

=== Literature ===
- "Cold War" (short story), a 1957 science fiction short story by Arthur C. Clarke
- "Cold War" (Predator), a 1991 science fiction comic storyline by Mark Verheiden, Ron Randall, and Steve Mitchell
- The Cold War: A World History, a book by Odd Arne Westad

=== Music ===
- Cold War (band), an American hardcore punk band
- "Cold War" (song), a 2010 song by Janelle Monáe
- "Cold War", a song by Death from Above 1979 from You're a Woman, I'm a Machine
- "Cold War", a song by Devo from Freedom of Choice
- "Cold War", a song by Myka Relocate from Lies to Light the Way
- "Cold War", a song by Styx from Kilroy Was Here

=== Video games ===
- Cold War (Star Wars), a fictional conflict in Star Wars: The Old Republic
- Cold War (video game), a 2005 computer game developed by Mindware Studios
- Toy Soldiers: Cold War, a 2011 XBLA game developed by Signal Studios
- Call of Duty: Black Ops Cold War, a video game in the Call of Duty series

== Other uses ==
- Cold War (ice hockey), an outdoor ice hockey game played in 2001
- The Big Chill at the Big House or Cold War II, an ice hockey game
- Cold War (board game), a 1984 board game published by Victory Games

== See also ==
- Cold Warrior (disambiguation)
- Cold Like War, a 2017 album by American band We Came as Romans
