= USS Langley (CV-1) =

First United States Navy aircraft carrier

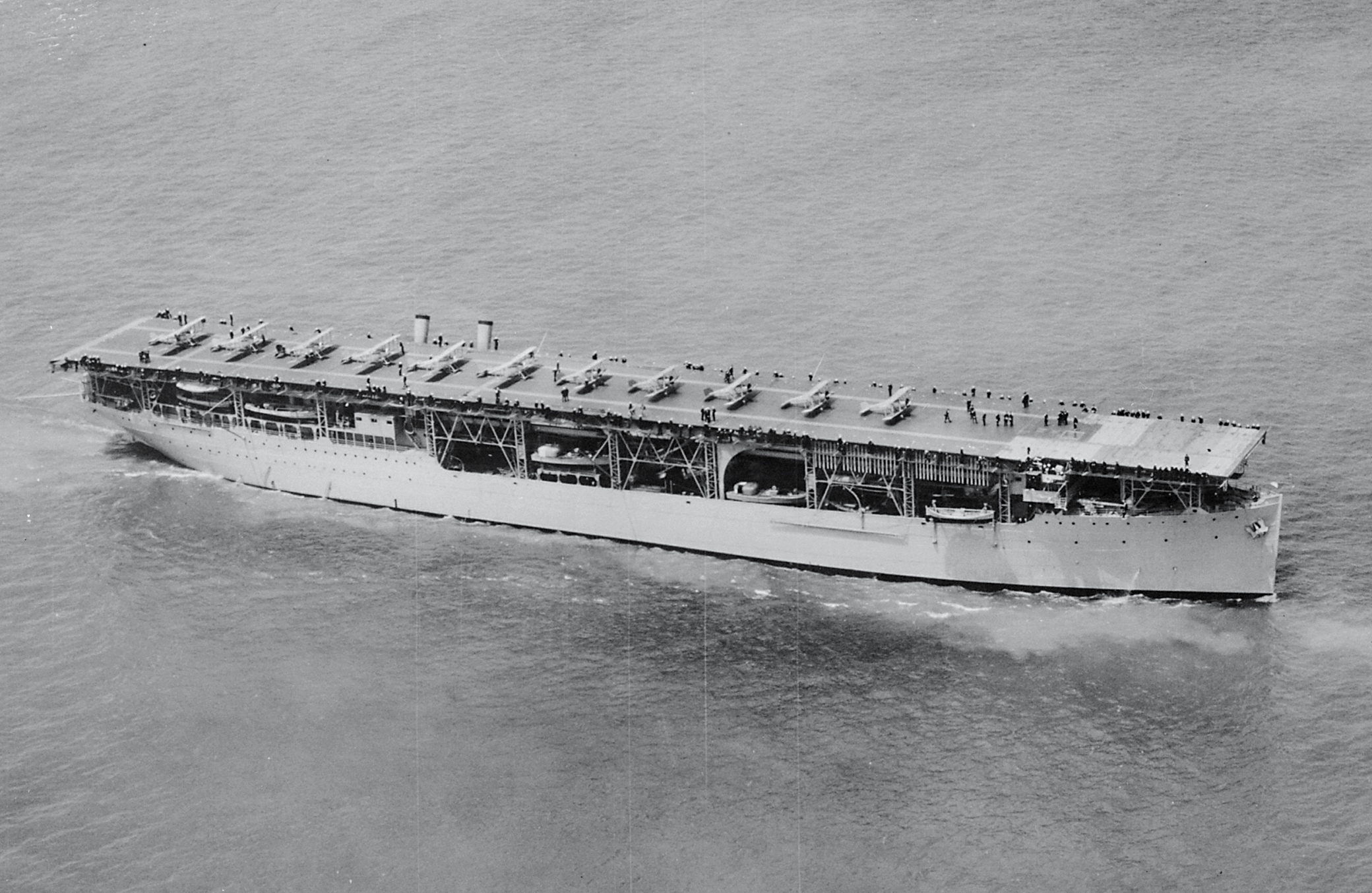
- USS Langley underway, 1927

History

United States
- Name: Jupiter (1912–1920); Langley (1920–1942)
- Namesake: Jupiter; Samuel Pierpont Langley
- Builder: Mare Island Naval Shipyard
- Laid down: 18 October 1911
- Launched: 24 August 1912
- Commissioned: 7 April 1913
- Decommissioned: 24 March 1920
- Recommissioned: 20 March 1922
- Decommissioned: 25 October 1936
- Recommissioned: 21 April 1937
- Renamed: Langley, 21 April 1920
- Reclassified: Fleet carrier CV-1, 17 July 1920; Seaplane tender AV-3, 21 April 1937
- Stricken: 8 May 1942
- Identification: AC-3; AV-1, 17 July 1920; AV-3, 21 April 1937
- Nickname(s): "Covered Wagon"
- Honors and awards: As Jupiter: Mexican Service Medal; World War I Victory Medal ("Transport" clasp); As Langley: American Defense Service Medal ("Fleet" clasp); Asiatic–Pacific Campaign Medal; World War II Victory Medal
- Fate: Scuttled after Japanese air attack off Java coast, 27 February 1942; 8°51′4″S 109°2′3″E
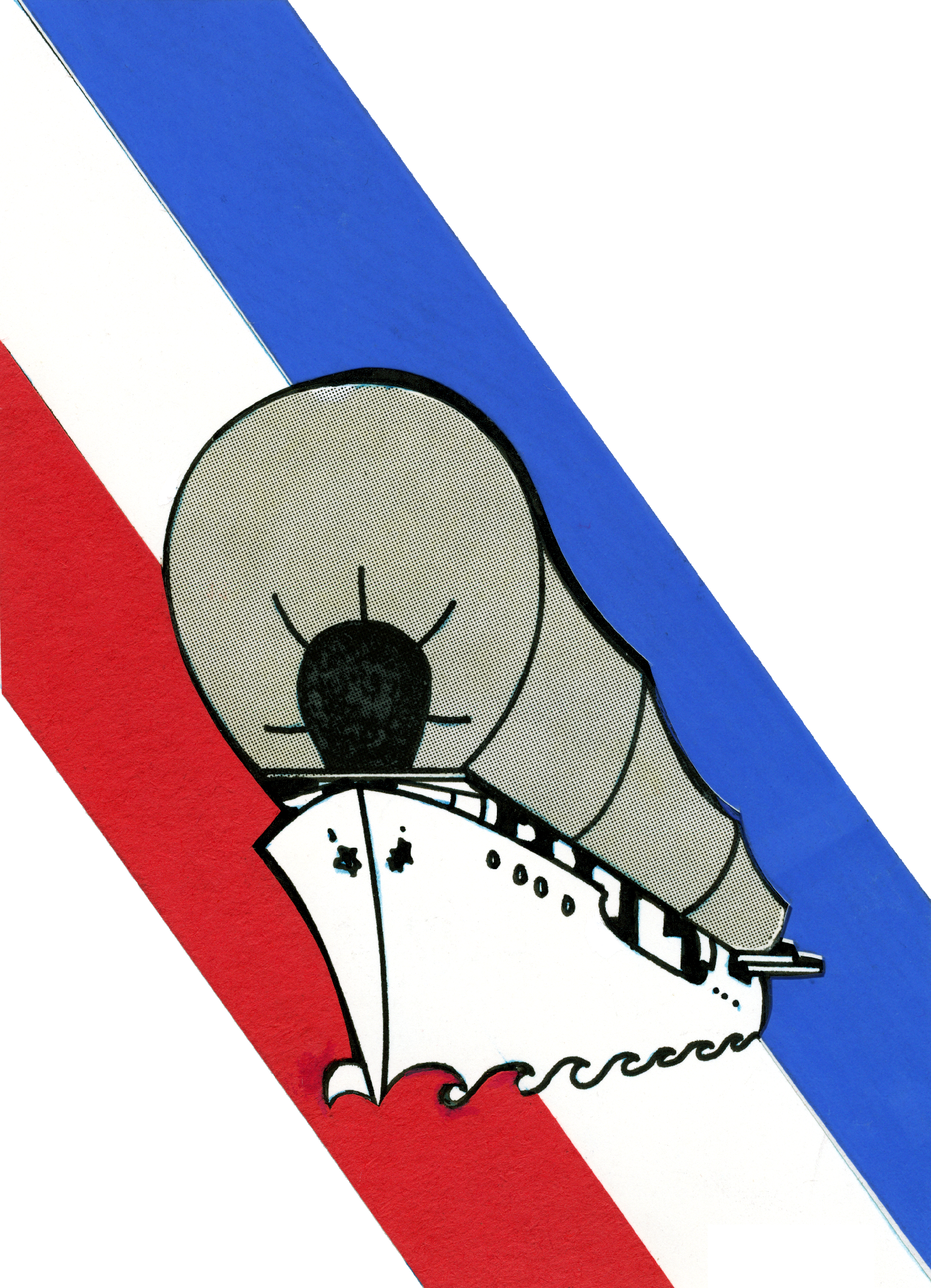
- Badge

Class overview
- Preceded by: N/A
- Succeeded by: Lexington class
- Planned: 2
- Completed: 1

General characteristics
- Class & type: Proteus-class collier; Langley-class aircraft carrier
- Displacement: 19,360 long tons (19,671 t) (as Jupiter); 12,700 long tons (12,904 t) (standard, as Langley); 13,900 long tons (14,123 t) (full load, as Langley)
- Length: 542 ft (165.2 m)
- Beam: 65 ft 5 in (19.9 m)
- Draft: 27 ft 8 in (8.4 m) (as Jupiter); 24 ft (7.3 m) (as Langley)
- Installed power: 3 × boilers; 7,200 shp (5,400 kW)
- Propulsion: 2 × shafts; turbine–electric powertrain
- Speed: 15.5 knots (28.7 km/h; 17.8 mph)
- Range: 3,500 nmi (6,500 km; 4,000 mi) at 10 knots (19 km/h; 12 mph)
- Complement: 163 officers and men (as Jupiter); 468 officers and men (as Langley)
- Armament: 4 × 4 in (102 mm)/50 cal guns (as Jupiter); 4 × 5 in (127 mm)/51 cal guns (as Langley); 4 × 5 in (127 mm)/51 cal guns, 4 x 3-inch AA at corners of flight deck, 4 x .50-cal machine guns (as sunk)
- Aircraft carried: None (as Jupiter); 36 (as Langley)
- Aviation facilities: 1 × elevator; 1 × catapult

USS Langley (CV-1/AV-3) was the United States Navy's first aircraft carrier, converted in 1920 from the collier USS Jupiter (Navy Fleet Collier No. 3), and also the US Navy's first turbine-electric ship. Langley was named after Samuel Langley, an American aviation pioneer. She was the sole member of her class to be rebuilt as a carrier. Conversion of another collier was planned but canceled when the Washington Naval Treaty required the cancellation of the partially built Lexington-class battlecruisers Lexington and Saratoga, freeing up their hulls for conversion into aircraft carriers. Following another conversion to a seaplane tender, Langley saw service in World War II. On 27 February 1942, while ferrying a cargo of USAAF P-40s to Java, she was attacked by nine twin-engine Japanese bombers of the Japanese 21st and 23rd naval air flotillas and so badly damaged that she had to be scuttled by her escorts.

== Construction ==
President William H. Taft attended the ceremony when Jupiter's keel was laid down on 18 October 1911, at the Mare Island Naval Shipyard in Vallejo, California. She was launched on 24 August 1912, sponsored by Mrs. Thomas F. Ruhm; and commissioned on 7 April 1913, under Commander Joseph M. Reeves. Her sister ships were Cyclops, which disappeared without a trace in World War I, Proteus, and Nereus, both of which disappeared on the same route as Cyclops in World War II.

Jupiter was the first turbo-electric-powered ship of the US Navy. Neptune had been built with a steam turbine and geared drive but performance was inferior to the earlier Cyclops with its two triple expansion steam engines. Jupiter's electric drive, designed by William Le Roy Emmet and built by the General Electric Company, consisted of two electric motors, each directly connected to a propeller shaft, powered by a single Curtis turbine and alternator set. At 2,000 rpm and 2,200 volts the set delivered a speed of 14 knots (26 km/h; 16 mph) with propellers at 110 rpm. There was also a weight saving with the turbo-electric drive being 156 tons versus the 280 tons of equivalent machinery for Cyclops.

== Service history ==
=== Collier ===
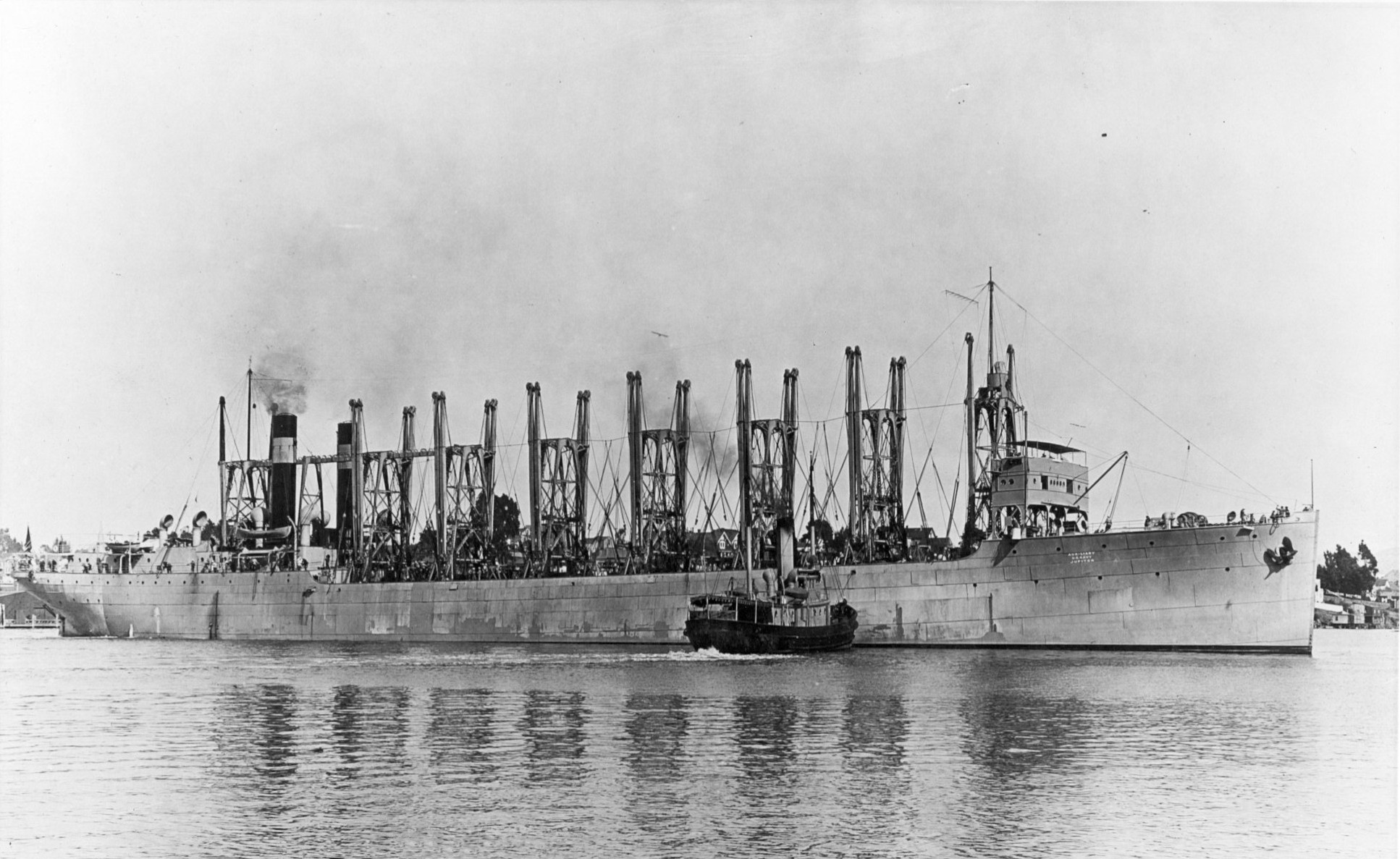
Jupiter at Mare Island, 16 October 1913

After successfully passing her sea trials Jupiter embarked a United States Marine Corps detachment at San Francisco, California, and reported to the Pacific Fleet at Mazatlán, Mexico, on 27 April 1914, bolstering US naval strength on the Mexican Pacific coast in the tense days of the Veracruz crisis. She remained on the Pacific coast until she departed for Philadelphia, on 10 October. En route, the collier steamed through the Panama Canal on Columbus Day, being the first vessel to transit it from the Pacific to the Atlantic.

Prior to America's entry into World War I, she cruised the Atlantic and Gulf of Mexico, attached to the Atlantic Fleet Auxiliary Division. The ship arrived at Norfolk, Virginia, on 6 April 1917, and was assigned to the Naval Overseas Transport Service, interrupted her coaling operations by two cargo voyages to France, in June 1917 and November 1918. The first voyage transported a naval aviation detachment of 7 officers and 122 men to England. It was the first US aviation detachment to arrive in Europe and was commanded by Lieutenant Kenneth Whiting, who became Langley's first executive officer five years later. Jupiter was back in Norfolk, on 23 January 1919, whence she sailed for Brest, France, on 8 March, for coaling duty in European waters to expedite the return of victorious veterans to the United States. Upon reaching Norfolk, on 17 August, the ship was transferred to the West Coast. Her conversion to an aircraft carrier was authorized on 11 July 1919, and she sailed to Hampton Roads, Virginia, on 12 December, where she was decommissioned on 24 March 1920.

=== Aircraft carrier ===
Jupiter was converted into the first US aircraft carrier at the Norfolk Naval Shipyard, Portsmouth, Virginia. On 11 April 1920, she was renamed Langley in honor of Samuel Pierpont Langley, an American astronomer, physicist, aeronautics pioneer and aircraft engineer, and she was given the hull number CV-1. By early 1921, memories of World War I were swaying public opinion away from warship construction toward disarmament. Article VIII of the Washington Naval Treaty provided an exemption for experimental aircraft carriers in existence or building on 12 November 1921. The Washington Naval Treaty was signed on 6 February 1922; and Langley was recommissioned on 20 March 1922 for the purpose of conducting experiments in seaborne aviation. The commanding officer was Commander Kenneth Whiting, who had first proposed conversion of a collier to the General Board of the United States Navy three years earlier. Langley was designed to carry up to 34 airplanes, e.g., 12 single-seaters, 12 two-seaters, and 10 "torpedo-dropping" aircraft.

As the first American aircraft carrier, Langley was the scene of several seminal events in US naval aviation. On 17 October 1922, Lt. Virgil C. Griffin piloted the first plane—a Vought VE-7—launched from her full-length wooden deck. Though this was not the first time an airplane had taken off from a ship, and though Langley was not the first ship with an installed flight deck, this one launching was of monumental importance to the modern US Navy. With Langley underway nine days later, Lieutenant Commander Godfrey de Courcelles Chevalier made the first landing, in an Aeromarine 39B. On 18 November, Commander Whiting was the first aviator to be catapulted from a carrier's deck.

An unusual feature of Langley was provision for a carrier pigeon house on the stern between the 5-inch guns. Pigeons had been carried aboard seaplanes for message transport since World War I, and were to be carried on aircraft operated from Langley. The pigeons were trained at the Norfolk Naval Shipyard while Langley was undergoing conversion. As long as the pigeons were released a few at a time for exercise, they returned to the ship; but when the whole flock was released while Langley was anchored off Tangier Island, the pigeons flew south and roosted in the cranes of the Norfolk shipyard. The pigeons never went to sea again and the former pigeon house became the executive officer's quarters; but the early plans for conversion of Lexington and Saratoga included compartments for pigeons.

By 15 January 1923, Langley had begun flight operations and tests in the Caribbean Sea for carrier landings. In June, she steamed to Washington, D.C., to give a demonstration at a flying exhibition before civil and military dignitaries. She arrived at Norfolk on 13 June, and commenced training along the Atlantic coast and Caribbean which carried her through the end of the year. This publicity cruise stopped at Bar Harbor, Maine, Portland, Maine, Portsmouth, New Hampshire, Gloucester, Massachusetts, Boston and New York City. After entering port and anchoring, Langley published a takeoff and landing schedule so interested civilians might watch. Although the aviators did some formation flying over the cities, people were more interested in watching the shipboard takeoffs and landings. The planes seldom attained flying speed on deck when taking off while the ship was at anchor with little or no wind, but the pilots were confident their Vought VE-7s could reach flying speed during the 52 ft (16 m) drop from the flight deck before reaching the water. In 1924, Langley participated in more maneuvers and exhibitions, and spent the summer at Norfolk for repairs and alterations, she departed for the West Coast late in the year and arrived in San Diego, California, on 29 November to join the Pacific Battle Fleet.

Captain Joseph Mason "Bull" Reeves, who commanded all fleet aircraft, went aboard the Langley in October 1925. During the 1925 maneuvers aboard the Langley, Reeves developed dive-bombing tactics to attack enemy ships.

In 1927, Langley was at the Guantanamo Bay Naval Base. For the next 12 years, she operated off the California coast and Hawaii, engaged in training fleet units, experimentation, pilot training, and tactical-fleet problems. Langley was featured in the 1929 silent film about naval aviation The Flying Fleet.

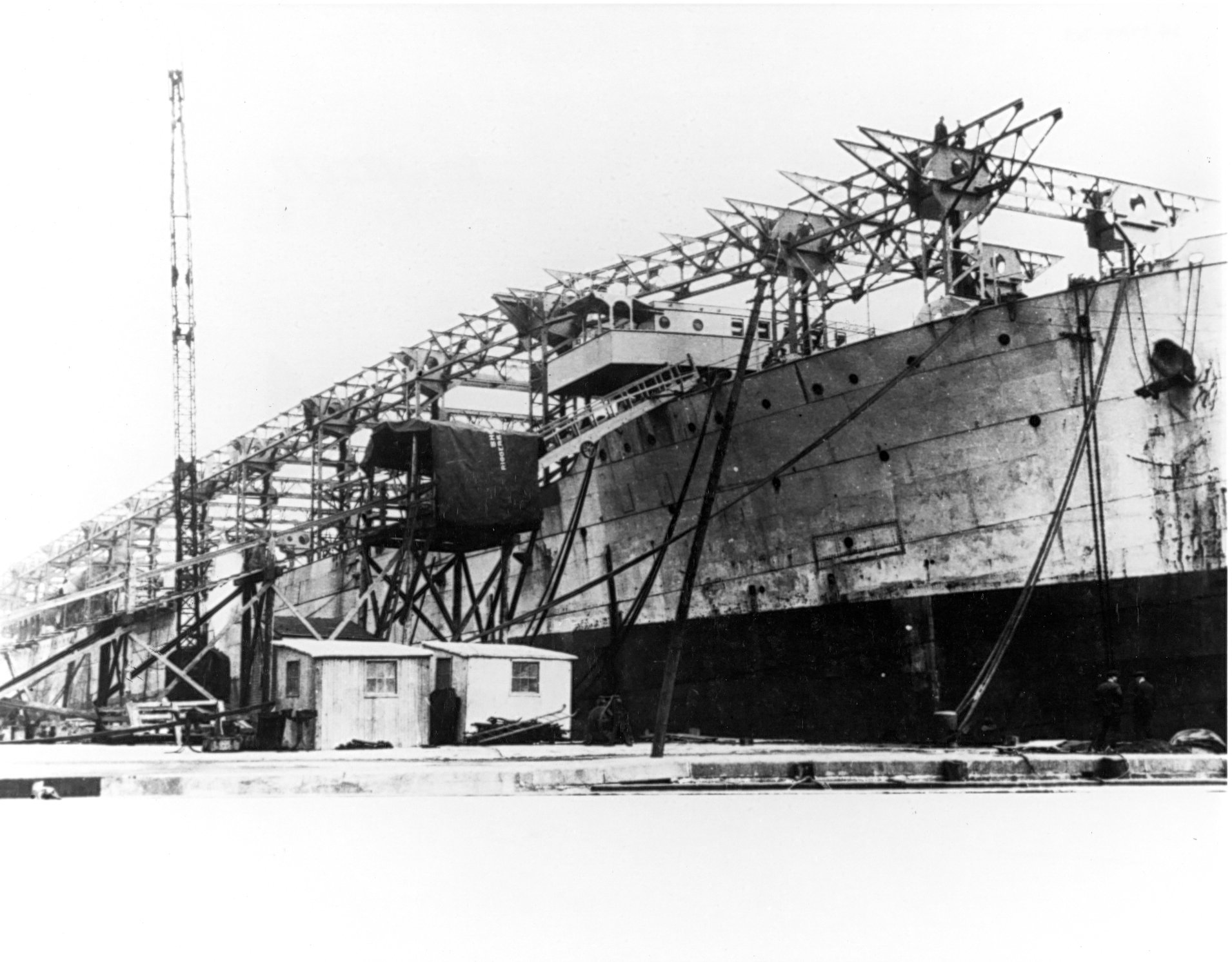
Langley being converted to an aircraft carrier at Norfolk Naval Shipyard, 1921

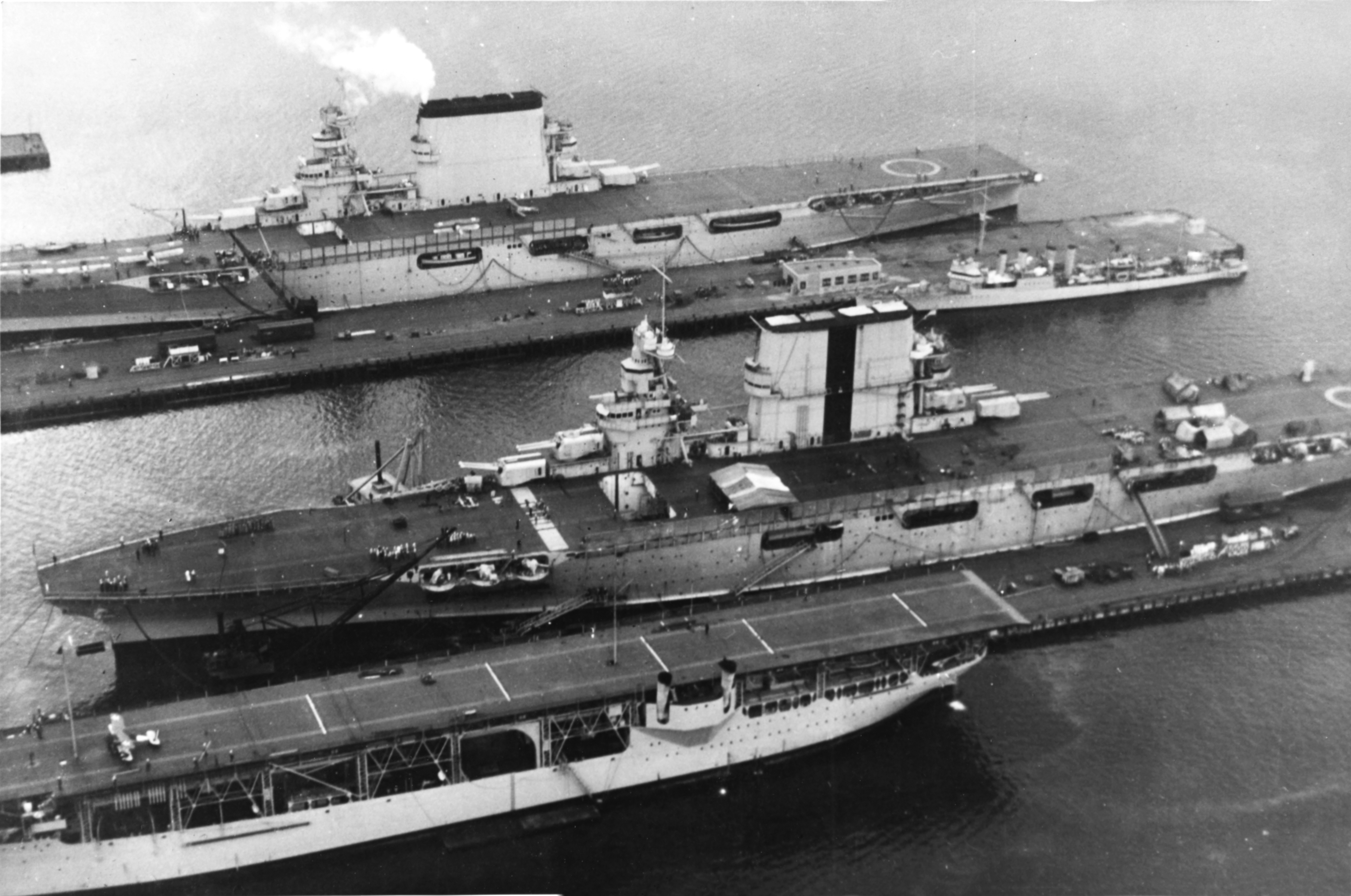
Langley at Puget Sound Navy Yard, immediately opposite Saratoga (with black stripe on funnel) and Lexington in 1929

=== Seaplane tender ===
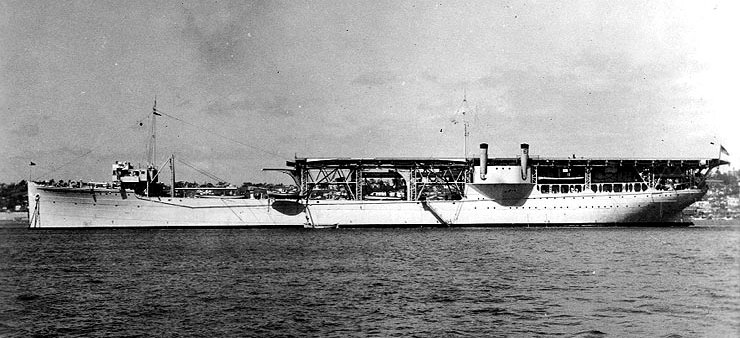
Langley after conversion to a seaplane tender, 1937

On 25 October 1936, she put into Mare Island Navy Yard, California for overhaul and conversion to a seaplane tender. Though her career as a carrier had ended, her well-trained pilots had proved invaluable to the next two carriers, Lexington and Saratoga (commissioned on 14 December and 16 November 1927, respectively).

Langley completed conversion on 26 February 1937 and was assigned hull number AV-3 on 11 April. She was assigned to the Aircraft Scouting Force and commenced her tending operations out of Seattle, Washington, Sitka, Alaska, Pearl Harbor, and San Diego, California. She departed for a brief deployment with the Atlantic Fleet from 1 February–10 July 1939, and then steamed to assume duties with the Asiatic Fleet at Manila arriving on 24 September.

=== World War II ===
On the entry of the US into World War II, Langley was anchored off Cavite, Philippines. On 8 December, following the invasion of the Philippines by Japan, she departed Cavite for Balikpapan in the Dutch East Indies. In the natural state of alarm (the attack on Pearl Harbor had happened the day before) 300 rounds were shot at an object in the sky before it was realized that it was the planet Venus. As the Japanese advance continued, Langley proceeded to Australia, arriving in Darwin on 1 January 1942. She then became part of the American-British-Dutch-Australian Command (ABDACOM) naval forces. Until 11 January, Langley assisted the Royal Australian Air Force in running anti-submarine patrols from Darwin.

Langley went to Fremantle to pick up a cargo of 32 P-40 fighters of the Far East Air Force's 13th Pursuit Squadron (Provisional), along with 33 U.S. Army Air Force (USAAF) pilots and 12 ground crew. At Fremantle, Langley and the cargo ship Sea Witch (loaded with an additional 27 unassembled and crated P-40s), joined Convoy MS.5 which had just arrived from Melbourne bound for Colombo, Ceylon with troops and supplies eventually destined for India and Burma. The convoy was composed of the United States Army Transport Willard A. Holbrook and the Australian troop transports Duntroon and Katoomba, escorted by the light cruiser USS Phoenix. As late as 21 February the original orders from HQ SW Pacific Command stated that the convoy would be going to Bombay, India. On that same day, however, during another conference the sailing orders were changed again. According to the War Diary of Phoenix both Langley and Sea Witch were to steam for Java port, Tjilatjap "...without escort." MS.5 departed Fremantle at noon on 22 February. En route to Colombo, Langley was directed on 23 February by CZM (Helfrich) via the ACNB (Australian Commonwealth Naval Board) to leave the convoy prematurely and proceed individually to deliver the planes to Tjilatjap, Java. Unfortunately the RNN (Helfrich) and USN (Glassford) had not communicated successfully about her escort arrangements, and the resulting confusion would doom the tender. Late on 26 February Langley was informed that a Dutch patrol plane would meet her and direct her to the Dutch "destroyer" (actually a minelayer) Willem van der Zaan which would act as her escort. Another plane was to be overhead on the next day (27 February) as well. As it turned out, Willem van der Zaan was suffering from boiler problems and incapable of more than 10 knots--slower than Langley--so the tender's skipper (CDR McConnell) decided to proceed alone at 13 knots toward Tjilatjap, Java. It was hoped she could get to the island under the cover of darkness, as her slow speed and lack of escort made her extremely vulnerable to enemy air or submarine units.

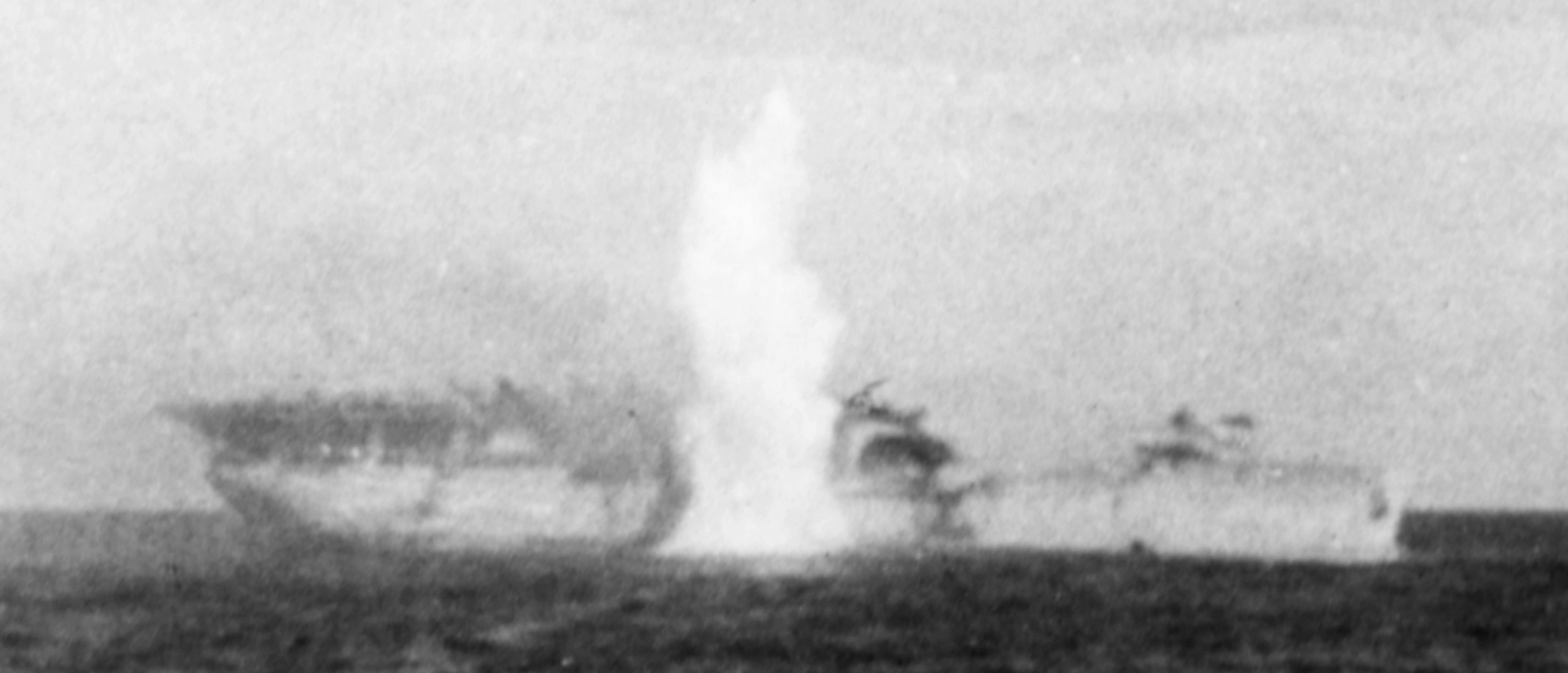
Langley scuttled via torpedo on 27 February 1942 off Java

In the early hours of 27 February, Langley rendezvoused with the destroyers USS Whipple and USS Edsall, which had been sent from Tjilatjap to escort her. Later that morning, a Japanese reconnaissance aircraft located the formation. At 11:40, about 75 nautical miles (139 km; 86 mi) south of Tjilatjap, the seaplane tender, along with Edsall and Whipple were attacked by sixteen Mitsubishi G4M "Betty" bombers of the Imperial Japanese Navy Air Service's Takao Kōkūtai, 23rd Air Flotilla, led by Lieutenant Jiro Adachi, flying out of Denpasar airfield on Bali, and escorted by fifteen A6M2 Reisen fighters of 3rd Air Group. Rather than dropping all their bombs at once, the Japanese bombers attacked releasing partial salvos. Since they were level bombing from medium altitude, Langley was able to alter helm when the bombs were released and evade the first and second bombing passes, but the bombers changed their tactics on the third pass and bracketed all the directions Langley could turn. As a result, Langley took five hits from a mix of 60-and-250-kilogram (130 and 550 lb) bombs as well as three near misses, with 16 crewmen killed. (Note: Some English language sources rely on Roscoe which incorrectly attributes the attack to nine Aichi D3A1 "Val" dive bombers of the Japanese 21st and 23rd naval air flotillas, however Langley's own action report (no longer available online?) cited the attackers as twin-engined horizontal bombers, which the report compared to German Junkers Ju 86 bombers; and the multiple passes taken would be impossible for dive bombers with a single bomb each, to carry out.) The topside burst into flames, steering was impaired, and the ship developed a 10° list to port. Langley went dead in the water as her engine room flooded. At 13:32, the order to abandon ship was passed.

After taking off the surviving crew and passengers (Whipple rescued 308 men and Edsall 177) at 13:58, the escorting destroyers stood off and began firing nine 4-inch (102 mm) shells and two torpedoes into Langley's hull at 14:29 to prevent her from falling into enemy hands, abandoning her at approximately 08°51′04″S 109°02′03″E. The tender was described in a subsequent message to have been on fire with a heavy list to port when abandoned, but not observed by anyone on Whipple or Edsall to actually sink. After being transferred to the oiler USS Pecos, many of Langley's crew were lost when Pecos was sunk en route to Australia by Japanese carrier aircraft. Out of over 630 total crewmen and Langley survivors on Pecos, 232 were rescued while more than 400 were left behind and died due to Japanese submarines in the area hindering rescue efforts. Exact casualty numbers for the doomed ships of the United States Asiatic Fleet and American-British-Dutch-Australian Command are impossible to gather because so many Allied warships were sunk in the Dutch East Indies campaign (at least 24 total) and many of those ships had already picked up survivors of other sunken ships and then were also sunk by the Japanese hours or days later. Thirty-one of the thirty-three pilots assigned to the USAAF 13th Pursuit Squadron (Provisional) being transported by Langley remained on Edsall to be brought to Tjilatjap, but were lost when she was sunk on the same day by Japanese warships while responding to the distress calls of Pecos. According to the Bureau of Naval Personnel a total of 288 U.S. Navy officers and crewmen from Langley were missing in action and later declared dead following the sinking of Langley and Pecos. Including the 31 USAAF pilots that were originally on Langley a total of 319 from Langley were killed.

== Awards and decorations ==
As Jupiter

Mexican Service Medal	World War I Victory Medal with "Transport" clasp

As Langley

American Defense Service Medal with "Fleet" clasp	Asiatic-Pacific Campaign Medal with 2 stars	World War II Victory Medal

USS Langley (as AV-3) earned two battle stars on its Asiatic-Pacific Campaign Streamer: One for the Philippine Islands Operation, 8 December 1941 – 6 May 1942; and one for Netherlands East Indies Engagements, 23 January – 27 February 1942.

== See also ==
- HMS Argus

== Citations ==
=== Bibliography ===
- "USS Langley (CV-1) (formerly Jupiter (Collier #3); later AV-3)". NavSource. 10 July 2016.
- Ford, Roger; Gibbons, Tony; Hewson, Rob; Jackson, Bob; Ross, David (2001). The Encyclopedia of Ships. London: Amber Books Ltd. p. 330. ISBN 978-1-905704-43-9.
- Gill, G. Hermon (1957). Royal Australian Navy 1939–1942. Australia in the War of 1939–1945. Series 2 – Navy. Vol. 1. Canberra: Australian War Memorial. LCCN 58037940. Archived from the original on 25 May 2009.
- JASNE (1912). "Electric Drive on Collier". Journal of the American Society of Naval Engineers, Inc. 24. Washington, DC: American Society of Naval Engineers. Archived from the original on 20 March 2024.
- Kehn, Jr. Donald M. (2017) In the Highest Degree Tragic: the Sacrifice of the U.S. Asiatic Fleet in the East Indies during World War II. Potomac Books/Univ. of Nebraska Press.
- Messimer, Dwight (1983). Pawns of War: The Loss of the USS Langley and the USS Pecos. Annapolis, MD: United States Naval Institute.
- Pride, A.M. (January 1979). "Comment and Discussion". Proceedings. p. 89.
- Roscoe, Theodore (1984) [1953]. United States Destroyer Operations In World War II. Annapolis, MD: United States Naval Institute. ISBN 0-87021-726-7.
- Tagaya, Osamu (2001). Mitsubishi Type 1 Rikko Betty Units of World War 2. Bloomsbury US. ISBN 1-84176-082-X.
- Tate, Jackson R. RADM USN (October 1978). "We Rode the Covered Wagon". Proceedings. pp. 62–69.
- "A Brief History of U.S. Navy Aircraft Carriers Part IIa – The War Years (1941–1942) Website of the United States Navy". 15 June 2009. Archived from the original on 26 August 2013.
- "The Java Sea Campaign Combat Narratives". Office of Naval Intelligence – United States Navy. 1943. Archived from the original on 14 December 2021.
