= USS Cyclops =

United States navy ship lost at sea in 1918

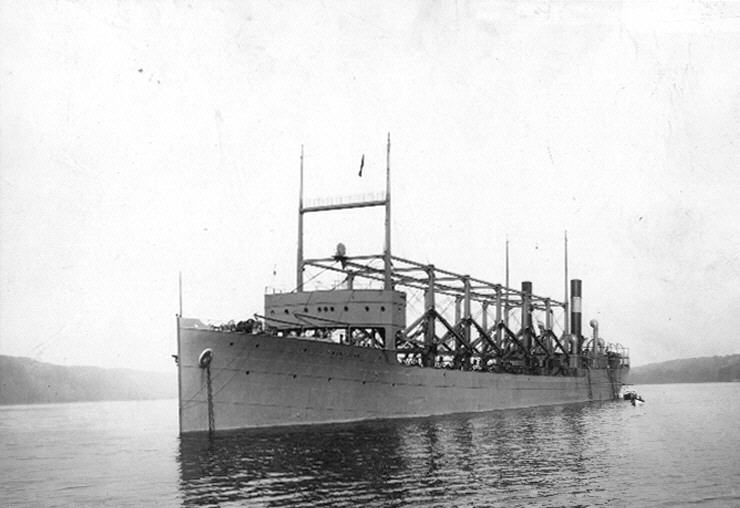
- USS Cyclops on the Hudson River in 1911

History

United States
- Name: Cyclops
- Namesake: Cyclops
- Builder: William Cramp & Sons, Philadelphia
- Yard number: 355
- Launched: 7 May 1910
- Commissioned: 1 May 1917
- Fate: Lost at sea, March 1918

General characteristics
- Class & type: Proteus-class collier
- Displacement: 19,360 long tons (19,671 t) full
- Length: 542 ft (165 m)
- Beam: 65 ft (20 m)
- Draft: 27 ft 8 in (8.43 m)
- Propulsion: 2 x coal-fired boiler; 2 x vertical triple-expansion reciprocating steam engine; 2 x shafts
- Speed: 15 kn (28 km/h; 17 mph)
- Capacity: 8,000 long tons (8,128 t) normal maximum; 10,800 long tons (10,973 t) maximum overload
- Complement: 236 officers and enlisted
- Armament: 4 × 4 in (100 mm) guns

USS Cyclops (AC-4) was the second of four Proteus-class colliers built for the United States Navy several years before World War I. Named after the Cyclops, a race of giants from Greek mythology, she was the second U.S. naval vessel to bear the name. The loss of the ship and 306 crew and passengers without a trace occurred sometime after March 4, 1918.

As the loss occurred during World War I, she was thought to have been captured or sunk by a German raider or submarine because she was carrying 10,800 long tons (10,973 t) of manganese ore used to produce munitions, but German authorities at the time subsequently denied any knowledge of the vessel. The Naval History & Heritage Command has stated she "probably sank in an unexpected storm", but the cause of the ship's loss is not known. To date, hers is considered one of the largest non-combat losses of any ship operated by the United States Navy, second only to the loss of USS Insurgent in 1800.

== History ==
Cyclops was launched on May 7, 1910, by William Cramp & Sons of Philadelphia and placed in service on November 7, 1910. Operating with the Naval Auxiliary Service, Atlantic Fleet, she voyaged in the Baltic from May to July 1911 to supply Second Division ships. Returning to Norfolk, Virginia, she operated on the east coast from Newport, Rhode Island, to the Caribbean, servicing the fleet. During the United States occupation of Veracruz in Mexico in 1914 and 1915, she coaled ships on patrol there and received the thanks of the U.S. Department of State for cooperation in evacuating refugees.

With American entry into World War I, Cyclops was commissioned on May 1, 1917. She joined a convoy for Saint-Nazaire, France, in June 1917, returning to the U.S. in July. Except for a voyage to Halifax, Nova Scotia, she served along the East Coast until January 9, 1918, when she was assigned to the Naval Overseas Transportation Service. She then sailed to Brazilian waters to fuel British ships in the South Atlantic, receiving the thanks of the U.S. State Department and Commander-in-Chief, Pacific.

=== Disappearance ===
The ship put to sea from Rio de Janeiro on February 16, 1918, and entered Salvador on February 20th. Two days later, she departed for Baltimore, Maryland, with no stops scheduled, carrying the manganese ore. The ship was thought to be overloaded when she left Brazil, as her maximum capacity was 8,000 long tons (8,128 t). Before leaving port, Commander Worley had submitted a report that the starboard engine had a cracked cylinder and was not operative. This report was confirmed by a survey board, which recommended, however, that the ship be returned to the United States. She made an unscheduled stop in Barbados because the water level was over the Plimsoll line, indicating that she was overloaded, but investigations in Rio proved the ship had been loaded and secured properly. Cyclops then set out for Baltimore on March 4th, and was rumored to have been sighted on March 9th by the molasses tanker Amolco near Virginia, but this was denied by Amolco's captain. Additionally, because Cyclops was not due in Baltimore until March 13th, the ship was highly unlikely to have been near Virginia on March 9th, as that location would have placed her only about a day from Baltimore. In any event, Cyclops never arrived in Baltimore, and no wreckage of the ship has ever been found.

=== Aftermath ===
That Cyclops was overdue and feared lost was front-page news in various American newspapers on April 15, 1918, following an announcement by the Navy.

On June 1, 1918, Assistant Secretary of the Navy Franklin D. Roosevelt declared Cyclops to be officially lost, and all hands deceased. (Note: Newspapers reported that Cyclops was declared officially lost in late August 1918 by Secretary of the Navy Josephus Daniels.) The loss of Cyclops was noted in the Annual Report of the Secretary of the Navy for 1918.

One of the seamen lost aboard Cyclops was African-American mess attendant Lewis H. Hardwick, the father of Herbert Lewis Hardwick, "The Cocoa Kid", an Afro-Puerto Rican welterweight boxer who was a top contender in the 1930s and 1940s, who won the world colored welterweight and world colored middleweight championships.

=== Possible explanations ===
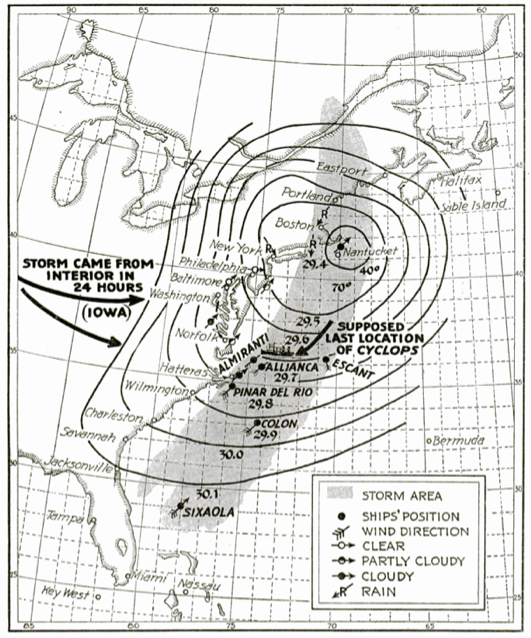
A map prepared by the U.S. Weather Bureau and published in the June 1929 issue of Popular Science Monthly, showing weather conditions at the time the Cyclops was lost

As Cyclops disappeared during World War I, and submarines of the Imperial German Navy were known to operate in the West Indies, the ship being lost due to hostile action was considered. However, the German navy denied any involvement, or having even seen Cyclops, both during and after the war.

Reports indicate that on March 10th, the day after Cyclops was rumored to have been sighted by Amolco, a violent storm swept through the Virginia Capes area. While some suggest that the combination of the overloaded condition, engine trouble, and bad weather may have conspired to sink Cyclops, an extensive naval investigation concluded: "Many theories have been advanced, but none that satisfactorily accounts for her disappearance." This summation was written, however, before two of Cyclops's sister ships, Proteus and Nereus, vanished at sea during World War II less than a year after their sale to civilian operators. Both ships were transporting heavy loads of metallic ore similar to that which was loaded on Cyclops during her fatal voyage. In both cases, their loss was theorized to have been the result of catastrophic structural failure, but a more outlandish theory attributes all three vessels' disappearances to the Bermuda Triangle.

Rear Admiral George van Deurs suggested that the loss of Cyclops could be owing to structural failure, as her sister ships suffered from issues where the I-beams that ran the length of the ship had eroded due to the corrosive nature of some of the cargo carried. This was observed definitively on USS Jason, and is believed to have contributed to the sinking of another similar freighter, Chuky, which snapped in two in calm seas. Moreover, Cyclops may have hit a storm with 30–40-knot (56–74 km/h; 35–46 mph) winds. These would have resulted in waves just far enough apart to leave the bow and stern supported on the peaks of successive waves, but with the middle unsupported, resulting in extra strain on the already weakened central area. (Note: In 1929, the Popular Science Monthly story research found that Cyclops had probably been lost in a storm. Separately, Larry Kusche, author of The Bermuda Triangle Mystery – Solved (1975), came to the same conclusion.)

For a BBC Radio 4 documentary in 2009, Tom Mangold had an expert from Lloyd's investigate the loss of Cyclops. The expert noted that manganese ore, being much denser than coal, had room to move within the holds even when fully laden, the hatch covers were canvas, and that when wet, the ore can become a slurry. As such, the load could shift and cause the ship to list. Combined with a possible loss of power from its one engine, it could founder in bad weather.

== The captain ==
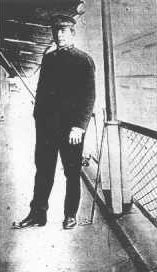
Lieutenant Commander George W. Worley, United States Naval Reserve

Investigations by the Office of Naval Intelligence revealed that Captain Worley was born Johan Frederick Wichmann in Sandstedt, Hanover, Germany, in 1862 (the official Navy Register lists his date of birth as December 11, 1865), and that he had entered North America by jumping ship in San Francisco in 1878. By 1898, he had changed his name to Worley (after a seaman friend), and owned and operated a saloon in San Francisco's Barbary Coast. He also got help from brothers, whom he had convinced to emigrate. During this time, he had qualified for the position of ship's master, and had commanded several civilian merchant ships, picking up and delivering cargo (both legal and illegal; some accounts say opium) from the Far East to San Francisco. The crews of these ships reported that Worley suffered from a personality allegedly akin to that sometimes ascribed to HMS Pandora's captain Edward Edwards, with the crew often being brutalized by Worley for trivial things. Worley was commissioned as a lieutenant commander in the Naval Auxiliary Reserve on February 21, 1917.

Naval investigators discovered information from former crew members about Worley's habits. He would berate and curse officers and men for minor offenses, sometimes getting violent; at one point, he had allegedly chased an ensign about the ship with a pistol. Saner times found him making his rounds about the ship dressed in long underwear and a derby hat. Worley sometimes would have an inexperienced officer take charge of loading cargo onto the ship while a more experienced man was confined to quarters. In Rio de Janeiro, one such man was assigned to oversee the loading of manganese ore, something a collier was not used to carrying, and in this instance the ship may have been overloaded, which may have contributed to her sinking. The most serious accusation against Worley was that he was pro-German in wartime and may have colluded with the enemy; indeed, his closest friends and associates were either German or Americans of German descent. "Many Germanic names appear," Livingston stated, speculating that the ship had many German sympathizers on board. One of the passengers on the final voyage was Alfred Louis Moreau Gottschalk, the consul-general in Rio de Janeiro, who was as roundly hated for his pro-German sympathies, as was Worley. Livingston stated he believed Gottschalk may have been directly involved in collaborating with Worley on handing the ship over to the Germans. After World War I, German records were checked to ascertain the fate of Cyclops, whether by Worley's hand or by submarine attack. Nothing was found.

Near the time the search for Cyclops was called off, a telegram was received by the State Department from Charles Ludlow Livingston, the U.S. consul on Barbados:

Secretary of State
Washington, D.C.
17,, 2 April p.m.
Department's 15th. Confidential. Master CYCLOPS stated that required six hundred tons coal having sufficient on board to reach Bermuda. Engines very poor condition. Not sufficient funds and therefore requested payment by me. Unusually reticent. I have ascertained he took here ton fresh meat, ton flour, thousand pounds vegetables, paying therefore 775 dollars. From different sources gather the following: he had plenty of coal, alleged inferior, took coal to mix, probably had more than fifteen hundred tons. Master alluded to by others as damned Dutchman, apparently disliked by other officers. Rumored disturbances en route hither, men confined and one executed; also had some prisoners from the fleet in Brazilian waters, one life sentence. United States Consul-General Gottschalk passenger, 231 crew exclusive of officers and passengers. Have names of crew but not of all the officers and passengers. Many Germanic names appear. Number telegraphic or wireless messages addressed to master or in care of ship were delivered at this port. All telegrams for Barbados on file head office St. Thomas. I have to suggest scrutiny there. While not having any definite grounds I fear fate worse than sinking though possibly based on instinctive dislike felt towards master.

LIVINGSTON, CONSUL.

Some reports attribute the telegram to Brockholst Livingston, but he was actually the 13-year-old son of the consul.

== Sister ships ==
Cyclops had three sister ships, all commissioned in 1913, which were all ill-fated.

- USS Jupiter was a military ship converted to an aircraft carrier between 1920 and 1922 and was recommissioned as USS Langley. Langley was the first American aircraft carrier and was vital in developing United States naval aviation capabilities. She was converted again between 1936 and 1937 as a seaplane tender and redesignated as AV-3. She was stationed in the Philippines in December 1941 and departed for Australia following the Japanese attacks on Pearl Harbor and the Philippines. On February 27, 1942, while ferrying fighter planes to Southeast Asia, she was attacked by Japanese aircraft and was hit by five bombs, causing critical damage. After her surviving crew members were rescued, Langley was scuttled by torpedoes fired by her escorting destroyers.
- USS Proteus was sold on March 8, 1941, became part of the Canadian Merchant Navy, and was lost at sea without a trace, probably in or near the Caribbean Sea, sometime after November 25, 1941 with a load of bauxite ore.
- USS Nereus was sold to the Aluminium Company of Canada on February 27, 1941. She was lost without a trace after departing Saint Thomas, U.S. Virgin Islands, sometime after December 10, 1941, with a load of bauxite ore.

== USS Cyclops in fiction ==
In 1986, Clive Cussler's Dirk Pitt novel Cyclops depicts Pitt finding the wreck of the USS Cyclops.

In the Quantum Leap episode "Ghost Ship" a former WW2 pilot tells Sam Beckett he was picked up by USS Cyclops when his squadron crashed during a storm in the Bermuda Triangle before itself was sunk with him as the only survivor; Al reveals the ship was from the First World War.

The USS Cyclops also makes a brief appearance in the 2010 action-adventure game Dark Void. The narrative of the game reveals that the Cyclops was a victim of the Bermuda Triangle.

The ship is referenced in the 2019 horror-adventure game The Sinking City. Charles Winfield Reed, the game's protagonist, served on the USS Cyclops as a sailor and diver before her mysterious sinking, of which he is the sole survivor. Its loss at sea is hinted to have been caused by the otherworldly events which cause Charles to see visions. The ship's sinking and Reed's subsequent experiences prior to the game's beginning also closely mirror that of the unnamed protagonist of the H. P. Lovecraft short story "Dagon."

The USS Cyclops is encountered in the first episode of the 2005 television miniseries, The Triangle. In the story, a team of four experts is assembled by a shipping magnate to investigate the mysterious disappearance of some of his vessels. The team discovers the sunken wreck of the Cyclops whilst conducting research in the Bermuda Triangle aboard a submarine.

A ship implied to be the USS Cyclops also appears in the 2006 animated movie Scooby-Doo! Pirates Ahoy! It is shown in a scene where the main protagonists are about to enter the heart of the Bermuda Triangle, so the movie seems to suggest that the disappearance of the ship is linked to the mystical, supernatural powers and the legends of the Bermuda Triangle. As it passes by the ship carrying the protagonists, it is confirmed by Velma to be the Cyclops.

== See also ==
- List of missing ships

== Sources ==
- "AC-4 Cyclops". Service Ship Photo Archive.
- NUMA site and Clive Cussler's brief report on Cyclops.
- Barrash, Marvin. U.S.S. Cyclops (2010). Westminster, MD: Heritage Books 2010. ISBN 0788451863

Newspaper articles of 1918

- "Cold High Winds Do $25,000 Damage'" Washington Post, 11 March 1918
- "Collier Overdue A Month", The New York Times, 15 April 1918
- "More Ships Hunt For Missing Cyclops", The New York Times, 16 April 1918
- "Haven't Given Up Hope For Cyclops", The New York Times, 17 April 1918
- "Collier Cyclops Is Lost; 293 Persons on Board; Enemy Blow Suspected", The Washington Post, 15 April 1918
- "U.S. Consul Gottschalk Coming To Enter The War", The Washington Post, 15 April 1918
- "Cyclops Skipper Teuton, 'Tis Said", The Washington Post, 16 April 1918
- "Fate of Ship Baffles", The Washington Post, 16 April 1918
- "Steamer Met Gale on Cyclops' Course", The Washington Post, 19 April 1918

Newspaper articles after 1918

- "Navy Believes Cyclops' Fate Is Cleared Up". The St. Petersburg Times. 1929.
- "Navy Probes 12-Year Mystery of Sinking of Cyclops". The Southeast Missourian. 1930.
- "The Cyclops Vanished". The Age. 7 October 1939.
- Wynne, Vance (1942). "The Mystery of the Cyclops". Pittsburgh Post-Gazette.
- "Navy Reopens Search". Sarasota Journal. 1973.
- "Has Cyclops been found?". The Free Lance-Star. 1973.
- "USS Cyclops details unlock the mysteries of the Bermuda Triangle". Upside Chronicles. 2021.
