= Cold Warrior (disambiguation) =

A Cold Warrior is an active participant in the Cold War.

Cold Warrior or Cold Warriors may also refer to:

- Cold Warrior (TV series), a 1984 British television series
- "Cold Warriors", an episode of Futurama
- Cold Warrior: James Jesus Angleton: The CIA's Master Spy Hunter, a 1992 book by Tom Mangold
- Richard H. Kirk or Cold Warrior, British musician

== See also ==
- Cold War (disambiguation)
