= Lexington class =

Lexington class could refer to two classes of ships of the U.S. Navy:

- Lexington-class battlecruiser - a class of six battlecruisers designed during World War I, they were being constructed when the Washington Naval Treaty forced the cancellation of the class. The two that were the most advanced in their construction became aircraft carriers, (see below) while the other four were scrapped.
- Lexington-class aircraft carrier - the conversion of two of the battlecruisers to aircraft carriers. These ships, Lexington and Saratoga, served in the U.S. Navy until Lexington was sunk during the Battle of the Coral Sea and Saratoga was used as a target ship for the Bikini atomic experiments (Operation Crossroads).
