= USS Proteus (AC-9) =

Collier of the United States Navy

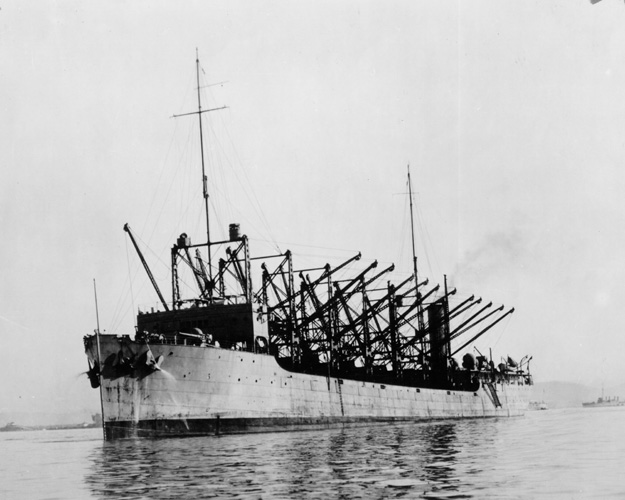
- USS Proteus

History

United States
- Name: USS Proteus
- Namesake: Proteus
- Builder: Newport News Shipbuilding and Dry Dock Company
- Laid down: 31 October 1911
- Launched: 14 September 1912
- Commissioned: 9 July 1913
- Decommissioned: 25 March 1924
- Stricken: 5 December 1940
- Fate: Sold, 8 March 1941; Lost at sea, November 1941

General characteristics
- Class & type: Proteus-class collier
- Displacement: 19,000 long tons (19,000 t) full
- Length: 522 ft (159 m)
- Beam: 63 ft (19 m)
- Draft: 27 ft 8 in (8.43 m)
- Speed: 15 kn (17 mph; 28 km/h)
- Complement: 158 officers and enlisted
- Armament: 4 × 4"/50 caliber guns

The collier USS Proteus (AC-9) was laid down on 31 October 1911, by the Newport News Shipbuilding and Dry Dock Company, and launched on 14 September 1912. She was the lead ship of her class of four colliers. She was commissioned on 9 July 1913, to the United States Navy.

== Service history ==
Following her fitting out and shakedown, Proteus steamed out of Norfolk, Virginia on 11 November 1913, on the first of four runs to Veracruz to coal battleships and cruisers of the Atlantic Fleet off Mexico. On 17 December 1914, Proteus left Hampton Roads carrying men, fuel, and stores to the Philippines. She completed the final of four such runs on 4 August of that year.

Sailing again from Norfolk on 25 September 1914, Proteus supplied coal, oil, men and stores for ships of the Atlantic Fleet at Rio de Janeiro and Montevideo. Assigned to the Naval Overseas Transport Service, she operated between Norfolk, Boston and New York City for the next several years.

Proteus set forth from New York on 14 July 1918, for the British Isles, returning to Hampton Roads on 19 September. She left again on Christmas Eve of 1918 for Brest, France, and spent the next six months shipping coal from Cardiff and Barry, Wales, to Brest.

Proteus returned to Norfolk on 6 August 1919, and during the greater part of the next three years cruised from Norfolk to replenish the Fleet in the Caribbean.

In the aftermath of World War I, Proteus cruised from Norfolk to replenish the U.S. Fleet in the Caribbean. Crossing the Panama Canal four times, she delivered fuel and stores to Pearl Harbor in 1920, and to Callao, Peru in 1921.

Her last supply run to the Caribbean ended at Hampton Roads on 12 April 1923. Proteus spent the remainder of her career in operations between Norfolk and Melville, Rhode Island.

She decommissioned at Norfolk on 25 March 1924 and remained inactive until her name was struck from the Naval Vessel Register on 5 December 1940. She was sold to Saguenay Terminals Ltd. of Montreal, Quebec on 8 March 1941 and thereafter operated in the Canadian Merchant Navy under the command of Master Walter Henry Millar.

== Loss at sea ==
Proteus was lost at sea to an unknown cause sometime after 23 November 1941. There are no German U-boat claims for this vessel. One suggestion, albeit with no supporting documentation, is that the vessel's disappearance can be attributed to the Bermuda Triangle, as she disappeared in roughly the accepted area for the Triangle's boundaries. However, the Triangle assertion does not allow for any specific cause, simply focusing on the fact that Proteus seems to have mysteriously disappeared.

A memorial listing of her crew can be found at the CWGC Halifax Memorial. A Canadian website suggests Proteus's possible fate as having foundered in heavy seas on 25 November 1941 somewhere in the Caribbean Sea with the loss of all of her 58 crewmembers.

Two of Proteus's three sister-ships, Cyclops and Nereus, also vanished without a trace while operating in or near the Caribbean during World War I and World War II, respectively. Her third sister-ship, Jupiter, was converted into the first U.S. aircraft carrier and renamed Langley. Langley was scuttled after being severely damaged by Japanese aircraft during World War II.
