= Cold Warrior: James Jesus Angleton: The CIA's Master Spy Hunter =

1992 book by Tom Mangold

- Author: Tom Mangold
- Subject: James Jesus Angleton
- Genre: Biography
- Publication date: 1992

Cold Warrior: James Jesus Angleton: The CIA's Master Spy Hunter is a 1992 book by Tom Mangold about James Jesus Angleton, who served as the head of the Central Intelligence Agency's Counterintelligence Staff from 1954 until 1974.

The book is based on interviews, many of them attributed, instead of documentary evidence.

Cold Warrior was the basis for a May 1991 episode of Frontline titled The Spy Hunter.

== Reception ==
Writing in The Washington Post, Charles R. Babcock praised Mangold's research, calling his book "a major revision in the history of American espionage," although he averred that the depiction of Angleton was "one-dimensional." In The New York Times, Joseph Finder hailed Cold Warrior as "fascinating and superbly researched," but stated that the work was unduly slanted against Angleton.

Raymond L. Garthoff of the Brookings Institution stated that in regard to Angleton the book is the "best and most complete and accurate account so far as one can tell." Intelligence scholar Gregory F. Treverton called Cold Warrior a "commanding indictment" of Angleton. CIA Chief Historian David Robarge stated that the book is "the most factually detailed, thoroughly researched study of Angleton" but also criticized what he described as "sinister overtones and shallow psychologizing." Counterintelligence specialist Cleveland Cram highlighted Mangold's research and called Cold Warrior "an honest and accurate book," although he lamented that much material had been cut from earlier drafts of the work.

== Sources ==
- Babcock, Charles R. (July 7, 1991). "Obsessions of a Spymaster". The Washington Post.
- Cram, Cleveland C. (October 1993). Of Moles and Molehunters: A Review of Counterintelligence Literature, 1977-92 (PDF). Washington, D.C.: Center for the Study of Intelligence. Archived from the original (PDF) on December 24, 2011.
- Finder, Joseph (June 30, 1991). "The Life and Strange Career of a Mole Hunter". The New York Times.
- Garthoff, Raymond L. (Spring 1993). "Cold Warrior: James Jesus Angleton: The CIA's Master Spy Hunter". Political Science Quarterly. 108 (1): 161–163. doi:10.2307/2152493. JSTOR 2152493.
- Robarge, David (Winter 2003). "Moles, Defectors, and Deceptions: James Angleton and CIA Counterintelligence" (PDF). Journal of Intelligence History. 3 (2): 21–49. doi:10.1080/16161262.2003.10555085. S2CID 159176794. Archived from the original (PDF) on 2020-10-21.
- Robarge, David (December 2009). "'Cunning Passages, Contrived Corridors': Wandering in the Angletonian Wilderness" (PDF). Studies in Intelligence. 53 (4): 1–13. Archived from the original (PDF) on 2017-02-28.
- Sniffen, Michael J. (May 12, 1991). "CIA Mistakenly Returned Cooperating Soviet Spy To The KGB, Book Says". Associated Press.
- Treverton, Gregory F. (Winter 1991). "Cold Warrior". Foreign Affairs. 70 (5): 183. JSTOR 20045018.
