= Lexington-class aircraft carrier =

1925 class of American aircraft carriers

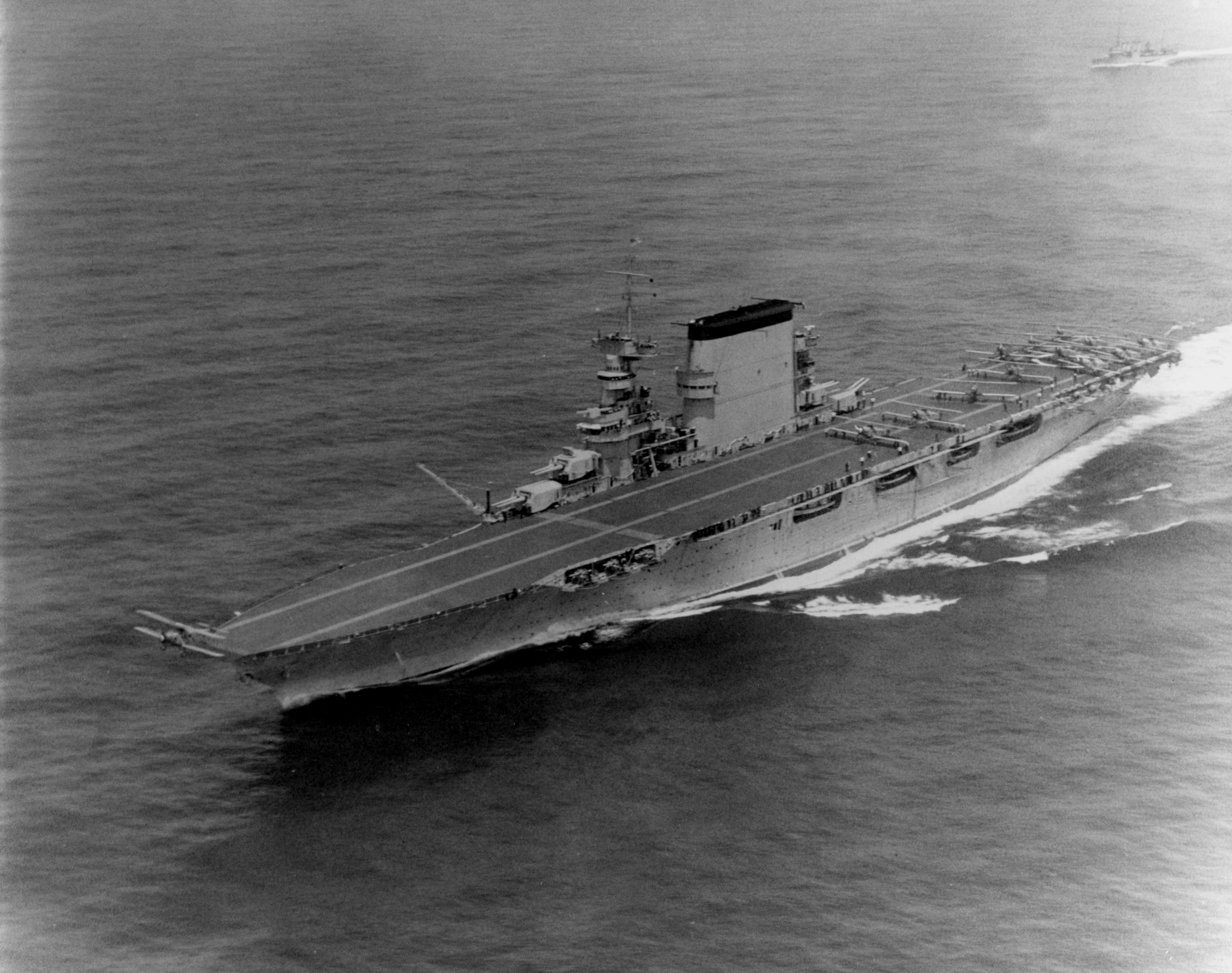
- USS Lexington before World War II

Class overview
- Name: Lexington class
- Builders: Fore River Shipyard; New York Shipbuilding Corporation
- Operators: United States Navy
- Preceded by: USS Langley (CV-1)
- Succeeded by: USS Ranger (CV-4)
- Cost: about $45,000,000
- Built: 1920–1927
- In service: 1927–1946
- In commission: 1927–1946
- Planned: 2
- Completed: 2
- Lost: 1
- Retired: 1

General characteristics (as built)
- Type: Aircraft carrier
- Displacement: 36,000 long tons (37,000 t) (standard)
- Length: 888 ft (270.7 m) (oa)
- Beam: 106 ft (32.3 m)
- Draft: 30 ft 5 in (9.3 m) (deep load)
- Installed power: 16 water-tube boilers; 180,000 shp (130,000 kW)
- Propulsion: 4 shafts; 4 sets turbo-electric transmission
- Speed: 34.5 knots (63.9 km/h; 39.7 mph) (actual)
- Range: 10,000 nmi (19,000 km; 12,000 mi) at 10 knots (19 km/h; 12 mph)
- Complement: 2,791 (including aviation personnel), 1942
- Armament: 4 × twin 8 in (203 mm) guns; 12 × single 5 in (127 mm) AA guns
- Armor: Belt: 5–7 in (127–178 mm); Deck: 0.75–2 in (19–51 mm); Gun turrets: 0.75 in (19 mm); Bulkheads: 5–7 in (127–178 mm)
- Aircraft carried: 90
- Aviation facilities: 1 × Aircraft catapult; 2 × Elevators

The Lexington-class aircraft carriers were a pair of aircraft carriers built for the United States Navy (USN) during the 1920s, the USS Lexington (CV-2) and USS Saratoga (CV-3). The ships were built on hulls originally laid down as battlecruisers after World War I, but under the Washington Naval Treaty of 1922, all U.S. battleship and battlecruiser construction was cancelled. The Treaty, however, allowed two of the unfinished ships to be converted to carriers. They were the first operational aircraft carriers in the USN (Note: USS Langley was a strictly experimental ship.) and were used to develop carrier aviation tactics and procedures before World War II in a series of annual exercises.

They proved extremely successful as carriers and experience with the Lexington class convinced the Navy of the value of large carriers. They were the largest aircraft carriers in the USN until the Midway-class aircraft carriers were completed beginning in 1945. The ships served in World War II, seeing action in many battles. Although Lexington was sunk in the first carrier battle in history (the Battle of the Coral Sea) in 1942, Saratoga served throughout the war, despite being torpedoed twice, notably participating in the Battle of the Eastern Solomons in mid-1942 where her aircraft sank the Japanese light carrier Ryūjō. She supported Allied operations in the Indian Ocean and South West Pacific Areas until she became a training ship at the end of 1944. Saratoga returned to combat to protect American forces during the Battle of Iwo Jima in early 1945, but was badly damaged by kamikazes. The continued growth in the size and weight of carrier aircraft made her obsolete by the end of the war. In mid-1946, the ship was purposefully sunk during nuclear weapon tests in Operation Crossroads.

== Development ==
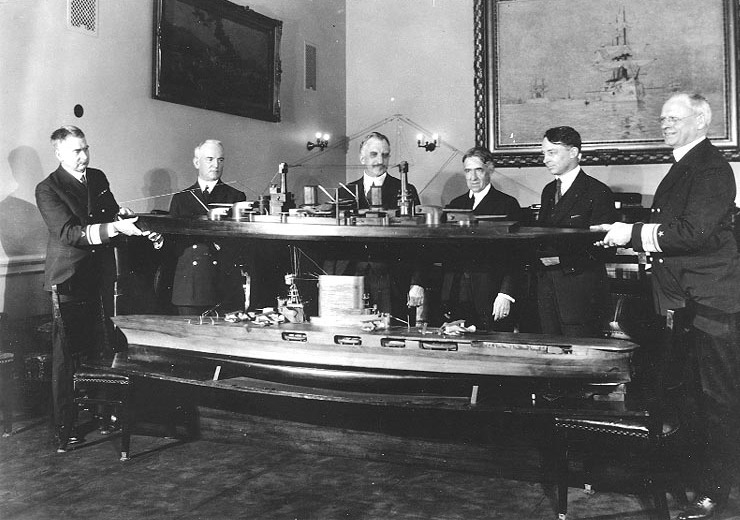
Rear Admiral David W. Taylor (left), Chief of the Bureau of Construction and Repair, and Rear Admiral John K. Robison (right), Chief of the Bureau of Engineering, hold a model of the battlecruiser above a model of the proposed conversion to an aircraft carrier at the Navy Department on 8 March 1922.

The Lexington-class ships were originally designed to be battlecruisers, with heavy guns, high speed, and moderate armor protection. The Navy laid down six ships of the class in 1919–20. The terms of the Washington Naval Treaty of 1922 called for the scrapping of all capital ships then under construction, except that each signatory was allowed to designate two of the unfinished ships for completion as carriers. Globally, candidates for conversion included ships of the United States' Lexington class, Japan's Amagi class, and Great Britain's G3 battlecruisers. Lexington and Saratoga were selected by the United States because they were the farthest along of the six ships under construction.

One major challenge the Navy's Bureau of Construction and Repair faced was the tonnage cap set by the treaty. Generally, under the treaty carriers were to displace no more than 27,000 tons. An exception, proposed by Assistant Secretary of the Navy Theodore Roosevelt Jr. and added to the treaty, allowed each signatory to convert two capital ships under construction into carriers displacing up to 33,000 tons. But this was still not enough to cover the two Lexington conversions, which were expected to displace nearly 36,000 tons each. One solution would have been to fall back on a power plant that produced only half the desired power, which would have cost them c. 7 knots in speed, something the department found absolutely unacceptable. The alternative was to get creative: there was a clause in the treaty that offered a potential, if questionable, way out of this situation. The clause (Chapter II, Part III, Section I, (d)) read:

No retained capital ships or aircraft carriers shall be reconstructed except for the purpose of providing means of defense against air and submarine attack, and subject to the following rules: The Contracting Powers may, for that purpose, equip existing tonnage with bulge or blister or anti-air attack deck protection, providing the increase of displacement thus effected does not exceed 3,000 tons (3,048 metric tons) displacement for each ship.

The intention was apparently that this was extra weight be applied some time in the future, during a mid-life reconstruction of the ship; but the American interpretation--that the extra weight could be applied to a modification during the original build-- was ultimately not challenged.

Conversion became a series of compromises and mixed blessings which would not have arisen had they been "specifically designed carriers" from the outset. On the plus side, the ships would have better anti-torpedo protection, larger magazines for aircraft bombs and, with the aft elevator 28 feet (8.5 m) farther forward than on the parallel design for a purpose-built carrier, more room for aircraft landings. On the minus side, a converted battlecruiser would be 0.5 knots (0.93 km/h; 0.58 mph) slower than a specifically designed carrier, have 16 percent less hangar space, less emergency fuel and, with "narrower lines" aft, not as wide a runway for an approaching airplane to aim at. Costs were similar: estimated cost for a brand-new carrier was estimated at $27.1 million, while conversion of a Lexington class hull would cost $22.4 million, plus the $6.7 million already sunk into them. Added together, the figure rose to $29.1 million. (Note: Both of these figures (the $6.7 and $22.4) are estimates for one of the lesser-advanced ships like Ranger. The former cost would be higher and the second lower for one of the more-advanced ships.)

== Design and description ==
=== General description ===
The ships had an overall length of 888 feet (270.7 m), a beam of 106 feet (32.3 m), and a draft of 30 feet 5 inches (9.3 m) at deep load. Saratoga had a standard displacement of 36,000 long tons (36,578 t), and 43,055 long tons (43,746 t) at deep load.

One of their innovative features was a relatively new kind of bow called the bulbous bow or Taylor bow, named after its inventor, Rear Admiral David W. Taylor, who served as Chief Constructor for the U.S. Navy's Bureau of Construction and Repair in World War I. The result of a series of towing tests begun in 1910, this bow reduced water resistance by an average of six percent at high speeds, supported the forecastle and reduced bending stress on the hull. A disadvantage was the formation of a thick layer of water, part of the bow wave, which would creep up along the forward side of the hull at higher speeds, although this could be reduced to some degree by careful design of this area.

=== Flight deck arrangements ===
These ships were given an 866-by-106-foot (264.0 by 32.3 m) teak flight deck.The hangar was 424 feet (129.2 m) long; its width, constrained by the bulky funnel uptakes and boat recessess, varied from 68 to 74 feet (20.7 to 22.6 m), and it had a clear height of 20 feet (6.1 m). Unlike most American carriers, it had no supplemental stowage space above the clear height, as the uppermost reaches of the hangar space were entirely taken up by a gallery deck, within which the crew was housed. The hangar floor had a surface area of 33,528 square feet (3,114.9 m^{2}), making it the largest enclosed space afloat, civilian or military, when built. Aircraft repair shops, 108 feet (32.9 m) long, were located aft of the hangar, and stowage space for disassembled aircraft was located in a 128-foot (39-m) long compartment beneath the hangar floor. The hangar was divided by a single fire curtain just forward of the aft aircraft elevator.

The carriers were fitted with two hydraulically powered elevators on their centerline. The forward elevator measured 30 feet (front to back) by 60 feet (side to side; 9.1 by 18.3 m) and had a capacity of 16,000 lb (7.3 t), moving at a speed of 2 feet (0.61 m) per second when lifting a 12,000-lb (5.45-tonne) load. A 20 by 26 foot (6.1 by 7.9 m) section of the flight deck adjoining the rear edge of the elevator could split down the centerline to allow the tail of a long aircraft to pass through. The aft elevator measured 30 by 36 feet (9.1 by 11.0 m) and could lift only 6,000 lb (2.7 tonnes). Munitions were delivered from the magazines by two hydraulically powered bomb lifts and one torpedo lift. A folding crane with a capacity of 10 long tons (10 tonnes) was positioned on the flight deck forward of the gun turrets. Aviation gasoline was stored in eight compartments of the torpedo protection system and their capacity has been quoted as either 132,264 US gallons (500,670 L; 110,133 imp gal) or 163,000 US gallons (620,000 L; 136,000 imp gal). A flywheel-powered aircraft catapult, 155 feet (47.2 m) long, was fitted at the bow; it could launch a 10,000-pound (4,540 kg) aircraft at a speed of 48 knots (89 km/h; 55 mph). It was removed in 1934 as it proved to be unnecessary.

The Lexington-class ships were designed to carry 78 aircraft of various types, including 36 bombers, but these numbers increased once the Navy adopted the practice of tying up spare aircraft in the unused spaces at the top of the hangar. In 1936, her air group consisted of 18 Grumman F2F-1 and 18 Boeing F4B-4 fighters, plus an additional nine F2Fs in reserve. Offensive punch was provided by 20 Vought SBU Corsair dive bombers with 10 spare aircraft and 18 Great Lakes BG heavy dive bomber aircraft with nine spares. Miscellaneous aircraft included two Grumman JF Duck amphibians, plus one in reserve, and three active and one spare Vought O2U Corsair observation aircraft. This amounted to 79 aircraft, plus 30 spares.

In early December 1941, Lexington was ferrying 18 U.S. Marine Corps (USMC) Vought SB2U Vindicator dive bombers to Midway Atoll and at that time she embarked 65 of her own aircraft, including 17 Brewster F2A Buffalo fighters. During the Wake Island relief expedition later that month, Saratoga's air group consisted of 13 Grumman F4F Wildcat fighters, 42 Douglas SBD Dauntless dive bombers, and 11 Douglas TBD Devastator torpedo bombers. The ship also carried 14 Marine Corps Buffalos for delivery at Wake. Before the Battle of the Eastern Solomons in mid-1942, Saratoga's air group consisted of 90 aircraft, comprising 37 Wildcats, 37 Dauntlesses and 16 Grumman TBF Avenger torpedo bombers. In early 1945, the ship carried 53 Grumman F6F Hellcat fighters and 17 Avengers.

=== Propulsion ===
Turbo-electric propulsion had been chosen for the battlecruisers because American companies struggled to produce the very large geared turbines necessary for such big ships and was retained when they were converted into aircraft carriers. One advantage of turbo-electric drive was that the substitution of flexible electric cables for bulky steam-lines allowed the motors to be mounted farther aft; this reduced vibration and weight by shortening the propeller shafts. Another was the ability to go astern at full power without needing a separate reverse turbine to do so, simply by reversing the electrical polarity of the motors. Other benefits were the ability to operate all four propellers if one of the turbo generators failed, and the possibility of operating only some of the generators at low speed with suitably higher loading and greater efficiency. "[Turbo-electric drive] was efficient, rugged and always reliable. But it was also heavy, intricate, and not easy to maintain and keep tuned up." The machinery also required special ventilation measures to dissipate heat and to keep out any salt air. Even with this and elaborate insulation measures, protection from moisture or from flooding due to battle damage or other causes remained problematic and it posed the danger of high voltage to the crew if damaged.

Each propeller was 14 feet 9 inches (4.50 m) in diameter and each of the four propeller shafts was powered by two 22,500-shaft-horsepower (16,800 kW) electric motors acting in tandem. These motors were about five times the size of any earlier electric motor. Four General Electric turbo generators powered each propeller shaft and each was rated at 35,200 kilowatts (47,200 hp), 5000 volts and 4620 amps of direct current (DC). Each of the four alternating current (AC) alternators produced 40,000 kVA. Sixteen water-tube boilers, each in their own individual compartment, provided steam for the generators at a working pressure of 295 psi (2,034 kPa; 21 kgf/cm^{2}) and a temperature of 460 °F (238 °C). The turbo-electric machinery of the Lexington-class ships was designed to produce a total of 180,000 shaft horsepower (130,000 kW) and propel the ships at 33.25 knots (61.58 km/h; 38.26 mph), but each ship reached over 202,000 shp (151,000 kW) and 34.5 knots (63.9 km/h; 39.7 mph) in sea trials in 1928. Six 750-kilowatt (1,010 hp) DC turbo generators were installed in the upper levels of the two main turbine compartments.

The ships carried a maximum of 6,688 long tons (6,795 t) of fuel oil, but only 5,400 long tons (5,500 t) of that was usable as the rest had to be retained as ballast in the port fuel tanks to offset the weight of the island and main guns. They demonstrated a range of 9,910 nautical miles (18,350 km; 11,400 mi) at a speed of 10.7 knots (19.8 km/h; 12.3 mph) with 4,540 long tons (4,610 t) of oil.

=== Armament ===
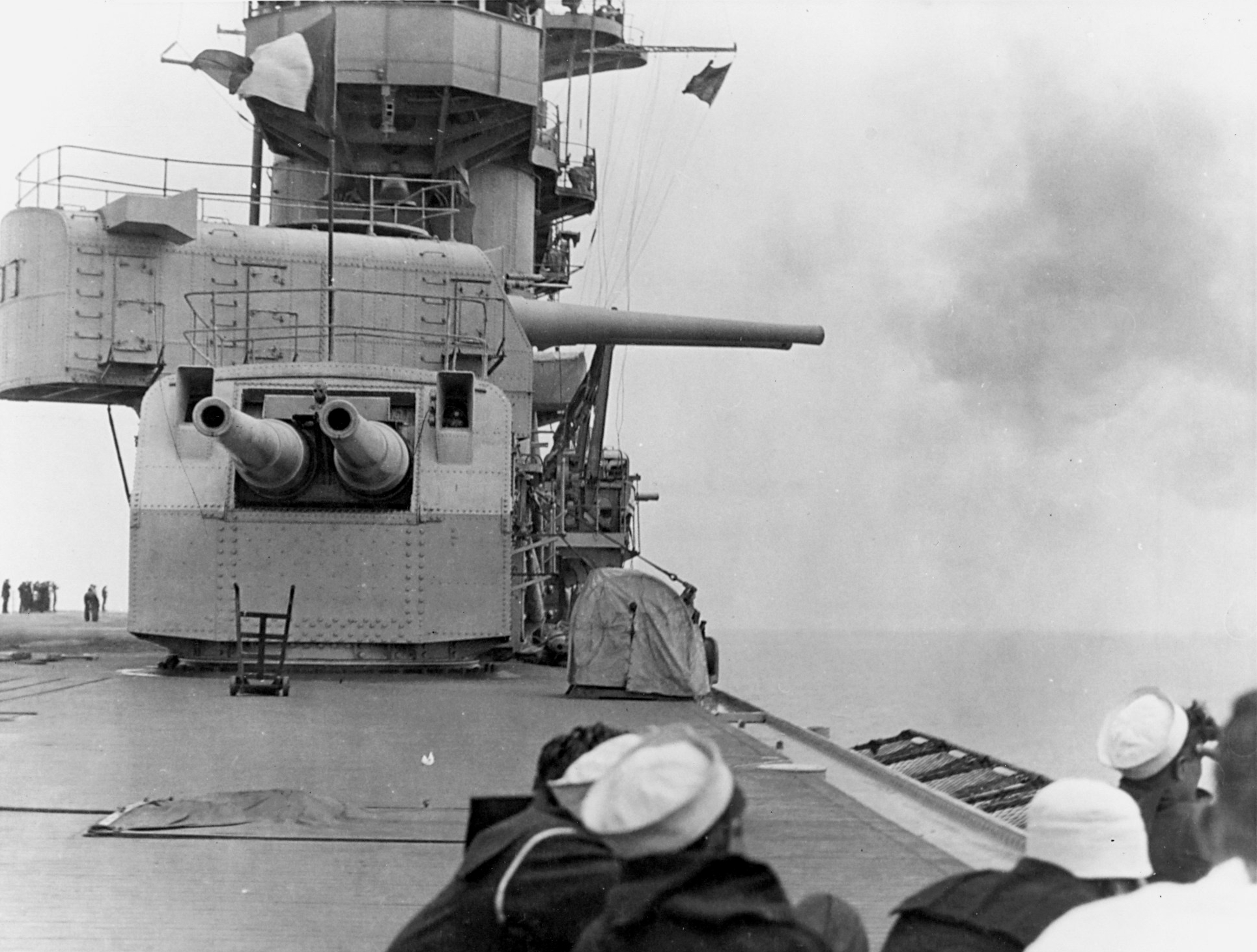
Lexington firing her 8-inch guns, 1928

The Bureau of Construction and Repair was not then convinced that aircraft could be an effective and sufficient armament for a warship. Thus the design as carriers included a substantial gun battery of eight 8-inch/55-caliber guns (Note: In USN gun nomenclature, the "/55 caliber" denotes the length of the gun, meaning that the gun barrel is 55 times as long as it is in internal diameter.) in four twin gun turrets, two pairs of superfiring turrets fore and aft of the island. These turrets were mounted above the flight deck on the starboard side, two before the bridge, and two behind the funnel. The guns in theory could fire to both sides, but it is probable that if they were fired to port (across the deck) the blast would have damaged the flight deck. The guns could be depressed to −5° and elevated to +41°; they were loaded at an angle of +9°. They fired 260-pound (118 kg) projectiles at a muzzle velocity of 2,800 ft/s (850 m/s); this gave a maximum range of 31,860 yards (29,133 m).

The Lexington class' anti-aircraft (AA) armament consisted of a dozen 5-inch/25 caliber guns, six on each side of the ship on single mounts. They had a maximum elevation of +85°. They fired 53.85-pound (24.43 kg) projectiles at a muzzle velocity of 2,110 ft/s (640 m/s). Their maximum range against surface targets was 17,700 yards (16,200 m) at +30° elevation.

As built, the ships were not fitted with any light AA guns, but a few .50-inch (13 mm) water-cooled M2 Browning anti-aircraft machine guns were fitted shortly after commissioning and the numbers gradually increased over the 1930s. Lexington had 24 of these guns aboard when she was sunk in early 1942. Their 1.6-ounce (45 g) projectiles had a muzzle velocity of 2,930 ft/s (890 m/s), but an effective range of only 1,600 yards (1,500 m). They had a rate of fire of 550–700 rounds per minute and were exceedingly reliable, however, their projectiles were too light and too short ranged so they were replaced by license-built Oerlikon 20 mm autocannon beginning in 1942. The Oerlikon fired 20 mm (0.79 in), .272-pound (0.123 kg) high-explosive shells at a muzzle velocity of 2,750 ft/s (840 m/s). Its maximum range was 4,800 yards (4,400 m) although the effective range was under 1,000 yards (910 m). The cyclic rate of fire was 450 rounds per minute, but the practical rate was between 250 and 320 rounds per minute owing to the need to reload magazines. Saratoga mounted 52 of these guns in late 1942.

The Navy had been developing a quadruple 1.1-inch light AA gun since the early 1930s, but it was delayed with teething problems, so five single 3-inch/50 caliber Mk 10 AA guns were installed in 1940 as temporary replacements. They fired 13-pound (5.9 kg) shells at a muzzle velocity of 2,700 ft/s (820 m/s). At +85° elevation they had an anti-aircraft ceiling of 29,800 feet (9,100 m).

The Navy made plans to remove the eight-inch (203 mm) gun turrets in 1940 and replace them with four twin 5"/38 caliber dual-purpose gun turrets (the standard mounting on U.S. battleships and cruisers). At the same time, the five-inch (127 mm) 25-caliber guns were to be replaced with more 5"/38 guns on a two for three basis to compensate for their greater weight. The guns fired 55-pound (25 kg) projectiles at a muzzle velocity of 2,600 ft/s (790 m/s) at a rate of fire up to 20 rounds per minute. Against surface targets they had a range of 18,200 yards (16,600 m).

Five quadruple 1.1-inch gun mounts were finally fitted aboard the Lexington-class ships in late 1941 and early 1942. The .9-pound (0.41 kg) projectiles had a muzzle velocity of 2,700 ft/s (820 m/s) and an effective range of 3,000 yards (2,700 m). The maximum rate of fire was 150 rounds per minute although the frequent need to reload the eight-round magazines reduced that. The gun was not successful in service and it was replaced by the license-built Bofors 40 mm gun beginning in late 1942. The 40-millimeter (1.6 in), 1.98-pound (0.90 kg) high-explosive shell was fired at a muzzle velocity of 2,890 ft/s (880 m/s). Its maximum range was 11,000 yards (10,000 m) although the effective range was around 4,000–5,000 yards (3,700–4,600 m). The cyclic rate of fire was 160 rounds per minute. The guns were fitted in quadruple and twin gun mounts in increasing numbers over the war. Saratoga had 23 quadruple and two twin mounts in early 1944.

Lexington's eight-inch gun turrets were removed in early 1942, but they were replaced by seven additional quadruple 1.1-inch gun mounts as a temporary measure. The ship was sunk before her five-inch guns could be replaced and the turrets installed. Saratoga's armament was upgraded in early 1942 while she was under repair after she had been torpedoed. The eight-inch guns and turrets of both ships were reused as coast defense weapons on Oahu.

=== Fire control and electronics ===
The two superfiring eight-inch turrets had a Mk 30 rangefinder at the rear of the turret for local control, but the guns were normally controlled by two Mk 18 fire-control directors, one each on the fore and aft spotting tops. A 20-foot (6.1 m) rangefinder was fitted on top of the pilothouse to provide range information for the directors. Each group of three 5-inch guns was controlled by a Mk 19 director, two of which were mounted on each side of the spotting tops. Plans were made before the war to replace the obsolete Mk 19 directors with two heavier Mk 33 directors, one each on the fore and aft five-inch spotting tops, but these plans were cancelled when the dual-purpose guns replaced the main armament in early 1942.

Saratoga received a CXAM-1 early warning radar from RCA in February 1941 during a refit in Bremerton. The antenna was mounted on the forward lip of the funnel with its control room directly below the aerial, replacing the secondary conning station formerly mounted there. She also received two FC (Mk 3) surface fire-control radars in late 1941, although these were both removed along with her main armament in January 1942. The new dual-purpose guns were controlled by two Mk 37 directors, each mounting an FD (Mk 4) anti-aircraft gunnery radar. When the 1.1-inch guns were replaced by 40 mm guns in 1942, the directors for the smaller guns were replaced by five Mk 51 directors. Additional radars were added during 1942 and the ship's electronics were modernized during her refit in January 1944.

=== Armor ===
The waterline belt of the Lexington-class ships tapered 7–5 inches (178–127 mm) in thickness from top to bottom and angled 11° outwards at the top. This angle increased the armor's relative thickness to horizontal, close-range fire, albeit at the cost of reducing its relative height which increased the chance of plunging shellfire going over or under it. It covered the middle 530 feet (161.5 m) of the ships. Forward, the belt ended in a bulkhead that also tapered from seven to five inches in thickness. Aft, it terminated at a seven-inch bulkhead. This belt had a height of 9 feet 4 inches (2.8 m). The third deck over the ships' machinery and magazine was armored with two layers of special treatment steel (STS) totaling 2 inches (51 mm) in thickness. The steering gear, however, was protected by two layers of STS that totaled 3 inches (76 mm) on the flat and 4.5 inches (114 mm) on the slope.

The gun turrets were protected only against splinters with .75 inches (19 mm) of armor. The conning tower was 2–2.25 inches (51–57 mm) of STS, and it had a communications tube with two-inch sides ran from the conning tower down to the lower conning position on the third deck. The torpedo defense system of the Lexington-class ships consisted of three to six medium steel protective bulkheads that ranged from .375 to .75 inches (10 to 19 mm) in thickness. The spaces between them could be left empty or used as fuel tanks to absorb the detonation of a torpedo's warhead.

== Ships ==
Construction data
| Ship name | Hull no. | Builder | Laid down | Launched | Commissioned | Fate |
|---|---|---|---|---|---|---|
| Lexington | CV-2 | Fore River Ship and Engine Building Co., Quincy | 8 January 1921 | 3 October 1925 | 14 December 1927 | Sunk in the Battle of Coral Sea, 8 May 1942 |
| Saratoga | CV-3 | New York Shipbuilding Corporation, Camden | 25 September 1920 | 7 April 1925 | 16 November 1927 | Sunk as a target ship, 25 July 1946 |

== Service ==
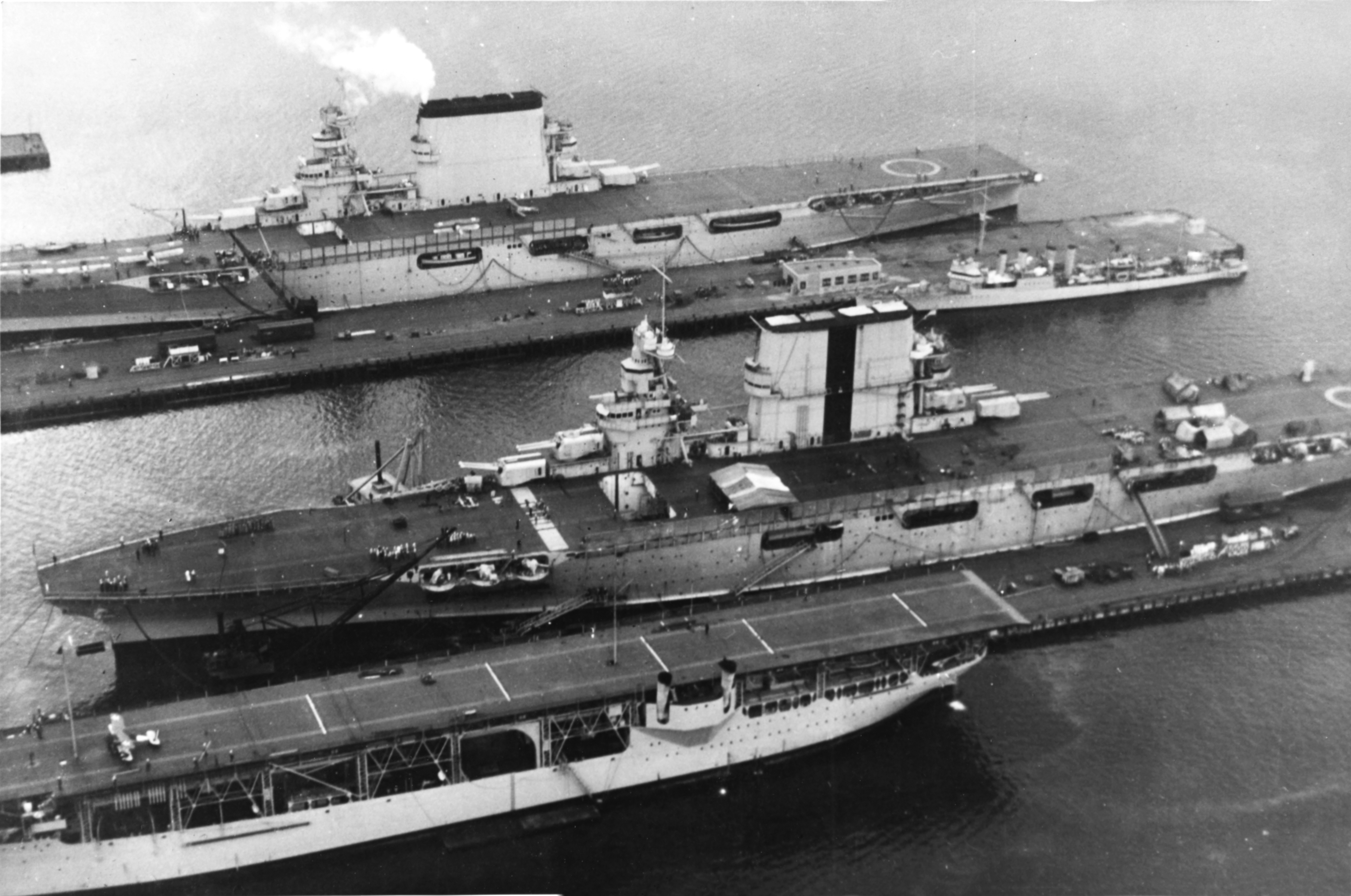
Lexington (top) and Saratoga alongside the smaller Langley at Puget Sound Navy Yard in 1929. To aid recognition, Saratoga had a black stripe painted on her funnel.

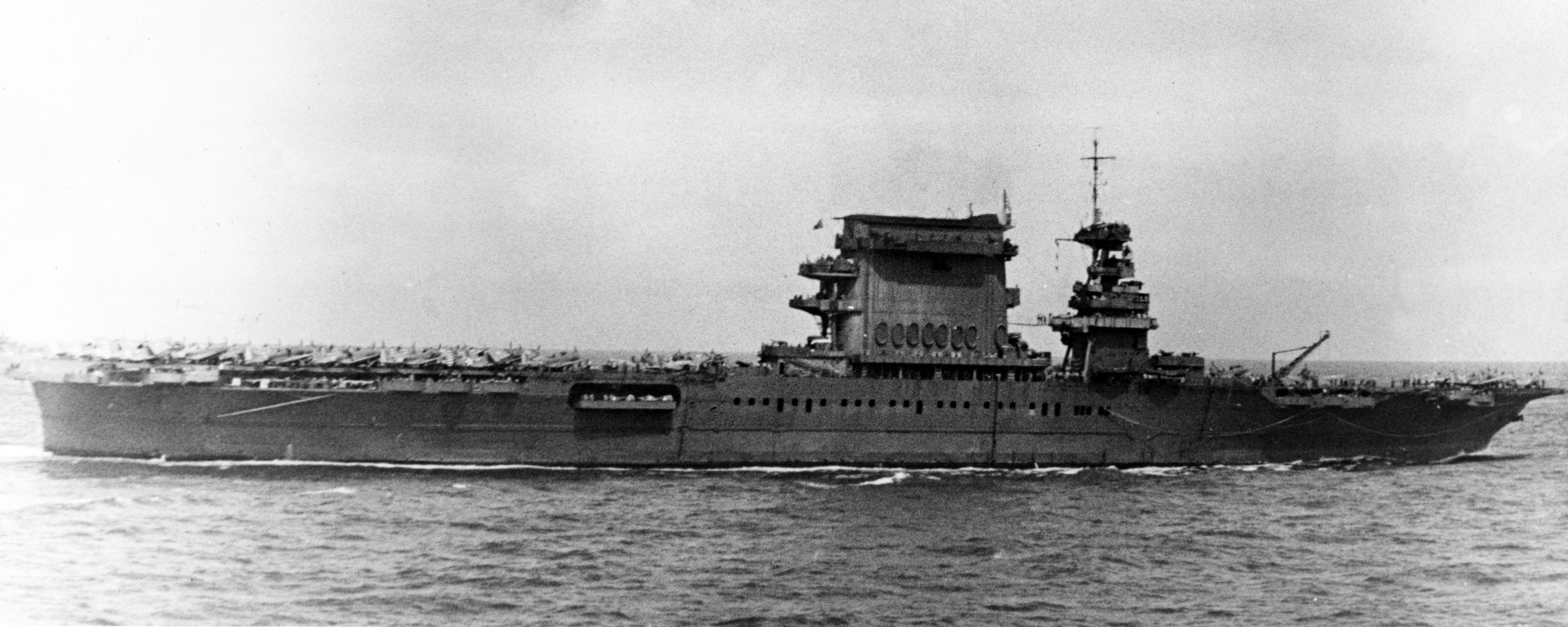
Lexington during the Battle of the Coral Sea

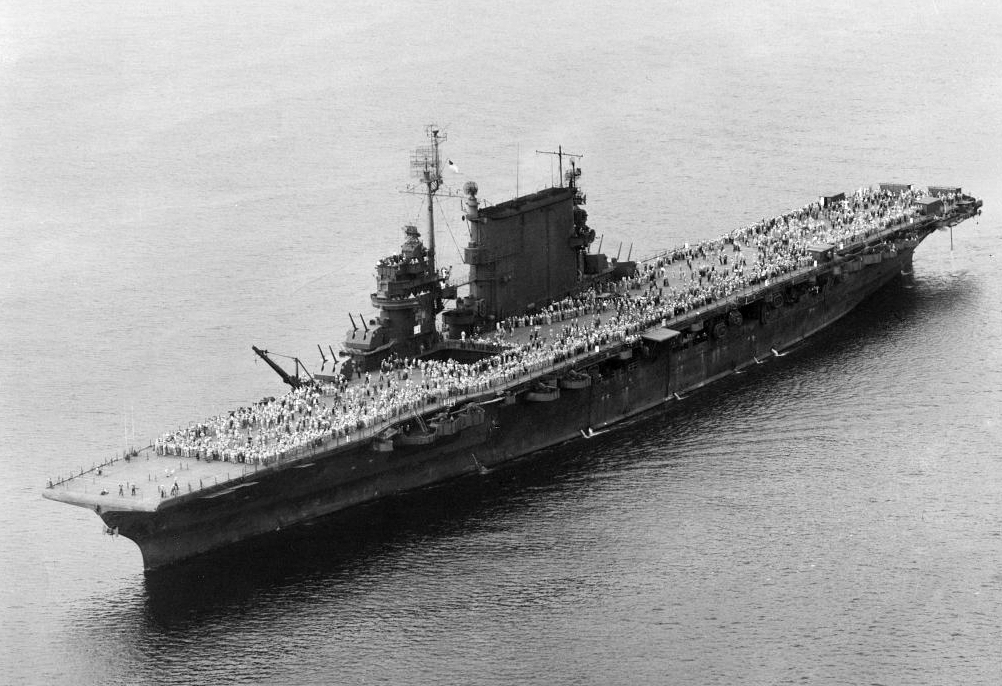
Saratoga during Operation Magic Carpet in 1945

Lexington and Saratoga were used to develop and refine carrier tactics in a series of annual exercises before World War II. On more than one occasion these included successfully staged surprise attacks on Pearl Harbor, Hawaii. Lexington's turbo-electric propulsion system allowed her to supplement the electrical supply of Tacoma, Washington, in a drought from late 1929 to early 1930. She also delivered medical personnel and relief supplies to Managua, Nicaragua, after an earthquake in 1931.

Both ships were assigned to the Pacific Fleet and were based at Pearl Harbor in December 1941, although, at the time of the Japanese attack, neither of them were in port. Lexington was at sea ferrying fighter aircraft to Midway Island. Her mission was cancelled and she returned to Pearl Harbor a week later. Saratoga had completed a major refit at Bremerton, and, following work up, had arrived in San Diego to embark her air group. Saratoga immediately sailed for Hawaii as the flagship of Carrier Division One, arriving on 15 December.

A few days after Lexington returned to Pearl Harbor from her aborted mission to Midway, she was sent to create a diversion from the force en route to relieve the besieged Wake Island garrison by attacking Japanese installations in the Marshall Islands. The island was forced to surrender before the relief force got close enough, and the mission was cancelled. A planned attack on Wake Island in January 1942 had to be cancelled when a submarine sank the oiler required to supply the fuel for the return trip. Lexington was sent to the Coral Sea the following month to block any Japanese advances into the area. The ship was spotted by Japanese search aircraft while approaching Rabaul, New Britain, and her aircraft shot down most of the Japanese bombers that attacked her. Together with the carrier Yorktown, she successfully attacked Japanese shipping off the east coast of New Guinea in early March.

Lexington was briefly refitted in Pearl Harbor at the end of the month and rendezvoused with Yorktown in the Coral Sea in early May. A few days later the Japanese began Operation MO, the invasion of Port Moresby, Papua New Guinea, and the two American carriers attempted to stop the invasion forces. They sank the light aircraft carrier Shōhō on 7 May in the Battle of the Coral Sea, but did not encounter the main Japanese force of the carriers Shōkaku and Zuikaku until the next day. Aircraft from Lexington and Yorktown succeeded in badly damaging Shōkaku, but the Japanese aircraft crippled Lexington. Vapors from leaking aviation gasoline tanks sparked a series of explosions and fires that could not be controlled, and the carrier had to be scuttled by an American destroyer on the evening of 8 May to prevent her capture.

Shortly after the Japanese attack on Pearl Harbor, Saratoga was the centerpiece of the unsuccessful American effort to relieve Wake Island and was torpedoed by a Japanese submarine a few weeks later. After lengthy repairs, the ship supported forces participating in the Guadalcanal campaign and her aircraft sank the light carrier Ryūjō in the Battle of the Eastern Solomons in August 1942. She was again torpedoed the following month and returned to the Solomon Islands area after repairs were completed.

In 1943, Saratoga supported Allied forces involved in the New Georgia Campaign and invasion of Bougainville in the northern Solomon Islands and her aircraft twice attacked the Japanese base at Rabaul in November. Early in 1944, her aircraft provided air support in the Gilbert and Marshall Islands Campaign before she was transferred to the Indian Ocean for several months to support the Royal Navy's Eastern Fleet as it attacked targets in Java and Sumatra. After a brief refit in mid-1944, the ship became a training ship for the rest of the year.

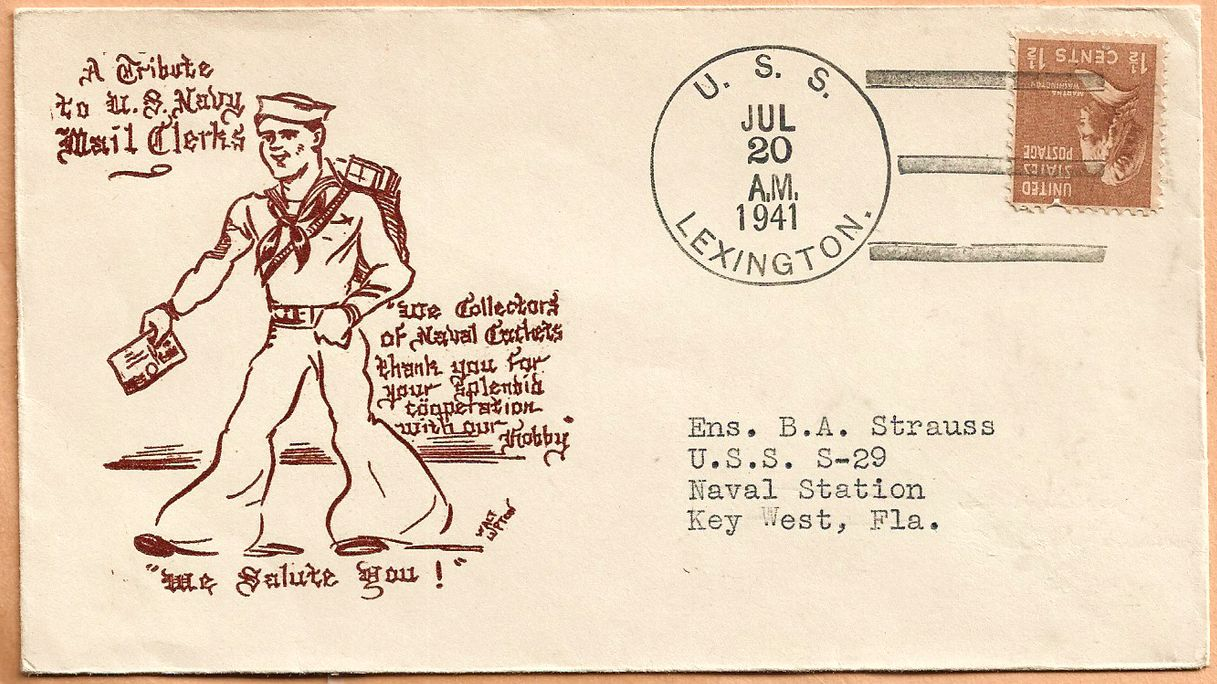
USS Lexington, official postmark

In early 1945, Saratoga participated in the Battle of Iwo Jima as a dedicated night fighter carrier. Several days into the battle, she was badly damaged by kamikaze hits and was forced to return to the United States for repairs. While under repair, the ship, now increasingly obsolete, was permanently modified as a training carrier with some of her hangar deck converted into classrooms. Saratoga remained in this role for the rest of the war and was used to ferry troops back to the United States after the Japanese surrender in August. In July 1946, she was used as a target for atomic bomb tests in Operation Crossroads, and sank at Bikini Atoll. Her wreck is easily accessible to scuba divers and organized dive tours are available.
