= Tom Mangold =

British writer and broadcaster

- Born: 20 August 1934 (age 91); Hamburg, Germany
- Occupations: Journalist, author
- Website: tommangold.com

Thomas Cornelius Mangold (born 20 August 1934) is a British broadcaster, journalist and author. For 26 years he was an investigative journalist with the BBC Panorama current affairs television programme.

== Personal life ==
Tom Mangold was born in Hamburg and came to Britain in 1939. He attended Dorking County Grammar School. He did National Service with the Royal Artillery. He is married, lives in London, has three daughters by previous marriages, and works as a freelance reporter specialising in intelligence and travel.

== Journalism ==
Mangold was a reporter with the Sunday Mirror and then the Daily Express. After spending nearly two years investigating the Profumo affair, he joined BBC TV News in 1964 to be a war correspondent covering conflicts in Aden, Vietnam, Nigeria, Northern Ireland, the Middle East and Afghanistan. In 1971 he moved to BBC TV Current Affairs working first for 24 Hours, then Midweek, becoming involved in some of the first investigative news documentaries of the BBC.

In 1976 Mangold transferred to Panorama, still concentrating on investigative journalism and making over 100 documentaries in 26 years. In 1993 he won both the Business / Consumer Investigative Reports category in the CableACE Award in and also the Royal Television Society's Journalism Award. These were followed in 1996 by the bronze award in the Best Investigative Report Category at the New York Television Festival and in 1999 he won Investigative Reporting / News Documentary category in the Chicago International Television Competition.

Between 2004 and 2008 Mangold helped Mayfield, Kentucky resident Susan Galbreath investigate the 2000 case of the murder of Jessica Currin, which led to the conviction of Quincy Cross in 2008. Galbreath had contacted Mangold after seeing some of his Panorama programmes on local cable TV.. There is reason to believe that the conviction may be unsafe after many of the original witnesses recanted their testimony

Mangold has been described in The Times as "the doyen of broadcasting reporters."

== Works ==
=== Books ===
Mangold has written or co-written five books:

- The File on the Tsar, with Anthony Summers. Harper & Row (1976). ISBN 978-0060128074.
- The Tunnels of Cu Chi, with John Penycate . New York: Berkeley Books (1985). ISBN 978-0340278109.
- Cold Warrior: James Jesus Angleton: The CIA's Master Spy Hunter (1991). ISBN 978-0671662738.
- Plague Wars, with Jeff Goldberg. St. Martin's Press (1999). ISBN 978-0333716144.
- SPLASHED! A Life from Print to Panorama. London: Biteback (2016). ISBN 978-1785901706.

=== Filmography ===
In 1996, Mangold did research for the BBC/HBO drama-documentary Hostile Waters, about the loss of a Russian submarine.

- "The Man Who Armed the World." Four Corners, Season 49, Episode 4 (Mar. 2, 2009).

On Russian arms dealer Victor Bout.
