= Cleveland Cram =

Cleveland C. Cram (December 21, 1917, Waterville, Minnesota – January 9, 1999) was a station chief and historian for the United States Central Intelligence Agency (CIA).

Cram studied at Saint John's University and Harvard and served as a naval officer in the South Pacific during World War II. He was recruited by the CIA in 1949, and began working in London in 1953. As deputy station chief in London, he was responsible for the CIA's liaison with British intelligence services MI5 and MI6, and he later moved on to become station chief in the Netherlands and Canada.

After Cram's retirement in 1975, he was called back to do historical research on the record of Counterintelligence Chief James J. Angleton. After six years of work he completed the twelve-volume "History of the Counterintelligence Staff 1954–1974" (1981), which remains classified. In 1993 he completed the monograph "Of Moles and Molehunters: A Review of Counterintelligence Literature, 1977–92", which was declassified in 2003.
