= Cold War (1948–1953) =

Phase of the Cold War

The Cold War (1948–1953) is the period within the Cold War from the incapacitation of the Allied Control Council in 1948 to the conclusion of the Korean War in 1953.

The list of world leaders in these years is as follows:

- 1948–49: Clement Attlee (UK); Harry Truman (US); Joseph Stalin (USSR); Chiang Kai-shek (China)
- 1950–51: Clement Attlee (UK); Harry Truman (US); Joseph Stalin (USSR); Mao Zedong (Communist China)
- 1952–53: Winston Churchill (UK); Harry Truman (US); Joseph Stalin (USSR); Mao Zedong (Communist China)

== Europe ==
=== Berlin Blockade ===
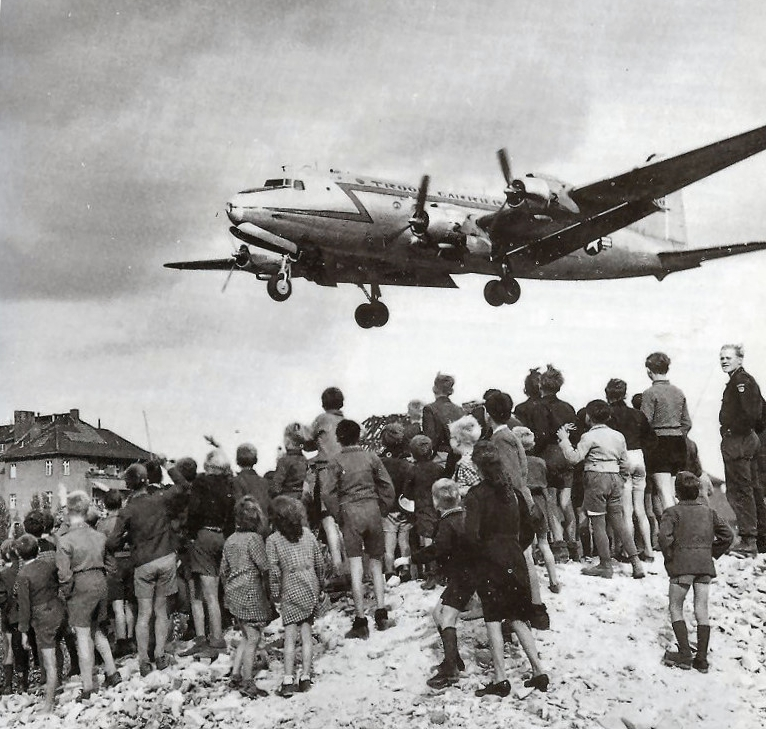
Berliners watching a C-54 land at Tempelhof Airport (1948)

After the Marshall Plan, the introduction of a new currency to Western Germany to replace the debased Reichsmark and massive electoral losses for communist parties in 1946, in June 1948, the Soviet Union cut off surface road access to Berlin.

On the day of the Berlin Blockade, a Soviet representative told the other occupying powers "We are warning both you and the population of Berlin that we shall apply economic and administrative sanctions that will lead to circulation in Berlin exclusively of the currency of the Soviet occupation zone."

Thereafter, street and water communications were severed, rail and barge traffic was stopped and the Soviets initially stopped supplying food to the civilian population in the non-Soviet sectors of Berlin. Because Berlin was located within the Soviet-occupied zone of Germany and the other occupying powers had previously relied on Soviet good will for access to Berlin, the only available methods of supplying the city were three limited air corridors.

By February 1948, because of massive post-war military cuts, the entire United States army had been reduced to 552,000 men. Military forces in non-Soviet Berlin sectors totaled only 8,973 Americans, 7,606 British and 6,100 French. Soviet military forces in the Soviet sector that surrounded Berlin totaled one and a half million men. The two United States regiments in Berlin would have provided little resistance against a Soviet attack. Believing that Britain, France and the United States had little option other than to acquiesce, the Soviet Military Administration in Germany celebrated the beginning of the blockade. Thereafter, a massive aerial supply campaign of food, water and other goods was initiated by the United States, Britain, France and other countries. The Soviets derided "the futile attempts of the Americans to save face and to maintain their untenable position in Berlin." The success of the airlift eventually caused the Soviets to lift their blockade in May 1949.

However, the Soviet Army was still capable of conquering Western Europe without much difficulty. In September 1948, US military intelligence experts estimated that the Soviets had about 485,000 troops in their German occupation zone and in Poland, and some 1.785 million troops in Europe in total. At the same time, the number of US troops in 1948 was about 140,000.

=== Tito–Stalin Split ===
After disagreements between Yugoslavian leader Josip Broz Tito and the Soviet Union regarding Greece and the People's Republic of Albania, the Tito–Stalin Split occurred, followed by Yugoslavia being expelled from the Cominform in June 1948 and a brief failed Soviet putsch in Belgrade. The split created two separate communist forces in Europe. A vehement campaign against "Titoism" was immediately started in the Eastern Bloc, describing agents of both the West and Tito in all places engaging in subversive activity. This resulted in the persecution of many major party cadres, including those in East Germany.

=== NATO ===
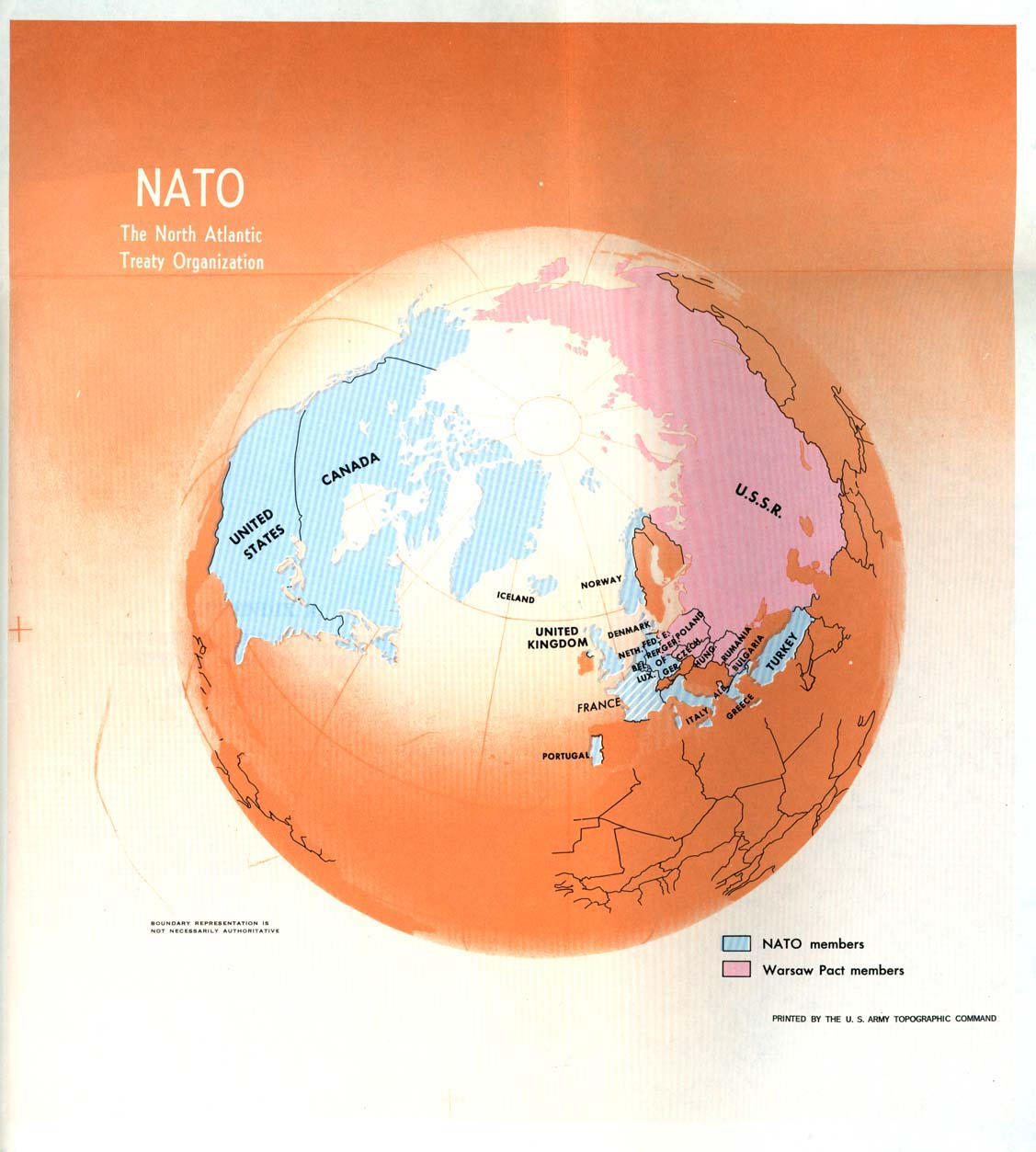
NATO v. the Warsaw Pact

The United States joined Britain, France, Canada, Denmark, Portugal, Norway, Belgium, Iceland, Luxembourg, Italy, and the Netherlands in 1949 to form the North Atlantic Treaty Organization (NATO), the United States' first "entangling" European alliance in 170 years. West Germany, Spain, Greece, and Turkey would later join this alliance. The Eastern leaders retaliated against these steps by integrating the economies of their nations in Comecon, their version of the Marshall Plan; exploding the first Soviet atomic device in 1949; signing an alliance with People's Republic of China in February 1950; and forming the Warsaw Pact, Eastern Europe's counterpart to NATO, in 1955. The Soviet Union, Albania, Czechoslovakia, Hungary, East Germany, Bulgaria, Romania, and Poland founded this military alliance.

=== NSC 68 ===
U.S. officials quickly moved to escalate and expand "containment." In a secret 1950 document, NSC 68, they proposed to strengthen their alliance systems, quadruple defense spending, and embark on an elaborate propaganda campaign to convince the U.S. public to fight this costly cold war. Truman ordered the development of a hydrogen bomb. In early 1950, the U.S. took its first efforts to oppose communist forces in Vietnam; planned to form a West German army, and prepared proposals for a peace treaty with Japan that would guarantee long-term U.S. military bases there.

== Outside Europe ==
The Cold War took place worldwide, but it had a partially different timing and trajectory outside Europe.

In Africa, decolonization took place first; it was largely accomplished in the 1950s and 1960s. The main rivals then sought bases of support in the new national political alignments. In Latin America, the first major confrontation took place in Guatemala in 1954 when the United States overthrew the Guatemalan president Jacobo Árbenz for being a socialist. When the new Castro government of Cuba turned to Soviets support in 1960, Cuba became the center of the anti-American Cold War forces, supported by the Soviet Union.

=== Chinese Civil War ===
As Japan's empire collapsed in 1945 the civil war resumed in China between the Kuomintang (KMT) led by Generalissimo Chiang Kai-shek and the Chinese Communist Party led by Mao Zedong. The USSR had signed a Treaty of Friendship with the Kuomintang in 1945 and disavowed support for the Chinese Communists. The outcome was closely fought, with the Communists finally prevailing with superior military tactics. Although the Nationalists had an advantage in numbers of men and weapons, initially controlled a much larger territory and population than their adversaries, and enjoyed considerable international support, they were exhausted by the long war with Japan and the attendant internal responsibilities like hyperinflation, political corruption and low public support for the government. In addition, the Chinese Communists were able to fill the political vacuum left in Manchuria after Soviet forces withdrew from the area and thus gained China's prime industrial base. The Chinese Communists were able to fight their way from the north and northeast, and virtually all of mainland China was taken by the end of 1949. On October 1, 1949, Mao Zedong proclaimed the People's Republic of China (PRC). Chiang Kai-shek and 600,000 Nationalist troops and 2 million refugees, predominantly from the government and business community, fled from the mainland to the island of Taiwan. In December 1949, Chiang proclaimed Taipei the temporary capital of the Republic of China (ROC) and continued to assert his government as the sole legitimate authority in China.

The continued hostility between the Communists on the mainland and the Nationalists on Taiwan continued throughout the Cold War. Though the United States refused to aide Chiang Kai-shek in his hope to "recover the mainland," it continued supporting the Republic of China with military supplies and expertise to prevent Taiwan from falling into PRC hands. Through the support of the Western bloc (most Western countries continued to recognize the ROC as the sole legitimate government of China), the Republic of China on Taiwan retained China's seat in the United Nations until 1971 when the UN successfully passed UN Resolution 2758.

=== Madiun Affair ===
The Madiun Affair took place on September 18, 1948, in the city of Madiun, East Java. This rebellion was carried out by the Front Demokrasi Rakyat (FDR, People's Democratic Front) which united all socialist and communist groups in Indonesia. This rebellion ended 3 months later after its leaders were arrested and executed by the TNI.

This revolt began with the fall of the Amir Syarifuddin Cabinet due to the signing of the Renville Agreement which benefited the Dutch and was eventually replaced by the Hatta Cabinet which did not belong to the left wing. This led Amir Syarifuddin to declare opposition to the Hatta Cabinet government and to declare the formation of the People's Democratic Front.

Before it, In the PKI Politburo session on August 13–14, 1948, Musso, an Indonesian communist figure, introduced a political concept called "Jalan Baru". He also wanted a single Marxism party called the PKI (Communist Party of Indonesia) consisting of illegal communists, the Labour Party of Indonesia, and Partai Sosialis (Socialist Party).

On September 18, 1948, the FDR declared the formation of the Republic of Soviet-Indonesia. In addition, the communists also carried out a rebellion in the Pati Residency and the kidnapping of groups who were considered to be against communists. Even this rebellion resulted in the murder of the Governor of East Java at the time, Raden Mas Tumenggung Ario Soerjo.

The crackdown operation against this movement began. This operation was led by A.H. Nasution. The Indonesian government also applied Commander General Sudirman to the Military Operations Movement I where General Sudirman ordered Colonel Gatot Soebroto and Colonel Sungkono to mobilize the TNI and police to crush the rebellion.

On September 30, 1948, Madiun was captured again by the Republic of Indonesia. Musso was shot dead on his escape in Sumoroto and Amir Syarifuddin was executed after being captured in Central Java. In early December 1948, the Madiun Affair crackdown was declared complete.

== Korean War ==
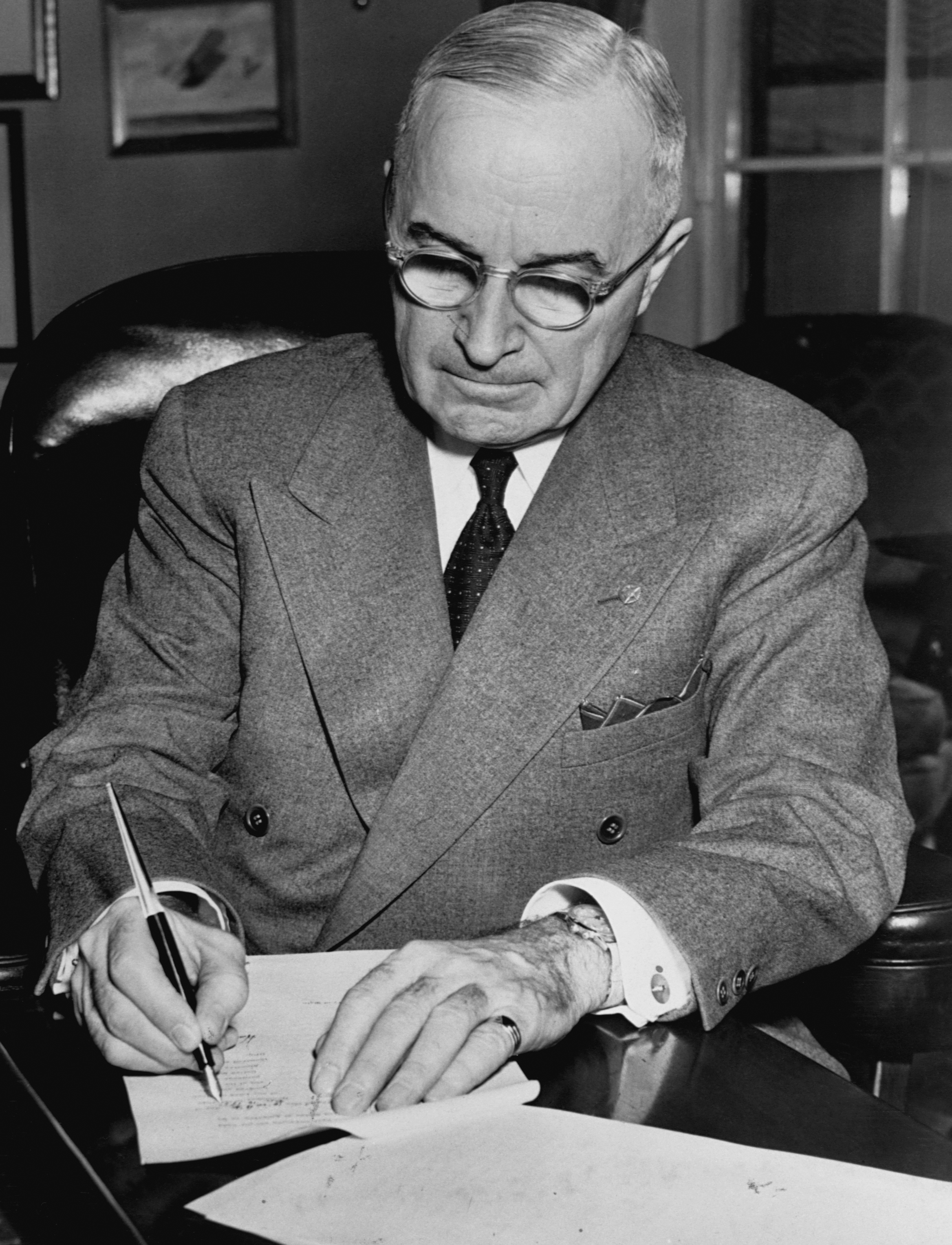
President Truman signing a proclamation declaring a national emergency that initiates U.S. involvement in the Korean War.

In early 1950, the United States made its first commitment to form a peace treaty with Japan that would guarantee long-term U.S. military bases. Some observers (including George Kennan) believed that the Japanese treaty led Stalin to approve a plan to invade U.S.-supported South Korea on June 25, 1950. Korea had been divided at the end of World War II along the 38th parallel into Soviet and U.S. occupation zones, in which a communist government was installed in the North by the Soviets, and an elected government in the South came to power after UN-supervised elections in 1948.

In June 1950, Kim Il Sung's North Korean People's Army invaded South Korea. Fearing that communist Korea under a Kim Il Sung dictatorship could threaten Japan and foster other communist movements in Asia, Truman committed U.S. forces and obtained help from the United Nations to counter the North Korean invasion. The Soviets boycotted UN Security Council meetings while protesting the council's failure to seat the People's Republic of China and, thus, did not veto the council's approval of UN action to oppose the North Korean invasion. A joint UN force of personnel from South Korea, the United States, Britain, Turkey, Canada, Australia, France, the Philippines, the Netherlands, Belgium, New Zealand, Ethiopia and other countries joined to stop the invasion. After a Chinese invasion to assist the North Koreans, fighting stabilized along the 38th parallel, which had separated the Koreas. Truman faced a hostile China, a Sino-Soviet partnership, and a defense budget that had quadrupled in eighteen months.

The Korean Armistice Agreement was signed in July 1953 after the death of Stalin, who had been insisting that the North Koreans continue fighting. In North Korea, Kim Il Sung created a highly centralized and brutal dictatorship, according himself unlimited power and generating a formidable cult of personality.

== Hydrogen bomb ==
A hydrogen bomb—which produced nuclear fusion instead of nuclear fission—was first tested by the United States in November 1952 and the Soviet Union in August 1953. Such bombs were first deployed in the 1960s.

== Culture and media ==
Duck and Cover

Fear of a nuclear war spurred the production of public safety films by the United States federal government's Civil Defense branch that demonstrated ways on protecting oneself from a Soviet nuclear attack. The 1951 children's film Duck and Cover is a prime example.

George Orwell's classic dystopia Nineteen Eighty-Four was published in 1949. The novel explores life in an imagined future world where a totalitarian government has achieved terrifying levels of power and control. With Nineteen Eighty-Four, Orwell taps into the anti-communist fears that would continue to haunt so many in the West for decades to come. In a Cold War setting his descriptions could hardly fail to evoke comparison to Soviet communism and the seeming willingness of Stalin and his successors to control those within the Soviet bloc by whatever means necessary. Orwell's famous allegory of totalitarian rule, Animal Farm, published in 1945, provoked similar anti-communist sentiments.

== See also ==
- Western Union
- History of the Soviet Union (1927–1953)
- History of the United States (1945–1964)
- Timeline of events in the Cold War
- Animal Farm
