= Cold War (board game) =

1984 board game

Cold War is a 1984 board game published by Victory Games.

== Gameplay ==
Cold War is a game in which four players control global superpowers vying for world domination.

== Reviews ==
- Casus Belli #25
- Games #64
