= USS Nereus (AC-10) =

Collier of the United States Navy

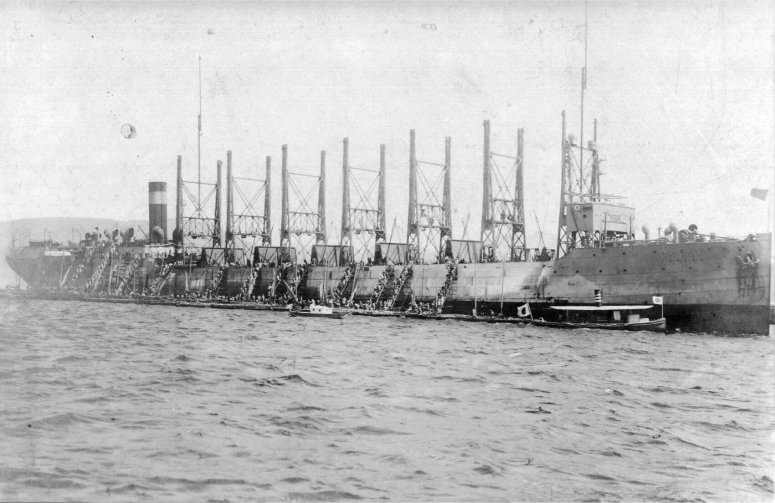
- Nereus loads coal at Nagasaki, Japan in April 1916

History

United States
- Name: USS Nereus
- Namesake: Nereus
- Builder: Newport News Shipbuilding and Dry Dock Company
- Laid down: 4 December 1911
- Launched: 26 April 1913
- Commissioned: 10 September 1913
- Decommissioned: 30 June 1922
- Stricken: 5 December 1940
- Fate: Sold, 27 February 1941; Lost at sea, December 1941

General characteristics
- Class & type: Proteus-class collier
- Displacement: 19,360 long tons (19,670 t) (full load)
- Length: 542 ft (165 m)
- Beam: 65 ft (20 m)
- Draft: 27 ft 9 in (8.46 m)
- Speed: 15 kn (17 mph; 28 km/h)
- Complement: 236 officers and enlisted

USS Nereus (AC-10) was one of four Proteus-class colliers built for the United States Navy before World War I. Named for Nereus, an aquatic deity from Greek mythology, she was the second U.S. Naval vessel to bear the name. Nereus was laid down on 4 December 1911, and launched on 26 April 1913 by the Newport News Shipbuilding and Dry Dock Company, Newport News, Virginia, and commissioned on 10 September 1913.

== Service history ==
Detached from Naval Overseas Transportation Service on 12 September 1919, Nereus served with the Atlantic Fleet until decommissioned at Norfolk on 30 June 1922. She was laid up there until struck from the Navy List on 5 December 1940. Sold to the Aluminium Company of Canada on 27 February 1941, Nereus operated out of Montreal carrying bauxite from the Caribbean to aluminum plants in the United States and Canada. Her master (commanding officer) was John Thomas Bennett of the Canadian Merchant Navy.

=== Loss ===
Nereus was lost at sea sometime after 10 December 1941 while steaming from St. Thomas in the Virgin Islands, along the same route where her sister ship, USS Cyclops had disappeared towards the end of World War I. Nereus carried a cargo of ore destined to make aluminum for Allied aircraft, and was presumed sunk after being torpedoed by a German U-boat. However, there are no German U-boat claims for this vessel. It has been suggested that both Nereus and Cyclops could have been lost to U-boats which were later lost themselves to Allied action or storms at sea. In the case of Cyclops this seems unlikely, as records show that in 1918 only four U-boats were active off the US coast. As for Nereus, a far greater number of boats that might have operated off the US coast were lost in 1941, so no conclusion can be considered justified by available evidence.

The wreckage of Nereus has never been located, nor the actual cause of her disappearance determined. A memorial listing for her crew can be found on the CWGC Halifax memorial.
