= Martel affair =

1962 French spy scandal

The Martel affair, sometimes known as the Sapphire affair, was a spy scandal that took place in France in early 1962. It involved information provided by former high-ranking member of the KGB, Anatoliy Golitsyn, who defected to the United States in December 1961. Golitsyn stated that the Soviets had agents placed throughout French military intelligence and even within French President Charles de Gaulle's cabinet. He claimed that these agents had access to any NATO document on demand.

The news so alarmed US President John F. Kennedy that he sent a courier to hand-deliver a message to de Gaulle that outlined the situation. Over the spring and the summer of 1962, a team of French counterintelligence officers interrogated Golitsyn for weeks. As his identity was closely guarded by the US, the French assigned him the codename "Martel". Their interrogations overcame their initial suspicion that he was a CIA double agent and they returned to France with grave warnings about the state of French security.

French-American relations were already strained by de Gaulle's policy of Grandeur, and in return, de Gaulle was highly skeptical of the US's motives. Believing the story to be a fabrication, French intelligence was very deliberate in its investigations, and no action had been taken by late 1962, to the amazement of the US establishment, which began to take measures to exclude France from the NATO reporting chain. That led to NATO becoming largely non-functional for a year. Ultimately there was a three-year breakdown in American-French intelligence sharing.

The story became public only some years later, when the former French intelligence liaison at the French embassy in Washington, Philippe Thyraud de Vosjoli, reported the story in an exposé in Life magazine in 1968. A friend of de Vosjoli, Leon Uris, used a highly fictionalized version of the affair as the basis for the novel and the movie Topaz.

== Anatoliy Golitsyn ==
In 1961, Anatoliy Golitsyn, a major in the KGB, was assigned to the embassy in Helsinki, Finland, under the name "Ivan Klimov." On 15 December, he defected to the US, along with his wife and daughter, by riding the train to the Swedish border. Golitsyn's defection so alarmed the KGB that orders were sent out to cancel all meetings with field agents out of fear that they would be identified.

Golitsyn was flown to the US and interviewed by David Murphy, the head of the CIA's Soviet Russia Division. After some time, Golitsyn began making increasing demands of the US and complaining about his treatment. Considering him to be unreliable, Murphy passed him on to James Jesus Angleton, the CIA's director of counterintelligence. Golitsyn's description of a traitor in the CIA, whom he knew only as "Sasha", led Angleton to embark on a multiyear manhunt that accused many members of the CIA of being the spy. The entire affair is still highly controversial.

Golitsyn's information ultimately led to the identification or the confirmation of Soviet spies throughout the Western world, including Kim Philby, Donald Duart Maclean, Guy Burgess, the potential double agent Aleksander Kopatzky, and many others. He also claimed that their contacts had so infiltrated NATO that they were able to produce any secret document within a few days. So much information had been received that the KGB was using NATO's own document numbers to catalog them. He could not identify the NATO mole directly but knew that he spoke French. He also suggested the existence of a widespread network of KGB spies within the various branches of the French military and government offices.

== Kennedy's letter ==
Kennedy was alarmed by the implications of a French spy within NATO. Unable to trust any official communications network, he took the unusual route of handwriting a personal letter to de Gaulle and having it delivered directly to him by a courier. After outlining the worrying information, the letter went on to offer to de Gaulle direct access to the agent by members of the French security services.

The letter arrived at a time when US-French relations were at a low point. In the postwar period, both the US and the UK had set up spy networks in Paris with the explicit aim of spying on the Soviets but also with the secondary role of keeping an eye on political developments in France. The French were well aware of those networks but tolerated them until the 1950s. However, de Gaulle's policy of grandeur demanded for France to be able to keep its own secrets, and he began a policy to attempt to break down those networks. He ordered the SDECE to begin those efforts in January 1962.

De Gaulle expected there to be some sort of reprisal on the part of the CIA, and he went as far as falsely believing that the US might be behind the Organisation de l'armée secrète (OAS), which tried to assassinate him. All of that was taking place while Kennedy's letter arrived. That led the French to believe that the entire affair might be a CIA-led effort to discredit and shake up the French services, but a personal letter from the US president could not be ignored.

== French interrogations ==
De Gaulle responded by placing Jean-Louis de Rougemont in charge of determining whether it was true that Martel was a Soviet defector. De Rougemont was the director of the Second Division of the National Defense staff, which had the task of co-ordinating the various intelligence services. He also had deep personal contacts with his counterparts in the US establishment. He flew to Washington, DC, in the spring of 1962 to meet with his contacts and was granted three or four days of personal interviews with Golitsyn, whose identity was still a highly guarded secret and so he was referred to only as "Martel." Initially believing Martel to be a ride, created by the US, de Rougemont was convinced otherwise by his meetings.

De Rougemont made his report directly to Étienne Burin des Roziers, the Secretary-General of the Élysée, who organized a meeting with the heads of the Service de Documentation Extérieure et de Contre-Espionnage (SDECE) and the Direction de la Securite du Territoire (DST), responsible for external and internal security. They had been aware of rumors that a high-ranking defector was in CIA hands, and des Roziers told them that the defector was real, he was as important as the rumors suggested, and his information about French security demanded an immediate detailed debriefing by counterintelligence experts.

A mission was quickly arranged and arrived in Washington, DC, in May. Liaising with the French intelligence attaché, de Vosjoli, a safe house was provided for the team. He was upset to learn that previous meetings had taken place without his involvement and that the letter from Kennedy to de Gaulle, being nonspecific, had impugned the entire French establishment. He initially believed that Martel might be a double agent on a mission of upsetting French-US relations. However, the team's reports, which he forwarded to Paris, quickly convinced him otherwise.

In one particularly telling series of questions, the French officers attempted to trap Martel. Since he claimed that he had personally seen a number of NATO reports in Moscow, the team provided Martel with a range of documents, some real and some fake. Martel was able to identify a few of them as having been personally seen by him, but he identified all of those that were real he stated every one of the fake documents as not having seen them. That development was extremely worrying. He then went on to provide a complete description of the organization and the operation of the SDECE, including details of a secret reorganization in 1958.

When pressed for details on the identities of agents, Martel was able to provide only details of their operations and general descriptions. He had only seen their reports and was not involved in their actual operations, but he was aware, in general terms, of what positions they held. Returning to France after two weeks of interrogations, the team looked over the interviews and attempted to identify various details. They returned to Washington again to confirm their suspicions with Martel, who was able to eliminate many of their guesses and to suggest others that matched the details that he knew. That led to the identification of widespread networks within the Ministry of the Interior; Defense and Foreign Affairs; a member of de Gaulle's cabinet; an entire network of twelve agents, known as "Sapphire," operating within the SDECE and a second network within the SDECE that was specifically tasked with passing on US nuclear secrets.

== Increasing suspicion ==
It was the last item that led to intense distrust of the information within French intelligence. Martel claimed that the nuclear network had been created by the KGB in 1959. Although there was such an effort taking place, it had been created by the French in 1960. The plan was started by Louis Joxe, tasked by de Gaulle with building the force de frappe, France's nuclear efforts. Joxe had concluded that France could not make a modern force on its own and needed to steal US designs. That led the SDECE to believe that the CIA had become aware of French plans and so had planted the story with Martel to scare the French into canceling them. As one official put it:

We could never be sure whether it was Martel talking or the CIA. We accepted that there was a French spy in NATO. We decided to track him down. But none of our men got more than vague hints from Martel that there was anyone beyond this man. All the talk of someone in high places came via the CIA. I assure you, that although we treated that information with some circumspection — because of our suspicions of the CIA, you see — we made every effort to find such a man. But we were never given any specific leads.

US agents sat in on the French debriefing meetings, but that curiously further strained relations. Every time that the French team attempted to confirm or to deny a name as one that Martel had heard of, the US became highly suspicious of that name. Since the team tried many names, the US was concerned that the entire French government was involved. That was, however, minor compared to anger over news that the French were apparently setting up a nuclear intelligence team.

General Paul Jacquier, who had recently been appointed as head of the SDECE, arrived in Washington on 5 October 1962. His mission was to inform the US that France would be expanding the SDECE to a worldwide organization that would operate against both the East and the West. The British intelligence services had arrested Vassall and were in the process of rounding up many of the other agents who had been alluded to by Martel. The French, on the other hand, had done nothing. At a formal dinner in Jacquier's honor, the US made it clear that its patience was at an end and that it expected action soon. One agent went so far as to state to Jacquier, "Your service is infiltrated. We know that you are not at fault, because you are new in your job and new at this business. But you must take the right measures."

== Major effects but little action ==
NATO had been strained in the early 1960s by an effort to form a multinational naval nuclear agreement that ended in acrimonious debate. It was into that environment that the Martel affair exploded. By the autumn of 1962, the affair had largely ended the flow of information with NATO, with only the most basic information, which was needed to keep it running, being exchanged.

That led to the first suggestions outside France that Martel might be a double agent. Critics pointed out that Martel's leads were generally for agents that had been in place for many years but were well past their prime in terms of having access to useful information. However, that information was responsible for the near-collapse of NATO.

However, as the full weight of the information worked its way through various countries' intelligence apparatus, the conclusion that he was telling the truth became unavoidable. Among the military alone, John Vassall of the UK Admiralty, Swedish Defense Ministry official Stig Wennerström, Canadian economist (working at NATO) Hugh Hambleton, German Federal Intelligence Service operative Heinz Felfe, and US Army Sergeant (working at the National Security Agency) Jack Dunlap were all exposed as a result of Martel's reports.

France, on the other hand, did little with the information. The efforts to track down the NATO spy led to the only French public action on the Martel case. Georges Pâques was arrested on suspicion of spying on 23 September 1963 and ultimately admitted to having spied for the Soviets since 1944. Pâques was one of France's most senior officials at NATO and was naturally suspected as source of many of the papers that Martel had seen. However, since Pâques had become active in NATO only in 1962, he could not be the source of the earlier information that had been seen by Martel. It is now believed that the French-speaking Hambleton was the actual source of the papers, but he was not uncovered until years later.

A number of other possibilities were investigated, but no damning evidence was ever found. Among these was Joxe, whose suggestion of spying on IS nuclear secrets could have been a Soviet plan that he was carrying out. Diplomat George Gorse was also suspected, followed by, in a strange turn of events, both the deputy head of the SDECE, Léonard Hounay, and the head of the DST, René Delsen, who had debriefed Martel in 1962. After another meeting with Martel in November, Hounay was quietly dismissed, but no other overt action was taken. It is speculated that the critical political climate in France after the Algerian War had led de Gaulle to bury the story for fears of a right-wing coup.

Whether or not anyone was highly placed is open to speculation. Golitsyn had told the US that there was a similar highly placed spy within the CIA whom he knew only by the codename "Sasha". That led Angleton on a multiyear, increasingly paranoid, mole hunt, which ultimately proved fruitless. His handpicked investigator, Clare Edward Petty, once concluded that it might be Angleton himself who was the spy, working in concert with Golitsyn, a double agent. Aspersions were cast across the CIA and outside it, and many people's careers were ruined when Angleton suggested they might be Sasha.

== Resignation of de Vosjoli ==
According to de Vosjoli's account, a number of sinister events suggested that the SDECE was as deeply penetrated as Martel had suggested.

In the early summer of 1962, de Vosjoli became aware of rumors of a Soviet buildup in Cuba, apparently of surface-to-air missiles. He flew to Havana in August, where he began to receive reports that a new type of missile was also being seen that was much larger. They included reports from a former French officer who could tell the difference between the two models. De Vosjoli passed that information on to the director of the CIA, John McCone, who thanked him for his efforts.

Jacquier called de Vosjoli to Paris in December and made two demands: for him to turn over the names of all his contacts in Cuba and to start setting up a network within the US to spy on its nuclear technology. The demands astounded de Vosjoli since it contradicted the only story that Martel had stated not to appear to have any basis, but de Vosjoli was now being asked to set up just that network. However, a reason was given: the French had learned that the US and UK had just arranged the Nassau Agreement to give the UK access to US nuclear technology, and the French could no longer wait to set up their efforts.

In February 1963, de Vosjoli forwarded a lengthy report from one of his Cuban contacts containing details of Soviet forces in Cuba. The SDECE demanded him turn over the name of his contact, which he finally revealed. The agent was soon arrested by the Cubans, and de Vosjoli was advised that his name was also known to the Cubans and so he should no longer visit Cuba.

It was that series of events that led de Vosjoli to contact Hervé Alphand, the French ambassador to the US. Alphand contacted trusted members of the Ministry of Foreign Affairs and found that they were entirely unaware of the issue since the SDECE had not informed them of the Martel information. The SDECE immediately identified de Vosjoli as the source of the request and informed him on 16 September that he was being replaced. He did not return to France and is considered to be the only example of a French intelligence officer defecting to the US.

French inaction on the Martel case, combined with de Vosjoli's very public dismissal, eventually led to a complete breakdown in French-US intelligence-sharing in 1964. The issues were not entirely cleared up for three years, when normal communications resumed.

== Sources ==
- Arboit, Gérald (May 2007). "How The CIA Counterintelligence Staff Broke the Western Intelligence Community for Ten Years (1962–1973)". Centre français de recherche sur le renseignement. Archived from the original on 2014-07-01.
- Barry, John (26 April 1968). "Broad Impact of "Martel" Everywhere but France". Life. pp. 38–39.
- de Vosjoli, Philippe Thyraud (26 April 1968). "So Much Has Been Swept under the Rug". Life. pp. 32–37.
- staff (26 April 1968). "A Head That Holds Some Sinister Secrets". Life. pp. 30–31.
- Mason, Fergus (2014). Stranger Than Fiction: The Real Life Stories Behind Alfred Hitchcock's Greatest Works. Absolute Crime.
- Richelson, Jeffrey (1997). A Century of Spies: Intelligence in the Twentieth Century. Oxford University Press. ISBN 978-0-19-976173-9.
