= Topaz (1969 film) =

1969 film by Alfred Hitchcock

- Theatrical release poster
- Directed by: Alfred Hitchcock
- Screenplay by: Samuel A. Taylor
- Based on: Topaz (1967 novel) by Leon Uris
- Produced by: Alfred Hitchcock
- Starring: Frederick Stafford; Dany Robin; John Vernon; Karin Dor; Claude Jade; Michel Subor; Michel Piccoli; Philippe Noiret; Roscoe Lee Browne; John Forsythe
- Cinematography: Jack Hildyard
- Edited by: William H. Ziegler
- Music by: Maurice Jarre
- Production company: Universal Pictures
- Distributed by: Universal Pictures
- Release date: December 19, 1969 (U.S.)
- Running time: 126 minutes (theatrical cut); 143 minutes (extended cut)
- Country: United States
- Language: English
- Budget: $6 million
- Box office: $6 million

Theatrical trailer.

Topaz is a 1969 American political thriller spy film directed and produced by Alfred Hitchcock, adapted by Samuel A. Taylor from Leon Uris' 1967 novel. It stars Frederick Stafford, Dany Robin, Karin Dor, John Vernon, Claude Jade, Michel Subor, Michel Piccoli, Philippe Noiret, Roscoe Lee Browne and John Forsythe. The film is about a French intelligence agent (Stafford) who becomes entangled in Cold War politics before the 1962 Cuban Missile Crisis and then the breakup of an international Soviet spy ring.

The story is loosely based on the 1962 Sapphire Affair, which involved the head of France's SDECE in the United States, the spy Philippe Thyraud de Vosjoli, a friend of Uris, who played an important role in "helping the U.S. discover the presence of Russian offensive missiles in Cuba."

Topaz was released by Universal Pictures on December 19, 1969. It received mixed reviews from critics and was a commercial disappointment, though it did win Best Director and Best Supporting Actor (for Philippe Noiret) accolades from the National Board of Review.

== Plot ==
In Copenhagen in 1962, a high-ranking Soviet intelligence officer, Boris Kusenov, defects to the West. During debriefing, CIA agent Mike Nordstrom learns that Soviet missiles with nuclear warheads will be placed in Cuba.

Needing physical evidence, Nordstrom discloses Kusenov's name to French agent André Devereaux and asks him to bribe Luis Uribe, a member of Cuba's UN delegation, to provide photographs of documents that confirm the missile bases in Cuba. Devereaux decides to accompany his daughter, Michèle, on her honeymoon to New York City with his son-in-law, François Picard. André's wife Nicole is worried that André is using the family trip to work for Nordstrom in New York.

In New York City, French agent Philippe Dubois is to contact Uribe, who is the secretary to Cuban official Rico Parra, who is staying at the Hotel Theresa in Harlem to show solidarity with the Black community.

Dubois sneaks into the hotel and bribes Uribe to take the documents from Parra's office to photograph. Parra catches Dubois photographing the documents. Chased and shot at by Cuban revolutionaries, Dubois purposefully knocks into Devereaux, who is watching events from the other side of the street, and slips him the camera. A red-headed Cuban guard helps Devereaux to get up but lets him go. Dubois escapes into the crowd around the hotel.

Dubois's photos confirm that the Soviets are placing missiles in Cuba. Devereaux, despite accusations of infidelity by his wife Nicole, flies to Cuba. His mistress, Juanita de Cordoba, was the widow of a "hero of the Revolution," which enables her to work undercover in the resistance. Upon his arrival, Devereaux finds Parra, another of her lovers, leaving Juanita's mansion. Devereaux asks Juanita to take photographs of the missiles. Juanita's loyal domestic staff, Carlotta and Pablo Mendoza, pose as picnickers and photograph the missiles. Pursued, the two hide the incriminating film before they are captured.

During a mass rally and a lengthy speech by the líder máximo, the red-headed Cuban guard recognises Devereaux's face from earlier.

Parra has heard from the tortured Carlotta Mendoza that Juanita is their leader. He embraces and shoots Carlotta to spare her from extreme torture.

At the Havana airport, the Cuban authorities fail to find the microfilms that Deveraux has. He returns to find that Nicole has left him. Devereaux is recalled to Paris. Before he leaves, Kusenov tells him about the existence of a Soviet spy organization, "Topaz," within the French intelligence service. He is given the name of NATO official Henri Jarré, who leaked documents to the KGB.

In Paris, André is picked up at the airport by Michèle and François. He accompanies Michèle to a cocktail party at his friend Jacques Granville's house. Michèle wants to reconcile her parents, as Nicole has found out about André's affair with Juanita. When Michèle asks her mother to help her father, she refuses. At the party, Jacques confesses to a friend that he once liked Nicole, but that she married André. André invites some of his old friends and colleagues, including Granville and Jarré, to a lunch at a fine Paris restaurant under the pretext of helping Devereaux prepare for his inquiry. Devereaux tells the others about Topaz to provoke some reaction. Jarré claims that it is misinformation and that Kusenov died a year ago.

Jarré panics and visits the leader of the spy ring, Jacques Granville. Devereaux, Nicole, and Granville were close friends from their days together during the French Resistance. Granville tells Jarré that it was a mistake to say Kusenov was dead since the Americans will easily discover that Jarré lied. As Jarré leaves Granville's house, Nicole arrives to meet Granville, who is her lover. She glimpses Jarré departing.

Devereaux sends his son-in-law, François, to interview Jarré and coax him into admitting something. Before François can succeed, two mysterious men show up. Devereaux and Michèle rush to Jarré's flat and find Jarré dead, a staged suicide, and François missing. François returns to Michèle's apartment and says he was clubbed and kidnapped, but managed to escape from his captors' car after overhearing the phone number of their boss, known as Columbine, the head of Topaz.

Nicole recognizes François's sketch of Jarré as the man she saw leaving Granville's house, and recognizes the phone number as Granville's. She tearfully tells her family that Granville must be the leader of Topaz. Granville, exposed, commits suicide.

== Cast ==
- Frederick Stafford as André Devereaux
- Dany Robin as Nicole Devereaux
- Karin Dor as Juanita de Cordoba
- John Vernon as Rico Parra
- Claude Jade as Michèle Picard
- Michel Subor as François Picard
- Michel Piccoli as Jacques Granville
- Philippe Noiret as Henri Jarré
- Roscoe Lee Browne as Philippe Dubois
- Per-Axel Arosenius as Boris Kusenov
- John Forsythe as Michael Nordstrom
- Edmon Ryan as McKittreck
- Sonja Kolthoff as Mrs. Kusenov
- Tina Hedström as Tamara Kusenov
- John van Dreelen as Claude Martin
- Donald Randolph as Luis Uribe
- Roberto Contreras as Muñoz
- Carlos Rivas as Hernandez
- Roger Til as Jean Chabrier
- Lewis Charles as Pablo Mendoza
- Sándor Szabó as Emile Redon
- Anna Navarro as Carlotta Mendoza
- Lew Brown as American Official
- John Roper as Thomas
- George Skaff as René d'Arcy

Uncredited

- Ann Doran as Mrs Forsyth
- Eva Wilma as Rosita Gomez

Alfred Hitchcock's signature cameo appearance occurs around 28 minutes into the film. At the airport, he is seated in a wheelchair as he is being pushed by a nurse. She stops, and he nonchalantly stands and greets a man and proceeds to walk off screen with him.

== Production ==
=== Screenplay ===
Shel Talmy and William Piggott Brown first tried to option the film rights to Leon Uris's novel for $500,000 in 1967, but the deal was halted by the Bank of England because of the 1967 devaluation of the pound sterling. Alfred Hitchcock first hired Uris to adapt his own novel for the screen five months later. Afterwards Philippe de Vosjoli filed a lawsuit against Uris, Universal Pictures, and MCA Inc claiming that they had stolen the plot for the novel and film from his unpublished manuscript Le reseau Topaz. De Vosjoli and Uris settled out of court with a deal that would give Uris full rights to the profits from the film but gave de Vosjoli half of the profits from the novel.

Reportedly, Hitchcock and Uris differed on aspects of character development, with Hitchcock claiming that Uris had not humanised the villains of the story. Uris also did not appreciate Hitchcock's insistence on adding black humour. After a portion of the draft had been written, Uris left the film. Hitchcock attempted to hire Arthur Laurents to complete the work on the screenplay, but he refused, leaving an unfinished draft while the shooting schedule was rapidly approaching. Ultimately, Samuel A. Taylor, cowriter of Vertigo, was hired, but the film began without a completed screenplay. Some scenes were written only hours before they were filmed.

Hitchcock changed the script shortly before the beginning of filming, and the distributor, Universal, forced an ending that was different from the one that was preferred by Hitchcock. For Topaz, Hitchcock engaged the 19-year-old French actress Claude Jade from Truffaut's Stolen Kisses. She and Dany Robin, who was cast as her mother, would provide the glamour in the story. "Jade is a rather quiet young lady," Hitchcock later said, "but I wouldn't guarantee [that] about her behaviour in a taxi."

=== Production ===
Like his previous films Rope and The Trouble with Harry, Hitchcock intended the film to be an experiment for whether colours, predominantly red, yellow and white, could be used to reveal and to influence the plot. He later admitted that it did not work out.

Production began on September 25, 1968, and concluded at the beginning of March 1969. Portions of Topaz were filmed on location in Copenhagen; Wiesbaden, West Germany; Virginia, Paris, New York City, and Washington, DC. The remainder of the film was shot at Universal Studios Hollywood and in and around Los Angeles.

Prior to Hitchcock's decision to hire Maurice Jarre to compose the score, other composers who were interested in offering their services included Michel Legrand, Richard Rodney Bennett, and Ravi Shankar.

=== Alternative versions and endings ===
Hitchcock's first cut of the film ended with a duel between Devereaux and Granville in a French football stadium. It was shot by associate producer Herbert Coleman when Hitchcock had to return to the United States for a family emergency. Audiences panned the ending during test screenings. They also said the film was far too long.

Under pressure from the studio, Hitchcock shot a second ending that he actually liked better, with Granville escaping on an Aeroflot flight to the Soviet Union as Devereaux and Nicole board their adjacent Pan Am flight back to the United States. However, the ending apparently confused audiences. Also, screenwriter Samuel Taylor objected to the villain escaping unpunished, and there were fears that the ending would offend the French government.

As a compromise, Hitchcock used existing footage to create a third ending in which Granville is exposed and expelled from a NATO meeting. Over a shot of the exterior of his apartment, the sound of a gunshot tells that Granville commits suicide behind his drawn curtains, since no footage of his suicide existed.

The film was released theatrically with this third ending and was also edited down by nearly 20 minutes to a final length of 126 minutes. The "airport ending" briefly appeared on British prints of the film by mistake, but those prints were soon altered to match the version that was released elsewhere.

The 1987 laserdisc contained the 126-minute theatrical cut, along with the first release of the two alternate endings, as bonus features. The 1999 US DVD contained the first release of the extended 143-minute cut of the film, using Hitchcock's preferred second ending, in which Granville escapes. All three endings appear as extras on the US DVD, together with an "Appreciation" by Leonard Maltin in which Maltin discusses the deleted scenes and the alternate endings.

The extended cut adds a sequence after Devereaux returns to Paris, in which he is picked up at the airport by his daughter Michèle and his son-in-law François. Michèle brings Devereaux to a cocktail party held by Granville, which Nicole is also attending. Michèle hopes her parents will get along, but Nicole cannot forgive Devereaux's affair with Juanita. Devereaux and Michèle stay alone, and Granville complains to the agent Martin that he regrets that Nicole married Devereaux.

The longer 143-minute version of the film has since been released numerous times on DVD, Blu-ray and 4K Blu-Ray in the US and the UK. Most other countries worldwide have the shorter theatrical cut on DVD, Blu-ray and 4K Blu-ray.

== Reception ==
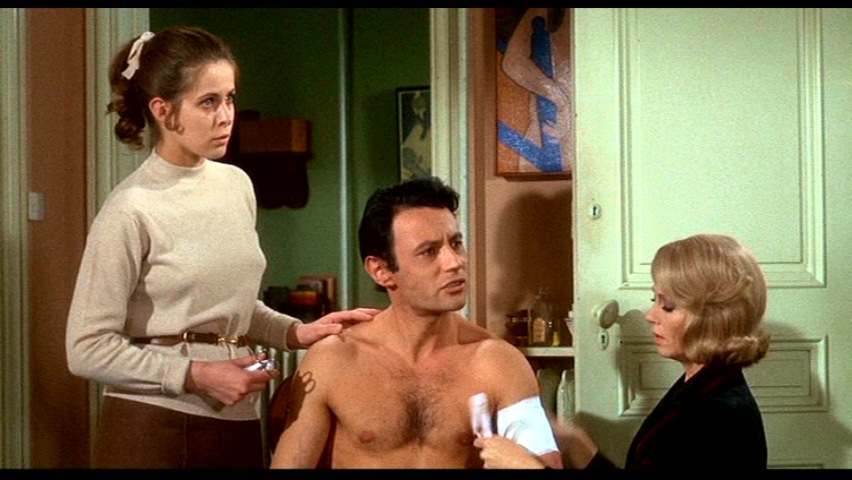
Claude Jade, Michel Subor, and Dany Robin in Topaz

=== Box office ===
Topaz earned $3.8 million in box office rentals from the United States and Canada in 1970.

=== Critical reaction ===
Vincent Canby of The New York Times placed the film on his year-end list of the ten best films of 1969 and declared it a "huge success, a quirky, episodic espionage tale made rich and suspenseful, not through conventional Hitchcockian narrative drive, but through odd, perverse Hitchcockian detail, economy of cinematic gesture, and an over-all point of view that can never for a moment be mistaken as belonging to anyone but Hitchcock." Kevin Thomas of the Los Angeles Times also liked the film and wrote that although there was a "loss of momentum" at the climax because of the time taken to resolve the complex plot, the first three quarters of the film were "bravura displays of the fabled Hitchcock technique, replete with dazzling camera movements and acute imagery." Thomas singled out the Harlem sequence as among "the best that Hitchcock has ever done."

Variety wrote that it "tends to move more solidly and less infectiously than many of the maestro of menace's best remembered pix. Yet Hitchcock has brought in a full quota of twists and tingling moments. It is just that the picture seems to move predictably and lacks the fun and surprise blood curdling moments that can lift his thrillers with breathtaking excitement." The Monthly Film Bulletin in Britain wrote that the film had "intermittent pleasures (the silent conversation behind hotel doors seen from across the street, the long pull back across the conference room and the reverse track forward ending with a zoom on to Piccoli's face), yet we are constantly deprived of the action set pieces which would have given the narrative its much needed boost. It is known that Hitchcock had trouble with the climax (and juggled three different endings); but the one finally chosen for the commercial print here looks as if it could have been devised by anyone." Gary Arnold of The Washington Post wrote, "The film as a whole dies from a lack of humor and animation.... The awful truth is that Hitchcock would probably be better off if he retired. The most one can say for his direction of 'Topaz' is that it's polished: The compositions are symmetrical and the photography is glossy. But if this is all it is, the film might as well be the work of a disinterested computer." Pauline Kael of The New Yorker called it "the same damned spy picture he's been making since the thirties, and it's getting longer, slower, and duller." John Simon described Topaz as both wretched and senile.

Some American critics complained that there was no Hollywood star in the movie such as Ingrid Bergman or Cary Grant although the cast included the renowned international film stars Claude Jade, Michel Piccoli, and Philippe Noiret, the last of whom had previous successes that had been primarily in France. Some attribute Hitchcock's casting choices to his negative experience of working with Paul Newman on Torn Curtain, but Hitchcock is said to have approached Sean Connery, who had worked with him in Marnie, for André and Catherine Deneuve for his wife. Some critics have inferred that Hitchcock was hoping to groom the relatively unknown Frederick Stafford as a star of his own making, like Tippi Hedren; however, Stafford remained unknown in Hollywood though he had a lengthy career in European films.

Topaz holds a 68% approval rating on Rotten Tomatoes based on 31 reviews, with an average rating of 6.2/10. On Metacritic, the film has a 61 out of 100 score, based on 10 reviews.

=== Awards and nominations ===
Institution	Year	Category	Nominee	Result
National Board of Review	1970	Top Ten Films		Won
National Board of Review	1970	Best Director	Alfred Hitchcock	Won
National Board of Review	1970	Best Supporting Actor	Philippe Noiret	Won

== Television airings ==
Topaz had its American network television premiere on NBC Saturday Night at the Movies on January 29, 1972.

== See also ==
- List of American films of 1969
- Martel affair
