= The Company (miniseries) =

2007 American miniseries

- DVD cover for The Company
- Created by: Robert Littell
- Developed by: Ken Nolan
- Directed by: Mikael Salomon
- Starring: Chris O'Donnell; Alfred Molina; Michael Keaton; Alessandro Nivola; Rory Cochrane; Tom Hollander; Alexandra Maria Lara; Natascha McElhone; Raoul Bova; Erika Marozsán; Mišel Matičević
- Composer: Jeff Beal
- Country of origin: United States
- No. of episodes: 3

Production
- Executive producers: John Calley; Ridley Scott; Tony Scott
- Producer: Robert Bernacchi
- Cinematography: Ben Nott
- Running time: 286 Mins
- Production companies: Scott Free Productions; John Calley Productions; Sony Pictures Television

Original release
- Network: TNT
- Release: August 5 – August 19, 2007

The Company is a three-part serial about the activities of the CIA during the Cold War. It was based on the best-selling 2002 novel of the same name by Robert Littell. The teleplay adaptation was written by Ken Nolan, who received a Writers Guild of America Award for Television: Long Form – Adapted. The series aired on TNT from August 5 to August 19, 2007.

== Synopsis ==
In 1950, the best friends Jack McAuliffe, Leo Kritzky, and Yevgeny Tsipin graduate from Yale and prepare to go their separate ways; Jack and Leo are recruited to the CIA by Frank "The Wizard" Wisner, and Yevgeny goes home to Moscow, where he is recruited into the KGB by the spymaster Starik while he falls in love with Azalia Ivanova.

In 1955, Jack has been assigned to Harvey "The Sorcerer" Torriti at a CIA station in East Berlin, where the Soviet defector Vitaly Vishnevsky offers the identity of a mole in MI6 for safe passage to the West. At the CIA headquarters in Washington, counterintelligence chief James Jesus "Mother" Angleton begins Vishnevsky's exfiltration and tells his best friend and MI6 liaison, Adrian Philby. When the KGB and Berlin Police show up to the exfiltration instead of Vishnevsky, Torriti and Jack surmise that the blown defection is because of the mole.

Angleton believes the fault lies with Berlin and infuriates Torriti, who aims to expose the mole by feeding him a barium meal: Torriti gives privileged information to a trusted contact in MI6, forcing the mole to protect himself by attempting to kill Torriti. Meanwhile, Jack is falling in love with his first asset, Lili, who provides information from an important scientist. When the barium meal sees Jack and Torriti ambushed at a meeting, Torriti prepares another.

In Washington, Leo has become Wisner's apprentice despite Angleton's misgivings. Leo has fallen in love with Adele Sweet, whose father is friends with President Eisenhower. When Leo proposes, her father disapproves of the "mixed marriage" but eventually relents. Yevgeny arrives in Washington and manages to tell Azalia that he is in the United States, where he deciphers elaborate Moscow Radio codes at night and delivers liquor during the day, including to the mole: Philby. Torriti flies home to tell Angleton and CIA director Allen Dulles that his MI6 source confirms Philby is the mole, but Angleton discredits Torriti.

In Berlin, discrepancies are found in Lili's information. When confronted by Jack, she admits she was turned by the KGB but assures Jack that she loves him. Shortly thereafter, the KGB murders the scientist, and Lili commits suicide. In Washington, Yevgeny tells Philby to run before he is caught and assures him that another mole, Sasha, has already taken his place. Jack is unsure if Torriti used Lili for his final barium meal, and Angleton is devastated that his best friend was a mole.

In 1956, Jack is sent to Budapest on the eve of the Hungarian Revolution, but he is abducted and tortured at an AVH prison. Torriti threatens his KGB counterpart in Berlin and demands that the AVH release Jack, but Jack is rescued by the revolutionaries, who execute an AVH commandant as he tries to reveal Sasha's identity. Jack asks the CIA to back the freedom fighters, but Eisenhower refuses and the revolution is crushed. Jack escapes and reconnects with Torriti, Wisner has a breakdown over his complicity in the CIA's actions, and Starik tells Nikita Khrushchev of "Kholstomer", his long-term masterstroke to cripple the US economy. Yevgeny continues his work and tries to call Azalia, but his handlers are unable to find her.

In 1960, Jack joins Cuban rebels to help prepare them for an invasion since they believe that the Kennedy administration will support them. In Washington, Torriti devises a scheme to have the Mafia assassinate Fidel Castro; Chicago mob boss Johnny Rosselli suggests poisoning one of Castro's daily milkshakes. The assassin is intercepted by the head of Castro's secret police, Manuel Piñeiro, and forced to drink the milkshake. In Washington, Yevgeny is nearly arrested by the FBI and is forced to relocate. As the CIA prepares the Cuban invasion, Angleton predicts that Sasha will ensure its failure. Bissell, the architect of the invasion and Leo's new boss, scoffs at the notion, but the Bay of Pigs Invasion is a disaster, and Jack barely escapes with his life. Angry that the CIA and the President let the rebels down, Jack nearly resigns, but Leo, who now has a son with Adele, talks him out of it. Jack is awarded a Distinguished Intelligence Medal.

In 1975, Leo is on vacation with his family, Yevgeny visits his dying father along with a disillusioned Philby in Russia, and Jack is working to exfiltrate Kukushkin, who promises information on Sasha. Angleton feels that Kukushkin may be legitimate, but his obsession with Sasha and Soviet infiltration into the CIA has begun to cripple the Company. Using information gathered over decades, including Kukushkin's new data and clues from the liquor store where Yevgeny was nearly caught, Angleton divines a system of masterful rhetoric to reveal the mole: Leo.

Angleton has Leo kidnapped, interred, and systematically interrogated about his socialist father. Jack cannot believe his best friend may be responsible for Lili, Hungary, and the Bay of Pigs. When Jack visits him, Leo proclaims his innocence and suggests that Kukushkin must be a disinformation agent dispatched by the KGB. Mirroring Leo's prediction, Kukushkin returns to the Soviet Union, where he is allegedly shot as a traitor. When Kukushkin turns up alive, CIA Director Colby exonerates Leo, but Angleton furiously insists that Starik manipulated the Kukushkin defection so that the CIA would believe Leo is innocent. Leo is freed and Angleton is forced to resign, berating his superiors that the KGB's wilderness of mirrors has falsely convinced them they are winning the Cold War.

In 1987, Torriti has retired, and Adele has committed suicide. Analysts present Jack with an old lead linking a 1950s Moscow Radio broadcast to KGB operatives and so Jack enlists the help of a dying Angleton, who surmises that the broadcast is part of Kholstomer. After a sting, Jack comes face to face with Yevgeny, who made liquor deliveries not only to Philby but also to Leo. When Jack confronts Leo with that information at his home, Leo shoots him, admitting that he joined the KGB in college and that Adele killed herself when she found out before phoning an ambulance for Jack and fleeing. While Jack recovers, Kholstomer leads to the 1987 stock market crash. The CIA's foreknowledge helps mitigate the damage, but the plan's biggest failure results from Starik underestimating the strength of the US economy.

In 1991, Jack offers Yevgeny an early release from prison if he reveals Leo's location by telling him that Starik sent Azalia to the gulag, but he still has time to find her since the Soviet Union is collapsing. Yevgeny tracks down Leo and warns him before passing his whereabouts to Jack. Yevgeny visits with a ruined and senile Starik and finally reconnects with Azalia. Jack travels to Moscow to kill Leo but stops himself moments before Leo recognizes him. Back in DC, Torriti and Jack reminisce over their work in the Cold War, with Jack expressing misgivings over which side was good or bad. Torriti insists the CIA were the good guys, concluding with the phrase "we won, didn't we?"

== Cast ==
- Chris O'Donnell as Jack McAuliffe
- Michael Keaton as James Jesus Angleton / "Mother"
- Alfred Molina as Harvey Torriti / "The Sorcerer"
- Tom Hollander as Kim Philby
- Rory Cochrane as Yevgeny Tsipin
- Alessandro Nivola as Leo Kritzky
- Ulrich Thomsen as Starik Zhilov
- Natascha McElhone as Elizabet Nemeth
- Alexandra Maria Lara as Lili / Helga
- Ted Atherton as Frank Wisner / "The Wizard"
- Cedric Smith as DCI Allen Dulles
- Rick Roberts as DCI William Colby
- Simon Callow as MI6 liaison officer Elihu
- Antony Sher as Ezra ben Ezra, the Mossad-CIA liaison / "The Rabbi"
- Mišel Matičević as Arpad Zelk, the Hungarian poet
- Joe Lisi as Sam Giancana
- Chuck Shamata as Johnny Roselli

== Similarities to real life ==
The Soviet spy Tsipin uses the code word "Alice in Wonderland", from the book by Lewis Carroll. Tsipin uses the aliases Eugene "Dodgson" and Gene "Lutwidge". Lewis Carroll's real name is Charles Lutwidge Dodgson. Tsipin's superior, "Starik" the KGB general, takes posed photos of young girls as a hobby, just like Dodgson.

The DVD set came with two disks. The second disk had a "Covert Mission," to be completed by placing the disk in a computer's DVD drive "to receive instructions to complete your mission." After searching the different directories, the player could find a folder "PC_Clickme," which linked to a website, www.thecompanyspygame.com. The domain was abandoned in 2011.

== Filming ==
- Summer-Fall 2006: filming in Toronto and Hamilton, Ontario, Canada.
- Fall-Winter 2006: filming in central Budapest, District VIII.
- Spring 2007: filming in Añasco, Puerto Rico.

== Reception ==
On the review aggregator website Rotten Tomatoes, 73% of 22 critics' reviews are positive. The website's consensus reads: "Overly ambitious to be sure, The Company nevertheless delivers an evocative Cold War tale with top-notch performances and an engrossing sense of intrigue."

== Home media ==
The Company was released on 23 October 2007 on both high-definition Blu-ray Disc and standard-definition DVD.
