= James Jesus Angleton =

Central Intelligence Agency officer (1917–1987)

James Angleton
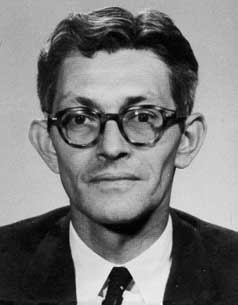
- Angleton c. 1960
- Born: James Jesus Angleton; December 9, 1917; Boise, Idaho, U.S.
- Died: May 11, 1987 (aged 69); Washington, D.C., U.S.
- Education: Yale University (BA); Harvard University (attended)
- Spouse: Cicely d'Autremont (m. 1943)
- Children: 3
- Awards: Distinguished Intelligence Medal
- Espionage activity
- Allegiance: United States
- Service branch: Central Intelligence Agency; United States Army
- Service years: 1943–1947 (U.S. Army); 1947–1975 (CIA)
- Rank: Counterintelligence (CI) Chief (1954–1975)
- Operations: Operation CHAOS

James Jesus Angleton (December 9, 1917 – May 11, 1987) was an American Central Intelligence Agency (CIA) officer who served as chief of the counterintelligence department of the CIA from 1954 to 1975. According to the director of central intelligence, Richard Helms, Angleton was "recognized as the dominant counterintelligence figure in the non-communist world".

Angleton, who had an academic background in literary criticism, served in the Office of Strategic Services at London and Rome between 1943 and 1946, where he rapidly rose through the ranks. In 1947, he returned to Washington, D.C. to become one of the founding officers of the CIA. He was initially responsible for the collection of foreign intelligence and liaison with counterpart organizations in allied countries.

In 1954, Allen Dulles promoted Angleton to chief of the Counterintelligence Staff. As chief, Angleton was significantly involved in the defection of Soviet KGB agents Anatoliy Golitsyn and Yuri Nosenko. Through Golitsyn, Angleton became convinced the CIA harbored a high-ranking Soviet mole and engaged in an intensive search. Whether this was a highly destructive witch hunt or appropriate caution remains a subject of intense historical debate.

Investigative journalist Edward Jay Epstein agrees with the high regard in which Angleton was held by his colleagues in the intelligence business, and adds that Angleton earned the "trust of six CIA directors—including Gen. Walter Bedell Smith, Allen W. Dulles and Richard Helms. They kept Angleton in key positions and valued his work."

== Early life and education ==
James Jesus Angleton, nicknamed "Jim", was born December 9, 1917, in Boise, Idaho, the eldest of four children of James Hugh Angleton (1888–1973) and Carmen Mercedes Moreno (1898–1985). He had a brother, Hugh, and two sisters, Carmen and Dolores. His parents met in Nogales, Arizona, while his father was a United States Army cavalry officer serving under General John Pershing.

Carmen Moreno was born in Mexico, but was already a naturalized American citizen before she married James H. Angleton in December 1916. Angleton was raised speaking his mother's native Spanish, and later learned Italian, German, and French.

The Angletons left Boise in 1925. James Hugh Angleton joined the National Cash Register Corporation, rising through its ranks until 1933, when he purchased the NCR franchise in Italy. In Italy, he became head of the American Chamber of Commerce, was a friend of Ambassador William Phillips, and was kept abreast of Italian politics through his membership in the Masonic Order. Despite holding "ultra-conservative" views, according to OSS officer Max Corvo, James Hugh informed the State Department on fascist activities, and later returned to the US and worked for the OSS during the Second World War. Because of his father's work, Angleton's boyhood was spent in Milan, Italy. He studied as a boarder at Malvern College in England from 1933 to 1936 before enrolling at Yale University.

=== Yale ===
Angleton entered Yale in 1937. He quickly took an interest in poetry and literary criticism, and delved into the young field of New Criticism under the tutelage of Maynard Mack and Norman Holmes Pearson, a founder of American studies. His study of New Criticism was inspired by William Empson, the author of Seven Types of Ambiguity, whom he successfully invited to lecture at Yale and lobbied to have appointed to the faculty.

In early 1939, he became the inaugural editor-in-chief of Vif, a magazine dedicated to French poetry and prose and staffed by students from Yale, Vassar, and Mount Holyoke. A few months later, Angleton and his friend Reed Whittemore founded a new "little magazine" of poetry, Furioso. Furioso published many of the best-known poets of the interwar period, including William Carlos Williams, E. E. Cummings, Marianne Moore, and Ezra Pound. The magazine was well-received, attracting the attention of notables including Archibald MacLeish and occasionally being sent abroad for readers in Europe. At Yale, Angleton was also a skilled soccer player and golfer.

In connection with his work at Furioso, Angleton carried on correspondences and friendships with Pound, Cummings and T. S. Eliot, among others, some of which continued long after his departure from Yale. With help from his father, Angleton managed to visit Pound at his home in Rapallo in 1937, and the Angletons became benefactors of Pound, supporting his 1939 trip to the United States. In his correspondence with Pound, Angleton suggested that he was against war and "the foreign bank influence in the U.S." Furioso would continue to be published privately by Whittemore until 1953, and was revived by him as Carleton Miscellany from 1960 until 1980.

Despite his intellectual activities, Angleton graduated from Yale in the bottom quarter of his class, having little time for subjects other than poetry, Italian, and literary criticism. His thesis concerned the poetic work of T.S. Eliot. After his first application to study at Harvard Law School was rejected, he was admitted in 1941 on the recommendation of Pearson, but did not graduate. Before he left, he met his wife, Cicely d'Autremont. As the Second World War took its course, Angleton provided information about Pound beginning in 1943, providing photographic portraits he had taken of Pound to the FBI and Army which were used to identify him after the invasion of Italy.

== World War II and Italy ==
=== London ===
On March 19, 1943, Angleton enlisted in the U.S. Army. He was initially assigned to the 711th MP Battalion, but after a few months, he was transferred to Washington, DC to work at the Office of Strategic Services (OSS), probably by his former professor and (by then) confidante Norman Holmes Pearson, who worked for the organization. He arrived in London in September 1943, affiliated with the OSS's X-2 Counter Espionage Branch.

While he initially processed FBI information forwarded to London (including about his erstwhile friend Pound) as a technician fifth grade, Angleton's self-confidence and competence resulted in a rapid chain of promotions. By February 1944, he was chief of the Italy desk for X-2 in London. While in London, Angleton befriended Kim Philby, his liaison contact with MI6. By one account, Philby became Angleton's "prime tutor in counterintelligence" during his time in London.

=== Rome ===
In August 1944, Angleton arrived in Rome as the commander of SCI-Unit Z, making him the only American in Italy empowered to read top secret ULTRA information. By March 1945, he was the head of X-2 for the entirety of Italy, and had cultivated an extensive network. The most urgent task of X-2 in 1944 and 1945 was neutralizing the extensive network of German agents and informants left behind by Sicherheitsdienst, a task he went about with great skill, which relieved and impressed his superiors. Angleton's effectiveness was in spite of his character, which was criticized as arrogant and imperious by some officers.

Soon after assuming command in Rome, Angleton reactivated the OSS Maritime Unit in Italy, which had been suspended due to security concerns. Angleton attempted to neutralize the stay-behind network of the SS-collaborating Decima Flottiglia MAS, which resulted in commander Junio Valerio Borghese's defection to the OSS. Angleton personally drove Borghese from Milan to Rome for interrogation, where he provided a wealth of useful information until the Italian government forced his transfer to Italian custody in the fall 1945. Due to its use of British ULTRA information, X-2 was in practice, subordinate to British intelligence aims by the end of the war. Between January and April 1945, Angleton skillfully distilled ULTRA intelligence and intelligence won from interrogations to develop a "Key" for understanding German and Italian espionage tactics for officers not permitted to view ULTRA information.

==== Post-war activities ====
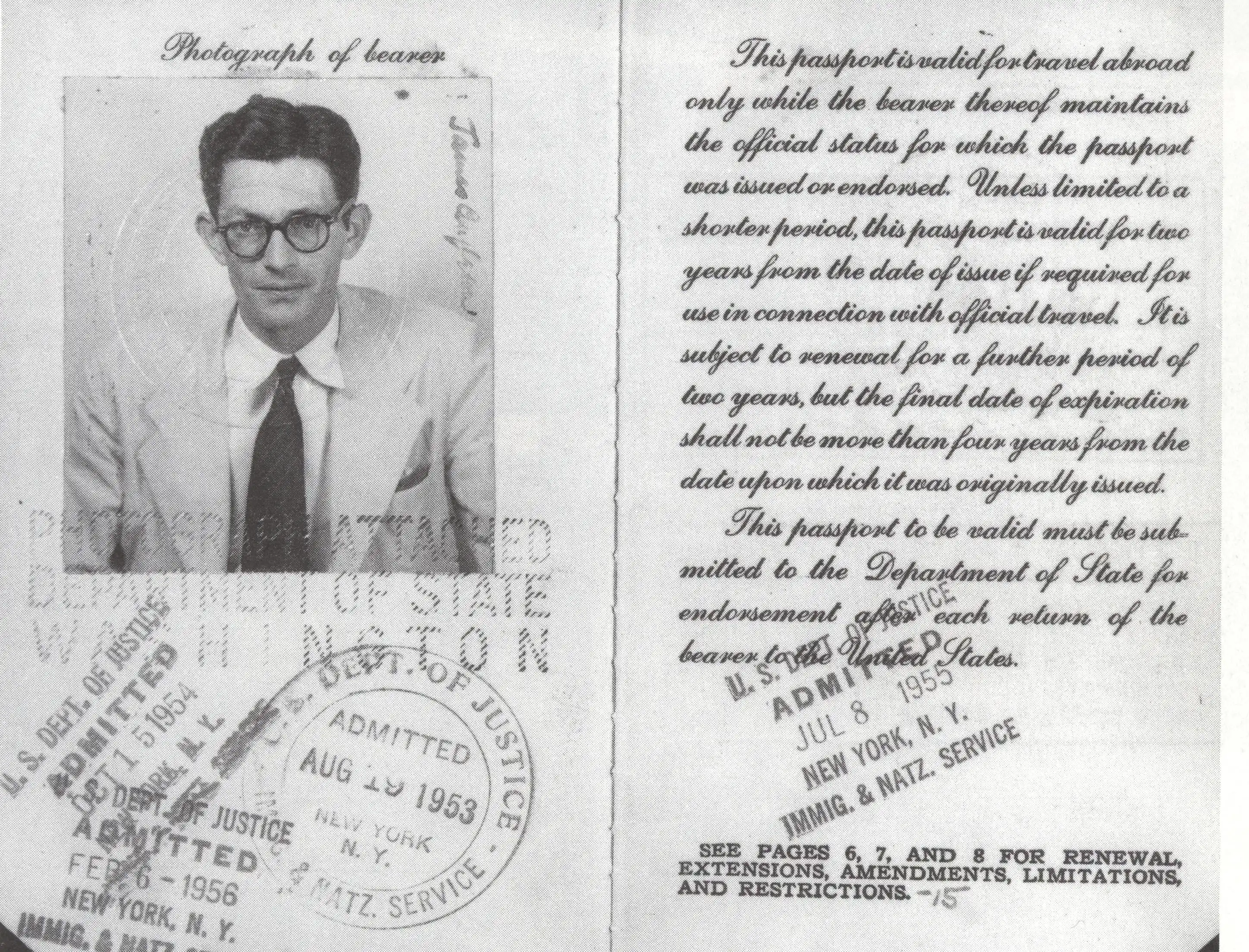
Angleton's passport, c. 1953

Upon the end of the war, Angleton was reassigned to 2677 Regiment, where his duties pivoted from providing military security to undertaking "long-range counterespionage" aimed at drawing information out of foreign intelligence services. Angleton used information generated by his father (who represented X-2 in negotiations with Pietro Badoglio and leaders within the SIM in 1943 and 1944) to deepen collaboration with all of Italy's five major intelligence services.

By the end of 1946, Angleton and his subordinates had amassed a network of over 50 informants within seven foreign intelligence services, including the Yugoslavian OZNA, French SDECE, and Italian SIS. Angleton's liaisons within the reestablished Italian services were affordable and effective: X-2 leadership deemed the network the "most spectacularly productive" of any of X-2 's operations. Several of his Italian contacts rose to high positions; allegedly, Angleton used his Italian network to conduct "nebulous interference" with the Pound-Rudge family "for over forty years".

Angleton maintained a particularly productive relationship with a republican ideological agent in the highly monarchist Italian Royal Navy, through which he gained advance knowledge of Soviet penetration in the Italian military and intelligence services. A less successful venture involved a dispute with the OSS's Secret Intelligence Branch regarding Vatican intelligence which was later revealed to be fabricated.

After the war's end, X-2 began to assert itself against the British, whose access to ULTRA information initially restricted Angleton's range. It worked to undermine pro-monarchist British influence in favor of republican factions, and supported non-communist centrist parties, especially the Christian Democratic Party. After his departure from the country, Angleton retained a keen interest in Italian affairs, taking a leading role in the CIA's influence operations during the 1948 general election, where the Christian Democrats triumphed over the Soviet-friendly Popular Democratic Front.

== Central Intelligence Agency ==
Upon his return to Washington after World War II, Angleton was employed by the various successor organizations to the OSS and eventually became one of the founding officers of the Central Intelligence Agency in 1947.In May 1949, he was made head of Staff A of the Office of Special Operations, where he was responsible for the collection of foreign intelligence and liaising with counterpart intelligence organizations in foreign countries.

Beginning in 1951, Angleton was responsible for "the Israel desk" as liaison with Israel's Mossad and Shin Bet agencies. Angleton retained an active interest in Israeli intelligence and maintained his connections throughout his career, believing that émigrés to Israel from the Soviet Union and Warsaw Pact nations could be a valuable source of information on their countries of origin. He also believed that Israeli foreign intelligence services could be used for proxy operations in third countries. For instance, Shin Bet was crucial in obtaining a transcript of Nikita Khrushchev's 1956 speech to the Communist Party of the Soviet Union Congress that denounced Joseph Stalin. Author Samuel Katz has claimed that Angleton directed CIA assistance to the Israeli nuclear weapons program.

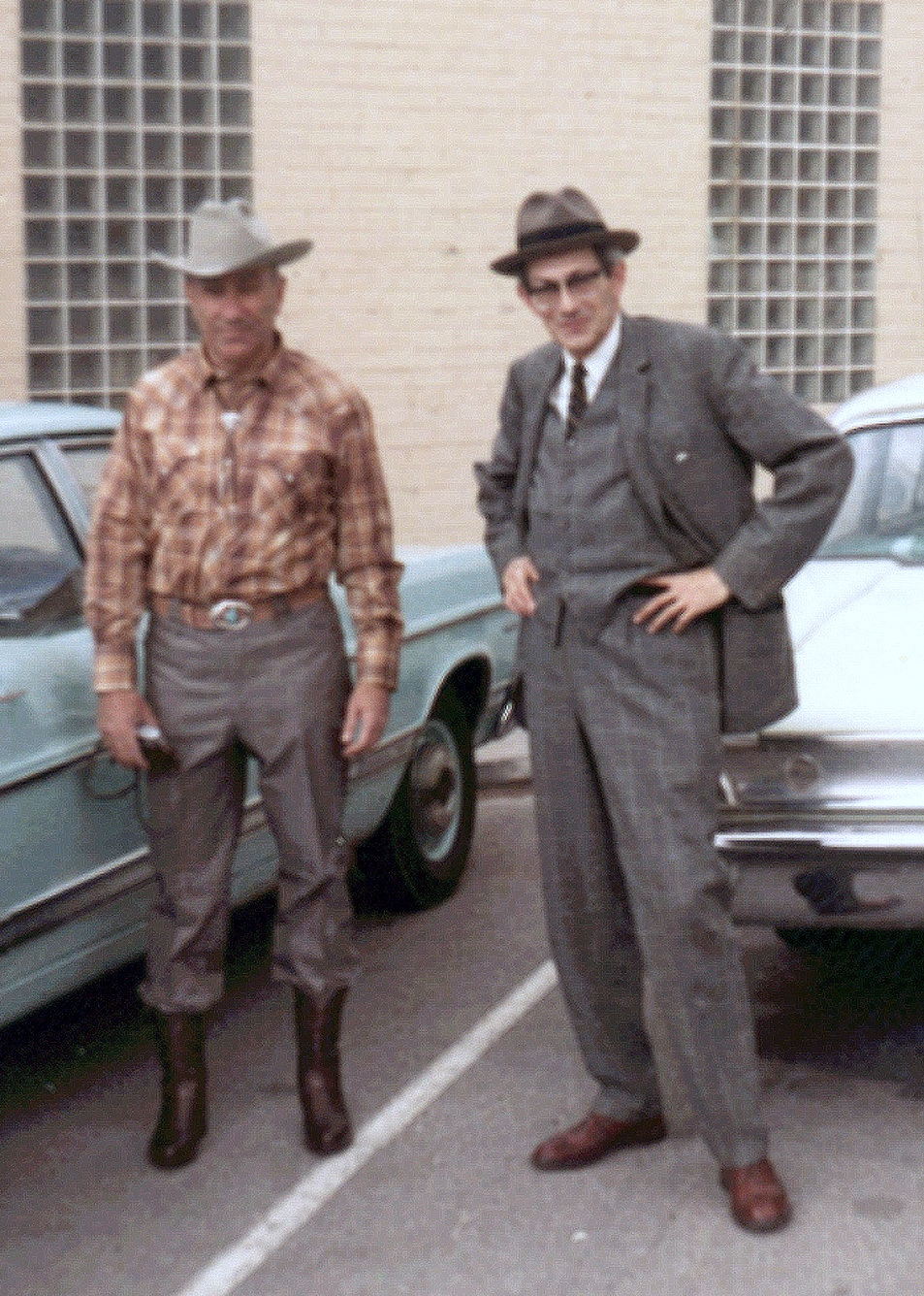
Angleton (right) with head of Mossad Global Operations Meir Amit (1966).

As head of Staff A, Angleton worked particularly closely with Kim Philby, the apparent future head of MI6, who was also in Washington. The Israeli intelligence officer Teddy Kollek claimed years later that in 1950 he warned Angleton that Philby had been a Soviet agent in the 30s.

In 1951, Philby's colleagues Guy Burgess and Donald Maclean defected to Moscow. Philby was expelled from Washington, suspected of having tipped them off, based on decoded Soviet communications from the Venona project. Philby was confirmed to be a Soviet mole, but eluded those sent to arrest him. He defected to Moscow in 1963. Philby called Angleton "a brilliant opponent" and a "fascinating" friend who seemed to be "catching on" before his defection. CIA employee William King Harvey, a former FBI agent, had voiced his suspicions regarding Philby and others that Angleton suspected were Soviet agents.

In 1953, Allen Dulles became Director of Central Intelligence. He soon named Angleton chief of the Counterintelligence Staff, in which position Angleton served for the remainder of his career.

As chief of Counterintelligence, Angleton oversaw a ring of informants organized by Jay Lovestone, a trade union leader and former head of the Communist Party of the United States. It was informally called the "Lovestone Empire". Lovestone worked with foreign unions and used covert funds to establish a global system of anti-communist union organizers. In 1964 he served as the CIA's liaison to the Warren Commission, handling commission requests. At the suggestion of Angleton and others, Yuri Nosenko was not permitted to testify before the commission. Nosenko stated that Lee Harvey Oswald was of little interest to the KGB. However Angleton suspected that Nosenko was a triple agent.

During the Vietnam War and Soviet-American détente, Angleton remained convinced of the necessity of the war. During this period, Angleton's counter-intelligence staff undertook a most comprehensive domestic covert surveillance project (called Operation CHAOS) under the direction of President Lyndon Johnson. The prevailing belief at the time was that the anti-war and civil rights movements of the 1960s and 1970s had foreign funding and support. Although the Soviet Union did influence the movements, no evidence was found by them.

Angleton also believed that the strategic calculations underlying the resumption of relations with China were flawed based on a deceptive KGB staging of the Sino-Soviet split. He even went so far as to speculate that Henry Kissinger might be under KGB influence.

=== Suspicion of infiltration ===
Angleton's view was influenced by his direct experience with the manipulation of German intelligence during World War II, the Cambridge Five, and the success of American infiltration efforts in the Third World. In particular, Angleton's close association with Philby heightened Angleton's suspicions and led him to double-check "potential problems". Angleton's position in the CIA and his close relationship with Director Richard Helms expanded his influence, and as it grew, the CIA split between Angletonians and anti-Angletonians. This conflict rose in particular regard to Anatoliy Golitsyn and Yuri Nosenko, who defected from the Soviet Union to the United States in 1961 and 1964, respectively.

Golitsyn defected via Helsinki on December 15, 1961. He and his family flew with a CIA escort to Sweden and then to the United States, where he was interviewed by Angleton personally. Golitsyn limited his initial debriefing to a review of photographs to identify KGB officers and refused to discuss KGB strategy. After Golitsyn raised the possibility of serious infiltration within MI5 in a subsequent debriefing, MI5 shared the concern with Angleton. He responded by asking Helms to allow him to take responsibility for Golitsyn and his further debriefing. Golitsyn ultimately informed on many famous Soviet agents, including the Cambridge Five, which led to their apprehension. Angleton identified Golitsyn as "the most valuable defector ever to reach the West".

However, other allegations Golitsyn made, including that Prime Minister of the United Kingdom Harold Wilson was a Soviet agent and that the Sino-Soviet split was a "charade," were ultimately found to be false. Golitsyn also claimed that a mole had been stationed in West Germany, was of Slavic descent, had a last name that might end in "sky," definitely began with a "K", and operated under the KGB codename "Sasha". Angleton believed this claim, with the result that anyone who approximated this description, fell under suspicion.

Angleton became increasingly convinced that the CIA was compromised by the KGB. Golitsyn convinced Angleton that the KGB had reorganized in 1958 and 1959 to consist mostly of a shell, incorporating only those agents whom the CIA and the FBI were recruiting, directed by a small cabal of puppet masters who doubled those agents to manipulate their Western counterparts. Although Golitsyn was a questionable source, Angleton accepted significant information obtained from his debriefing by the CIA.

In 1964, Yuri Nosenko, a KGB officer based in Geneva, insisted he needed to defect to the United States because his role as a double agent had been discovered, and he was being recalled to Moscow. Nosenko was allowed to defect, although the CIA was unable to verify a KGB recall order. Golitsyn had said from the beginning, that the KGB would try to plant defectors in an effort to discredit him. Under great duress, Nosenko failed two highly questionable lie detector tests, but passed a third test monitored by several Agency departments.

Judging his claim (as well as additional claims regarding Lee Harvey Oswald) to be improbable, Angleton permitted David Murphy, head of the Soviet Russia Division, to hold Nosenko in solitary confinement for over three years. This confinement included 16 months in a small attic with no windows, furniture, heat or air conditioning. Human contact was completely banned. Nosenko was given a shower once a week and had no television, reading material, radio, exercise, or toothbrush. Interrogations were frequent and intensive. Nosenko spent an additional four months in a ten-foot by ten-foot concrete bunker in Camp Peary. He was told that this condition would continue for 25 years unless he confessed to being a Soviet spy.

Nosenko did not appear to have shaken Angleton's faith in Golitsyn, although Helms and J. Edgar Hoover thought otherwise. Hoover's objections are said to have been so vehement as to severely curtail counterintelligence cooperation between the FBI and CIA for the remainder of Hoover's service as FBI director. Nosenko was found to be a legitimate defector, a lieutenant colonel. He became a consultant to the CIA. Golitsyn, who had defected years before, was unable to provide concrete support for his views of the KGB.

Angleton came into increasing conflict with the rest of the Agency, particularly the Directorate of Operations, over the efficacy of their intelligence-gathering efforts. He questioned this without explaining his broader views on KGB strategy and organization.

In his 2022 book, Uncovering Popov's Mole, researcher John M. Newman argues that Bruce Solie of the Office of Security was very probably the mole and that he misled Angleton, his protégé, into believing the traitor was in the Soviet Russia Division.

=== Suspicion of foreign leaders ===
Throughout the 1960s and 1970s, Angleton privately accused various foreign leaders of being Soviet spies. He twice informed the Royal Canadian Mounted Police that he believed Prime Minister Lester Pearson and his successor Pierre Trudeau were agents of the Soviet Union. Angleton accused Swedish Prime Minister Olof Palme, West German Chancellor Willy Brandt, and British Prime Minister Harold Wilson of being assets of the Soviet Union.

Australian journalist Brian Toohey claimed that Angleton considered Australian Prime Minister Gough Whitlam a "serious threat" to the US. Angleton was concerned after the Commonwealth police raided ASIO headquarters in Melbourne in 1973 at the direction of Attorney General Lionel Murphy. In 1974, Angleton sought to instigate the removal of Whitlam from office by having CIA station chief in Canberra, John Walker, ask Peter Barbour, then head of ASIO, to make a false declaration that Whitlam had lied about the raid in Parliament. Barbour refused to make the statement.

=== Church Committee and resignation ===
In 1973, William Colby was named Director of Central Intelligence by Richard Nixon. Colby reorganized the CIA in an effort to curb Angleton's influence and weaken the Counterintelligence branch, beginning by stripping him of control over the Israel desk. Colby demanded Angleton's resignation.

Angleton came to public attention when the Church Committee (formally the Senate Select Committee to Study Governmental Operations with Respect to Intelligence Activities) probed the CIA for information on domestic surveillance, specifically the operation known as HT Lingual, as well as assassination plots and the death of John F. Kennedy. Angleton was disgusted by the Church Committee, telling Loch K. Johnson that Frank Church's "innocence about the world exceeds that of an unborn child."

In December 1974, Seymour Hersh published a story in The New York Times about domestic counter-intelligence activities against anti-war protesters and other domestic dissidents. Angleton's resignation was announced on Christmas Eve 1974, just as President Gerald Ford demanded Director Colby report on the allegations and various congressional committees announced that they would launch their own inquiries.

Angleton told reporters from United Press International that he was resigning because "my usefulness has ended" and the CIA was getting involved in "police state activities". Three of Angleton's senior aides retired within a week after it was made clear that they would be transferred elsewhere in the Agency rather than promoted. The counterintelligence staff was reduced from 300 to 80 people.

In 1975, Angleton was awarded the CIA's Distinguished Intelligence Medal. By this time, Angleton had been quietly rehired by the CIA at his old salary through a secret contract. Until September 1975, "operational issues remained solely the preserve of Angleton".

=== Aftermath ===
The late 1970s were generally a period of upheaval for the CIA. During George H. W. Bush's tenure as Director, President Ford authorized the creation of Team B, a project concluding that the Agency and the intelligence community had seriously underestimated Soviet strategic nuclear strength in Central Europe. Admiral Stansfield Turner, on his appointment as DCI by President Jimmy Carter in 1977, used Angleton as an example of the excesses in the Agency that he hoped to curb. He referred to this during his service and in his memoirs.

Because of their suspicions, Angleton and his staff ultimately impeded the career advancement of numerous CIA employees. Forty employees are said to have been investigated and fourteen were considered serious suspects by Angleton's staff. The CIA paid compensation to three under what Agency employees termed the "Mole Relief Act".

With Golitsyn, Angleton continued to seek out moles. They sought the assistance of William F. Buckley, Jr. (himself a former CIA asset) to write New Lies for Old, which argued that the Soviet Union planned to fake a collapse to lull its enemies into a false sense of victory, but Buckley refused. In his 1994 book Wedge: The Secret War between the FBI and CIA, author Mark Riebling claimed that of 194 predictions made in New Lies For Old, 139 had been fulfilled by 1993, nine seemed "clearly wrong", and the other 46 were "not soon falsifiable".

Angleton was outraged by the anti-CIA backlash of the 1970s, and was the founding chairman of a pro-intelligence legal defense fund and lobbying organization, the Security and Intelligence Fund, in 1978. At the time of Angleton's death, the organization was called the Security and Intelligence Foundation.

== Personal life and death ==
Angleton met Cicely Harriet d'Autremont, a Vassar alumna from Tucson, Arizona and granddaughter of Chester Adgate Congdon, at Harvard in 1941. They married in Battle Creek, Michigan on 17 July 1943, shortly after he enlisted in the Army. Together, they had three children:

- James C. Angleton;
- Guru Sangat Kaur Khalsa (formerly Truffy Angleton); and
- Siri Hari Kaur Angleton-Khalsa (formerly Lucy d'Autremont Angleton)

The Angletons lived in the Rock Spring neighborhood of Arlington, Virginia until Angleton's death. The Angletons had a tumultuous marriage, nearly divorcing as early as 1946, and temporarily separating on several occasions thereafter, but nevertheless, stayed married and developed a varied social set in Washington, including professional acquaintances in intelligence, poets, painters and journalists. The Angletons maintained a friendship with E.E. Cummings and his wife, Marion, until the Cummings' deaths, and Angleton was a regular golf partner of James Laughlin. Angleton was a regular at the Army and Navy Club in Washington, and enjoyed taking rides down the Clara Barton Parkway in his Mercedes sedan. His sedan contained an "elaborate" sound system which he used to listen to opera.

Angleton's hobbies included orchid cultivation (he built a hothouse in his backyard, and developed a hybrid named after his wife), beekeeping, fly fishing, duck hunting, and gemology. The Angletons frequently summered at a Congdon family lodge on the banks of the Brule River in Wisconsin, and occasionally visited Glensheen in Duluth. Angleton continued to read and write poetry (being a regular at DC-area Joyce lectures) and was an amateur photographer, going back to his portraits of Pound.

The Angletons raised their children as Congregationalists, but Angleton's wife and his daughters later explored Sikhism. His elder daughter, Truffy, became a follower of Yogi Bhajan in the early 1970s, and introduced Bhajan's doctrines to her younger sister, Lucy; both women went on to take prominent roles in Bhajan's 3HO organization. According to his daughters, Angleton was religiously open-minded and met Yogi Bhajan.

Angleton, a heavy smoker, died of lung cancer in Washington, D.C. on 11 May 1987, aged 69. At his funeral, held at a United Church of Christ parish in Rock Spring, his lifelong friend Reed Whittemore read T.S. Eliot's "Gerontion". He is buried at Morris Hill Cemetery in Boise, about one hundred feet away from his longtime nemesis, Senator Frank Church.

Upon news of his death, the past and then-present heads of Mossad and Shin Bet secretly gathered to hold a tree-planting ceremony in honor of Angleton in a grove about ten miles west of Jerusalem's Old City. Angleton is also commemorated in Jerusalem with the "Jim Angleton Corner", an overlook point in Yemin Moshe.

== Legacy ==
Angleton's responsibilities as chief of Counterintelligence have given rise to a considerable literature focused on his efforts to identify Soviet or Eastern Bloc agents working in American secret intelligence agencies.

In time, Angleton's zeal and suspicions came to be regarded as counterproductive, if not destructive. In the wake of his departure, counterintelligence efforts were undertaken with far less enthusiasm. Some believe this overcompensation was responsible for oversights which allowed Aldrich Ames, Robert Hanssen and others to compromise American intelligence agencies after Angleton's resignation.

Although the American intelligence community quickly recovered from the Church Committee, it found itself uncharacteristically incapable of policing itself after Angleton's departure. Edward Jay Epstein has argued that the positions of Ames and Hanssen—both well-placed Soviet counter-intelligence agents, in the CIA and FBI respectively—enabled the KGB to deceive the American intelligence community, in the manner that Angleton hypothesized.

Despite misgivings over his uncompromising and often obsessive approach to his profession, Angleton is highly regarded by his peers in the intelligence business. Former Shin Bet chief Amos Manor, in an interview in Ha'aretz, revealed his fascination with the man during Angleton's work to forge the U.S.–Israel liaison in the early 1950s. Manor described Angleton as "fanatic about everything", with a "tendency towards mystification".

Manor discovered decades later that the real reason for Angleton's visit was to investigate Manor, being an Eastern European Jewish immigrant, for Angleton thought that it would be prudent to "sanitize" the U.S.–Israeli bridge before a more formal intelligence relationship was established.

Three books dealing with Angleton take foreign intelligence activities, counterintelligence, and domestic intelligence activities as their central theme: Tom Mangold's Cold Warrior, David C. Martin's Wilderness of Mirrors, and David Wise's Molehunt. Tim Weiner's Legacy of Ashes paint Angleton as an incompetent alcoholic, a view echoed by many other literary treatments of the man.

These views have been challenged by Tennent H. Bagley in his 2007 book, Spy Wars, and Mark Riebling in his 1994 book, Wedge. John M. Newman, in his 2022 book, Uncovering Popov's Mole, characterizes Angleton as a man lacking self-confidence and who required a father figure. Newman claims that Angleton was duped by at least two KGB moles: Kim Philby in MI6 and Bruce Solie in the Office of Security. Newman also suggests that Leonard V. McCoy in the Soviet Russia Division's Reports & Requirements section may have been a mole.

=== CIA Family Jewels ===
A set of highly sensitive Agency documents, referred to as the "Family Jewels," was publicly released on June 25, 2007, after more than three decades of secrecy. The release was prompted by an internal CIA investigation of the 1970s Church Committee which verified the far-ranging power and influence that Angleton wielded during his long tenure as counter-intelligence czar. The exposé revealed that Angleton-planned infiltration of law enforcement and military organizations in other countries was used to increase the influence of the United States. It also confirmed past rumors that it was Angleton who was in charge of the domestic spying activities of the CIA under Operation CHAOS.

=== 2025 JFK document release ===
Angleton's heavily-redacted testimony before the Senate Select Committee to Study Governmental Operations With Respect to Intelligence Activities in 1975 was finally released on March 18, 2025. The 50-year-old Top Secret report covers several topics, particularly clandestine, intelligence-sharing agreements with Israel, nuclear secrets, Yuri Nosenko, George Blake, signals intelligence, Anatoliy Golitsyn, the Warren Commission, and Lee Harvey Oswald. The 113-page fully unredacted document discloses several matters, including leaks to newsmen Seymour Hersh and Tad Szulc and their information about Watergate, Cuba, Project Azorian, and Sidney Gottlieb.

In the previously-redacted sections, the document is full of NBR markings from the Assassination Records Review Board, meaning Not Believed Relevant.

=== In popular culture ===
- The 2006 film The Good Shepherd is loosely based on Angleton's life and his role in the formation of the CIA.
- The Laundry Files by Charles Stross features a senior Laundry agent whose nom de guerre is James Angleton.
- The 2002 novel The Company by Robert Littell—and the 2007 television mini-series The Company based on it, with Angleton portrayed by Michael Keaton—is focused on Angleton's efforts to find a Soviet mole.
- Angleton was portrayed by John Light in the 2003 BBC TV mini-series Cambridge Spies.
- The song "Angleton" by Russian indie rock band Biting Elbows is about Angleton's life and career.
- In the television series Granite Flats the actor Cary Elwes plays Hugh Ashmead, the name "Ashmead" being the cover name for Angleton.
- William F. Buckley's 2000 novel Spytime: The Undoing of James Jesus Angleton is a fictionalized treatment of Angleton's career, a storyline being placed upon, between and within actual historic facts and events.
- Mike Doughty released a song entitled "James Jesus Angleton" on Apple Music in December 2017.
- The Fatima Mansions track "Brunceling's song" mentions Angleton by name, in a narrative involving spies adapting to regular life.
- In the 1991 Norman Mailer novel Harlot's Ghost, Tremont Montague (Harlot) is based on Angleton.
- The fourth season of the television series Le Bureau des Légendes introduces a character from the French external security service (DGSE) with the nickname of "JJA" - James Jesus Angleton. There is a short discussion of Angleton's career and its connection to this character.
- Angleton was portrayed by Stephen Kunken in the 2022 ITVX mini-series A Spy Among Friends about the defection of Kim Philby.
- In 2016, he was portrayed by Anthony Brophy in The Crown.
- In the HBO Max miniseries White House Plumbers, Angleton is portrayed by David Pasquesi.
- In season 2, episode 5 of the Netflix series The Recruit, the CIA's general counsel states that a CIA lawyer should "run the Angleton playbook."
- In 1976, Angleton was interviewed for the British television political programme, This Week, in which he gave a wide ranging opinion on his thoughts and conclusions of the ongoing Western fight against the Soviet Bloc.

== See also ==
- David Blee
- Aleksander Kopatzky
- Joseph McCarthy
- Martel affair
- Jim Skardon
- Spymaster
