= Aleksander Kopatzky =

Soviet double agent (1923–1982)

Aleksander Grigoryevich Kopatzky (Russian: Александр Григорьевич Копацкий; c. 1923–May 1982), a.k.a. Igor Orlov, was a Soviet-born intelligence officer and double agent who served the NKVD, Nazi Germany, the CIA, and the KGB at varying points in his career. He is thought to have been the elusive double-agent "Sasha".

Kopatzky's birth date, and other crucial personal information such as his birth name, is unknown. It has variously been given as January 1922 in Kiev, 1923 in Bryansk Oblast, or 1924 in Kiev. Kopatzky, as he was known when he entered CIA service, also used the names Aleksandr Navratilov and Calvus, and, in the U.S., Igor Orlov. His Soviet codenames were Erwin, Herbert and Richard.

In 1941, after the start of the German-Soviet War, Kopazky (nicknamed "Sasha") attended a training school for agents of the NKVD, being trained in partisan operations. In October 1943 he was parachuted into occupied Kresy to assist partisans, but the German Wehrmacht arrested him, and he was taken as a prisoner-of-war. From 1944, he ostensibly worked for the Germans as an agent of the Department of Foreign Armies against the Red Army in Vlasov’s Army. In 1945, he came into American captivity and came into contact with the Gehlen Organization and the Central Intelligence Group, into which he was recruited by 1948. He also became involved in an anti-Soviet émigré movement, the Struggle for the Liberation of the Peoples of Russia (SBONR). Posted to Berlin for the CIA, he played a role in identifying and recruiting potential agents. His role in recruiting agents has been variously characterized as low-level, mainly around recruiting prostitutes who might interact with Soviet officers, or extremely high-level: James Angleton alleged that he recruited agents to be sent into the Soviet Union.

In 1949, Kopazky was ostensibly re-recruited by the KGB and became one of its most important double agents. The CIA sent him to Berlin in 1951 under the name Franz Koischwitz. On 5 November 1951, he provided information which led to the kidnapping of Estonian CIA agent and SBONR colleague Vladimir Kivi from West Berlin to East Berlin by the KGB, which went unnoticed. In 1954 the CIA, which was planning on bringing Kopatzky to the U.S. for training, changed his name to Igor Orlov, allegedly to avoid negative attention upon his entry to the US due to a drunk driving charge in Germany. In 1957, Orlov, as he was by then known, attended agent training in the U.S. and was then reposted to Europe in 1958. In January 1960, he was transferred back to the US, as he had begun to be viewed as a security risk in Berlin. He was unable to find a new job at the CIA, rejected offers of compensation, and became a newspaper truck driver, eventually saving enough money to open an art gallery and frame shop in Alexandria, Virginia.

When KGB Senior Lieutenant Anatoliy Golitsyn defected to the U.S. in December of 1961, he told his handlers that he had read a report ten years earlier which led him to believe that the CIA was penetrated by a KGB mole whose code name was "Sasha," who had served with the CIA in Germany, and whose name started with a "K" and ended with a "-ski" or "-sky". This ignited an extensive molehunt which resulted in the firing of several CIA officers; while Orlov is today thought to be the real "Sasha", he was only uncovered in 1965, at which point he had been retired for five years. After authorities searched his house and shop in 1965, Orlov fled for a short time to the Soviet Embassy. However, he refused a flight to the Soviet Union, and subsequent FBI questioning turned up no evidence of his betrayal. After defections by Igor Kozlov (code-named KITTY HAWK) in 1966 and Vitaly Yurchenko in 1985, Orlov's case attracted renewed attention. However, he was never prosecuted.

He married Eleanore Rosa Stirner, the daughter of a former SS functionary, in 1947. They had two sons, George and Robert, who were questioned in connection with their father as late as 1988. Orlov died in May 1982; his wife blamed his death on continued investigations by the FBI and CIA.

John M. Newman alleges that Orlov was intentionally omitted from the "Sasha" search by Bruce Solie, a counterintelligence officer who Newman alleges was himself a KGB mole. From a "Sasha" list without Orlov/Kopatzky's name, Golitsyn chose the name Serge Karlow, probably because Karlow had been stationed in Germany, was already suspected of being a KGB agent in the Operation Easy Chair case, and was originally named Klibansky. Angleton, for his part, remained vehement that Orlov was "Sasha", but refused to end his molehunt after Orlov was uncovered, believing the KGB's infiltrations to be far deeper than just one man.

== See also ==
- List of Eastern Bloc defectors
- The Company (TV miniseries)
