= Service de documentation extérieure et de contre-espionnage =

Former French intelligence agency

Agency overview
- Formed: 1944
- Dissolved: 1982; 44 years ago
- Superseding agency: Directorate-General for External Security
- Headquarters: France

The Service de documentation extérieure et de contre-espionnage ("External Documentation and Counter-Espionage Service"), abbreviated SDECE (French: [zdɛk]), was France's external intelligence agency from 6 November 1944 to 2 April 1982, when it was replaced by the Directorate-General for External Security (DGSE). It should not be confused with the Deuxième Bureau which was intended to pursue purely military intelligence.

Under the Fourth Republic the SDECE was subordinated to the President of the Council. From the onset of the Fifth Republic and until 1962, it was subordinate to Prime Minister Michel Debré and its resources largely dedicated to the Algerian War. Following the Mehdi Ben Barka affair, General Charles de Gaulle subordinated the service to the Ministry of Defence, and the service was gradually militarized.

== History ==
The SDECE was founded in 1946 as a successor to the wartime Bureau Central de Renseignements et d'Action which was seen as too closely associated with the Gaullists to properly serve the republic. SDECE was known in France as la piscine (the swimming pool) because its HQ in Paris was located next to a public swimming pool. The SDECE was officially responsible to the Minister of Defense, but in fact reported to the president acting through a special adviser on intelligence matters. The SDECE was frequently involved in bureaucratic disputes with the Deuxième Bureau in Vietnam and Algeria, and within France with the Sûreté Générale, which led successive directors of the SDECE to see their real enemies as the other branches of the republic concerned with intelligence. As was usually the case with French intelligence, the division of responsibilities between rival agencies led to different arms of the French state to spend more time locked in bureaucratic disputes with one another than anything else. In September 1949, SDECE played a prominent role in the "scandal of the generals", when the Sûreté Générale revealed that the Army chief of staff had trusted confidential documents relating to the war in Vietnam to another general, who had given them to an SDECE agent who in turn had given them to the Vietminh. The French state tried to bury the story by ordering the newspapers not to print it, but the Paris correspondent of Time had reported to the New York office of Time. Unknown to him, the French state was illegally listening in to dispatches filed by foreign correspondents from Paris. The French embassy in Washington tried to suppress the story as embarrassing to France, but the U.S. government refused, citing the First Amendment, leading to the scandal of the Generals' affair as once the news broke in the United States, it was picked up by the French media.

In the 1950s, SDECE had a reputation for engaging in bizarre operations like stealing fuel from Soviet planes that had landed in France to analyze the antifreeze contents of Soviet jet fuel and for drugging Soviet espionage couriers on the Orient Express to rifle through the contents of their briefcases. The cryptographic division of the SDECE was well regarded, having broken several Soviet diplomatic codes, but its attempts at playing the role of a para-military organization was less successful. In 1951 SDECE created the Groupement de Commandos Mixtes Aéroportés para-military organization in Vietnam, part of the "Action Service" (together with 11th shock parachute regiment), to counter the Vietminh who were fighting for independence from France, but the general hostility of the Vietnamese to the French limited the appeal of fighting for France among the Vietnamese people. The SDECE parachuted agents both in Vietnam and Eastern Europe, but the SDECE was well penetrated by French communists who provided Moscow with all the details of the operations. In particular, the operations in Eastern Europe in 1950s were a complete disaster as every single agent parachuted into Eastern Europe was captured.

As in Vietnam, during the Algerian War, the SDECE played a prominent role in waging la guerre sale ("the dirty war") against the enemies of the republic. The 1950s-60s are remembered as the "era of political assassinations" by SDECE agents as one of the agency's main jobs was to assassinate members of the FLN. The number of killings dramatically stepped up in 1958 when Charles de Gaulle gave the SDECE's Action Service carte blanche to kill suspected members of the FLN under the cover of a pseudo-terrorist group called the Red Hand. The first two murders took place in West Germany, where an arms dealer who sold arms to the FLN was killed when the SDECE planted a bomb in his car while an anti-French Algerian politician was killed in a drive-by shooting. The fact that the various Länder police forces of West Germany were ineffective in investigating the "Red Hand" assassinations committed by SDECE was the result of a secret agreement with General Reinhard Gehlen, the chief of the Bundesnachrichtendienst under which the French and German intelligence were to share information in exchange for allowing the SDECE to commit murders on German soil. One SDECE agent, Philippe L. Thyraud de Vosjoli, wrote in his 1970 memoir Lamia: "Dozens of assassinations were carried out. Besides the use of guns or knives, more sophisticated methods had been perfected. Carbon dioxide guns ejecting small syringes had been purchased in the United States-but the SDECE people substituted the tranquilizing drug with a lethal poison. The victim showed all the symptoms of having suffered a heart attack". Besides for members of the FLN, the SDECE killed left-wing French intellectuals who supported the FLN, arms dealers and other anti-French nationalists in Africa. The SDECE also engaged in hijacking six ships bound for Algeria with arms for the FLN between 1956–61, and blew up one ship packed with weapons for the FLN in Hamburg harbor with a naval mine. Within Algeria itself, the SDECE assassinated suspected FLN members and provided intelligence to the Army to indicate "disloyal" villages that were to be burned down. Many of the assassins were pro-French Vietnamese who fled to France after Vietnamese independence, and were quite willing to kill and/or be killed for France. In 1960, many of the Action Service's killers, including most of the Vietnamese, went over the OAS, leading to the Action Service to dispatch new agents to Algeria to assassinate the former Action Service assassins who joined the OAS. In January 1961, the Action Service blew up the headquarters of the OAS's assassins. In 1960, de Gaulle founded the Service d'Action Civique (SAC), an organization linked to SDECE of about 8,000 that spied on his political opponents, broke up anti-Gaullist demonstrations and engaged in "dirty tricks" for the SDECE.

In December 1961, the SDECE was rocked by scandal of the Martel affair (also known as the Sapphire Affair) when a KGB defector, Anatoliy Golitsyn revealed to the CIA the existence of the Soviet Sapphire spy ring within the SDECE. President John F. Kennedy wrote a letter to President de Gaulle, detailing Golitsyn’s revelations, which was handed to de Gaulle personally by the CIA station chief in Paris. De Gaulle, however, believed the claim that the Sapphire spy ring existed was a CIA plot to disorganize the SDECE, and ordered the SDECE to break off all co-operation with the CIA. James Jesus Angleton, the CIA counterintelligence chief, seeing no French reaction to Golityn's information, ordered a "Black Bag job" (a break-in) at the French embassy in Washington to photograph the codebooks that were used to encrypt the Quai d'Orsay's radio messages, thereby allowing the Americans to know what the French were doing and to monitor the French reaction to Golitsyn’s revelations (the NSA apparently was not capable of breaking the Quai d'Orsay's codes in the 1960s). When it was discovered the CIA had broken into the French embassy to steal the French diplomatic codes, the SDECE station chief in Washington was recalled to Paris in disgrace. Despite de Gaulle's belief that the KGB Sapphire spy ring was CIA disinformation, it was later discovered that the Sapphire spy ring did in fact exist, and that Georges Pâques, the NATO press secretary, and André Labarthe (engineer), an aviation scientist, were both working for the KGB. Pâques was convicted of espionage for the Soviet Union, receiving life in prison, which was later reduced down to 20 years in prison. The Sapphire affair inspired the American novelist Leon Uris to write the 1967 novel Topaz about the Soviet penetration of the SDECE via the "Topaz" spy ring, which so closely resembled the Sapphire affair that many suspected the CIA leaked Uris information about the Sapphire case.

In October 1965, the SDECE was involved in another scandal when two SDECE agents kidnapped Mehdi Ben Barka, a left-wing Moroccan émigré, on the streets of Paris and handed him over to the agents of the Moroccan government to be tortured and killed. King Hassan II of Morocco, a close ally of France, had long been annoyed at Ben Barka's criticism of his regime and had asked General de Gaulle to extradite him back to Morocco, but as Ben Barka had been granted asylum in France and was breaking no laws, it was not legally possible to return Ben Barka to Morocco, leading to alternative means to be deployed. Ben Barka's body was never found, but as he was last seen alive in Paris being handed over by two SDECE agents to Moroccan agents on 29 October 1965, he is generally believed to have been murdered by the Moroccans. The revelation that the gangsters from le milieu (literally "the middle"; i.e French organized crime) had also involved in kidnapping Ben Barka further added to the scandal as many French people were shocked to discover that the SDECE often co-operated with le milieu. The Ben Barka affair briefly caused much public excitement as the SDECE had no powers of arrest, let alone to hand over a man who was legally living in France to be killed by the Moroccan state, but as the victim was a Moroccan Muslim, the public outrage soon subsided over L'affaire Ben Barka, and the scandal ended when the two SDECE agents who helped kidnap Ben Barka were convicted in 1967.

=== Quebec separatism ===
A major area of SDECE activity in the 1960s was supporting the Quebec separatist movement. Jacques Foccart, one of de Gaulle's most important aides directed the SDECE's operations against Canada, having SDECE fund Quebec separatists via the French consulates in Quebec City and Montreal. In 1968, the Canadian prime minister Pierre Trudeau handed the French ambassador a diplomatic note of protest against SDECE agents operating in Quebec and several SDECE agents in Canada posing as diplomats were declared persona non grata. De Gaulle had a deep, visceral hatred of Canada, which he viewed as a second-rate nation that from the French viewpoint had humiliatingly helped to save France, a would-be world power, in both world wars, and de Gaulle sought revenge by seeking to break up Canada. Furthermore, de Gaulle was an Anglophobe and as Canada was a product of the British Empire, this gave him an additional reason to hate Canada. A sign of how much de Gaulle hated Canada because of Canadian sacrifices during both world wars can be seen in that de Gaulle snubbed the remembrance ceremonies for the 20th anniversary of the Dieppe raid in 1962 and the 50th anniversary of Vimy Ridge in 1967 as he claimed he was too busy to attend; by contrast the Germanophile de Gaulle always found time for remembrance ceremonies involving German sacrifices in the world wars as Germany was a fellow would-be world power, meaning that German sacrifices to subjugate France were worthy of the respect and admiration of the French people in a way that Canadian sacrifices to liberate them were not. Marcel Cadieux, the undersecretary of state at the Canadian Ministry of External Affairs from 1964-1970, often wrote in his diary about de Gaulle's obsessive hatred of Canada and his willingness to break international law by meddling in the internal affairs of Canada. From 1963 onward, a major concern for the Royal Canadian Mounted Police (RCMP) was monitoring the SDECE agents who were supporting Quebec separatism by handing over bags of cash to separatists, and the RCMP viewed the French embassy in Ottawa much like the Soviet embassy; namely as a den of spies working for a hostile foreign power.

=== Nigerian Civil War ===
During the Nigerian Civil War of 1967-70, the SDECE supported Biafra by supplying the Biafrans with weapons and mercenaries as de Gaulle wanted to break up Nigeria and have oil-rich Biafra in the French sphere of influence. Furthermore, Nigeria, like Canada, was, also, a multi-cultural, multi-ethnic federation that was a product of the British Empire, giving de Gaulle another reason to want to see Nigeria broken up. The SDECE hired Bob Denard, a French mercenary who usually fought for France in Françafrique (France's sphere of influence in its former African colonies), and company to fight for Biafra. In the fall of 1968, the SDECE hired Rolf Steiner, a German mercenary who had once served in the French Foreign Legion, who together with 4,000 of his men left for Nigeria on a French ship from Lisbon to Libreville, Gabon, from where they were flown into Biafra on French planes. The SDECE often smuggled arms into Biafra on Red Cross planes that were supposed to be bringing food and medical supplies for the starving Ibos as the Federal Nigerian Army used starvation as a weapon to break Biafra.

=== Demise ===
In 1970, President Georges Pompidou appointed the Comte Alexandre de Marenches SDECE chief with orders to clean up the agency. Marenches described SDECE in 1970 as being more alike to an organized crime racket than an intelligence agency, writing: "Some agents were running drugs and guns; others were engaged in kidnapping, murder and the settling of the most bloody scores". Marenches severed the links with the SAC (which was finally dissolved in 1982 after the SAC murdered a police officer and his family in 1981), fired half of SDECE's 1,000 employees, made the SDECE more professional and less politicised, changed the focus from assassinating enemies of the republic to intelligence gathering, and modernized the procedures for intelligence collecting and analysis. Marenches is generally regarded as the most able of the SDECE directors, and the man who saved the agency from itself, turning what had been an thuggish outfit designed to murder enemies of the state into a more professional intelligence agency. Marenches also restored the ties to the CIA that de Gaulle had broken off, and in 1975 the SDECE worked with the CIA and the government of Zaire to support the National Liberation Front of Angola during the Angolan Civil War. At same time, the SDECE continued with its traditional work of ensuring that the countries in Françafrique stayed in the French sphere of influence. Ali Soilih, the president of the Comoros, had proven hostile to French influence after taking power in a 1975 coup, and in 1978 the SDECE hired Bob Denard to stage a coup. On the night of 13 May 1978, Denard and 42 other mercenaries landed on Grande Comore, almost effortlessly annihilated the Comorian forces and by the morning the Comoros was theirs. President Soilih was high on marijuana and naked in his bed together with three nude teenage schoolgirls watching a pornographic film, when Denard kicked in the door to his room to inform him that he was no longer president and had Soilih taken out to be "shot while trying to escape". In 1981, when the Socialist François Mitterrand became president, he fired Marenches whom he viewed as too conservative and appointed Pierre Marion, the former CEO of Air France as the new intelligence chief of what was renamed the Direction Générale de la Sécurité Extérieure (General Directorate of External Security) in 1982.

== Directors of the SDECE ==
- André Dewavrin alias "Colonel Passy", (DGER/SDECE), from 19 April 1945 to April 1946
- Henri-Alexis Ribiere, from April 1946 to January 1951
- Pierre Boursicot, from January 1951 to September 1957
- General Paul Grossin, from 1957 to 1962
- General Paul Jacquier (general), from 1962 to 1966
- General Eugène Guibaud, from 1966 to 1970
- Alexandre de Marenches, from 6 November 1970 to 12 June 1981
- Pierre Marion (SDECE/DGSE), from 17 June 1981 to 10 November 1982

== Known operations ==
- Guerrilla intelligence-gathering and operations with montagnard partisans during the First Indochina War carried out by the Groupe de Commandos Mixtes Aéroportés (GCMA).
- Operation Condor (1954), under Colonel Jean Sassi, directed against the Viet Minh at Dien Bien Phu.
- Operations interdicting the supply of weapons to the National Liberation Front (FLN) and its couriers in Europe (the « porteurs de valises », activists supporting Algerian independence) during the Algerian War.
- Supporting La Main Rouge in Algeria.
- Efforts to obtain control of Nigerian oil production in 1968 in association with Biafran separatists.
- Reporting the Yom Kippur War in October 1973 (it was the first Western intelligence service to do so).
- Reporting the Soviet invasion of Afghanistan in December 1979.
- Operation Caban (1979), a SDECE-directed coup d'état against Emperor Jean-Bédel Bokassa of the Central African Empire in 1979, aimed at installing a pro-French government.
- Efforts in 1977 and August 1980 to subvert colonel Muammar Gaddafi.
- Support of Québécois separatist movements by agents of the SDECE as part of operation « Assistance et cooperation technique » or « Opération Ascot».
- Assassination of Cameroonian Independence leader Félix-Roland Moumié in Geneva in 1960.
- According to Alfred McCoy's The Politics of Heroin in Southeast Asia (1972), the SDECE financed all of its covert operations during the Indochina War from its control of the Indochina drug trade (see also French Connection).

=== Possible operations ===
- Assassination of Ruben Um Nyobè
- Assassination of Barthélemy Boganda
- Assassination of Outel Bono
- Kidnapping of Mehdi Ben Barka
- Assisting a coup in Togo

== Known or supposed agents ==
- Jean-Charles Marchiani, with SDECE from 1960 to 1970
- Vladimir Volkoff, intelligence officer during the Algerian War
- Philippe Thyraud de Vosjoli
- Maurice Robert
- Colonel René Bertrand, alias Beaumont
- Colonel Pierre Fourcaud
- Colonel Marcel Leroy, alias Leroy-Finville
- Colonel Paul Ferrer, alias Fournier
- Colonel Marcel Mercier, part of the Red Hand terrorist group
- Lieutenant-Colonel Bernard Nut, chef de mission, killed on assignment February 15, 1983
- Major Boatham, alias Beaumont

== In popular culture ==
- The film le Professionnel.
- Frederick Forsyth's 1971 novel The Day of the Jackal, also very thoroughly describes the organization of SDECE.
- Netflix's 2016 original series A Very Secret Service (French: Au service de la France)
- René Mathis from the James Bond novel Casino Royale is an SDECE operative, as the book takes place in 1951 and he's described as being from France's intelligence agency. Later, in From Russia With Love, he is promoted to head of the SDECE.

== See also ==
- Civic Action Service
- Groupement de Commandos Mixtes Aéroportés
- 11e régiment parachutiste de choc
