= Georges Pâques =

French civil servant and spy (1914-1993)

Georges Pâques (29 January 1914 – 19 December 1993) was a French civil servant and spy. He began spying for the Soviet Union in 1944, and had a long, successful bureaucratic career in France. At the time of his arrest for espionage in 1963, he was the deputy head of NATO's press service.

Pâques was born in 1914 in Chalon-sur-Saône. He was admitted to the École normale supérieure in Paris in 1935, where he befriended Georges Pompidou and studied Italian. He taught in Nice from 1940 to 1941, but moved to Rabat after the allied landings in North Africa and he joined the forces of Henri Giraud. Thereafter, he fought in the French Resistance under the pseudonym of René Versailles. He was Chief of Staff at the Ministry of the Navy from 1944 to 1945, and later at the Ministry of State for Muslim Affairs. While working in Algiers in 1944, he was recruited into Soviet Service by Imek Bernstein, a mentor of Pâques and veteran of the International Brigades in Spain. After the end of the war, he worked in the ministries of Reconstruction and Urban Planning and Health. He also directed a journal, La Production française, from 1950 to 1954. After failing to win a seat in the National Assembly in 1951, he continued his bureaucratic work until 1958. The return of de Gaulle in May 1958 bettered Pâques's professional prospects, and he was able to join Louis Jacquinot's office in the Defense Staff's information service until July 1961, when he secured an appointment as director of the prestigious Institut des hautes études de défense nationale, which lasted until October 1962, when he joined the NATO press service at the recommendation of Georges Gorse.

Pâques was an extremely productive agent for the Soviets throughout his bureaucratic career in France and his employment at NATO. William T. Murphy identified him as one of the most valuable Soviet agents of the postwar era, exceeded only by Kim Philby and Klaus Fuchs. Aided by a top-secret security clearance and easy access to French ministers, he provided the Soviets with NATO war plans, force postures, and defensive strategies for West Germany, along with crucial French intelligence during the Cuban Missile Crisis and biographical writeups about NATO officials. Despite his brief tenure at NATO, an internal NATO document stated that Pâques had compromised “most of the essential elements” of NATO's defense strategies.

Throughout his professional career, Pâques was known as a sober, devout Catholic, albeit with a cynical streak. He was a professed conservative and anticommunist, and was in favor of the continued French presence in Algeria.

Pâques was arrested on 10 August 1963 in the wake of the Martel Affair. Although he had joined NATO after Anatoliy Golitsyn (a.k.a. Martel)'s defection, Golitsyn's allegations of deep infiltration within the French cabinet and military intelligence ignited the molehunt which resulted in Pâques's arrest.

At his trial in 1964, Pâques admitted his espionage activities, claiming that he did them in the service of world peace and against American hegemony, despite anti-Soviet scruples. A five-member jury convicted him in Paris and sentenced him to life imprisonment; he was freed and pardoned after seven years in prison by his old friend, now President, Georges Pompidou. After his release, he worked for an economic think-tank and died in 1993.
