= Sasha (espionage) =

Soviet alleged mole

Sasha was an alleged Soviet mole in the Central Intelligence Agency during the Cold War.

== Manhunt ==
In 1961, Anatoliy Golitsyn, a major in the KGB, was assigned to the embassy in Helsinki, Finland, under the name "Ivan Klimov." On 15 December, he defected to the US, along with his wife and daughter, by riding the train to the Swedish border. Golitsyn's defection so alarmed the KGB that orders were sent out to cancel all meetings with field agents out of fear that they would be identified.

Golitsyn was flown to the US and interviewed by David Murphy, the head of the CIA's Soviet Russia Division. After some time, Golitsyn began making increasing demands of the US and complaining about his treatment. Considering him to be unreliable, Murphy passed him on to James Jesus Angleton, the CIA's director of counterintelligence. Golitsyn's description of a traitor in the CIA, whom he knew only as "Sasha", led Angleton to embark on a multiyear manhunt that accused many members of the CIA of being the spy. The entire affair is still highly controversial.

In 1965, Alexander Kopatzky, a.k.a. Igor Orlov, was identified as the most probable "Sasha" candidate. Kopatzky, originally a Soviet agent who was captured by Nazi Germany in 1943, worked for the CIA in Berlin after the end of the war, left the CIA in 1960 and lived out the rest of his days in Alexandria, Virginia. The molehunt, however, continued after the discovery of Orlov.

== Reparations ==
Under United States Public Law 96-450, passed in 1980 and commonly known as the "Mole Relief Act", C.I.A. employees who have been accused unfairly of disloyalty (e.g. Sasha) and who have had their careers subsequently ruined were allowed to receive government compensation.

== List of accused CIA employees ==
This is a partial list of CIA employees accused of being Sasha. All were later cleared.

- Serge Karlow
- Richard Kovich
- Alexander ″Sasha″ Sogolow

Others CIA employees, though not suspected to be ″Sasha″, were suspected to be moles in the course of the Sasha molehunt:

- Paul Garbler
- George Goldberg
- David Murphy
- Vasia C. Gmirkin

== In popular culture ==
- In Robert Littell's novel The Company, the alleged existence of Sasha is an important element of the plot.

== See also ==
- Aleksander Kopatzky
