= Serge Karlow =

American CIA agent

Serge "Peter" Karlow (c. 1921 in New York, NY – November 3, 2005, in Montclair, New Jersey) was a CIA technical officer from 1947 to 1963 who was falsely accused of treason and forced to resign. The allegations against Karlow were made by KGB defector Anatoliy Golitsyn, who described a CIA officer of Slavic background who had bugged a building in Europe. Golitsyn said that he thought that the "Mole's" name began with a "K." In 1988, Director of Central Intelligence William Webster determined that the charges against Karlow had no merit. He was given an apology, medal and compensation.

Karlow served with distinction as a U.S. Navy intelligence officer in World War II, where he lost a leg in a mining explosion.

Karlow authored Targeted by the C.I.A.: An Intelligence Professional Speaks Out on the Scandal that Turned the C.I.A. Upside down.
