= Topaz (novel) =

Novel by Leon Uris

- First Edition (McGraw-Hill, 1967)
- Author: Leon Uris
- Language: English
- Publisher: McGraw-Hill
- Publication date: 1967
- LC Class: PZ4.U76 To

Topaz is a Cold War suspense novel by Leon Uris, published in 1967 by McGraw-Hill. The novel spent one week atop The New York Times Best Seller List (on the list dated October 15, 1967), and was Uris's first New York Times number-one bestseller since Exodus in 1959. During its 52-week run on the list, Topaz set two records in two weeks; those for largest positional jump to number-one (9–1) and largest positional fall from number-one (1–5).

== Overview ==
On the eve of the Cuban Missile Crisis, American and French intelligence agents are plunged into a maze of Cold War intrigue. In Paris, 1962, French intelligence chief André Devereaux and NATO intelligence chief Michael Nordstrom have uncovered Soviet plans to ship nuclear arms to Cuba. But when Devereaux reports his findings and nobody acts—and he is targeted in an assassination attempt—he soon realizes he is tangled up in a plot far greater than he realized. The two agents, along with a small band of Cuban exiles and Soviet defectors, chase leads around the globe in a quest to save NATO, themselves, and perhaps the world itself.

== Film adaptation ==
In 1969, Universal Pictures released Alfred Hitchcock's Topaz, based on the novel.

== Basis in fact ==
Uris said that events in Topaz are based to a limited degree on the Martel affair, which involved a Soviet defector, Anatoliy Golitsyn, who indicated there were deep KGB penetrations within the French establishment. This was taking place during the Cuban Missile Crisis, and the actions of one French agent in gathering information in Cuba became swept up in the events. The agent, Philippe Thyraud de Vosjoli, became friends with Uris. Then United States President John F. Kennedy felt obligated, based on both politics and national security, to order an investigation into the matter.

However, in 1968, French President Charles de Gaulle strongly denied that there was any basis in truth, saying the allegation that a Soviet spy had been a high-ranking official in France was "completely ridiculous and the highest absurdity."

In 1969, Thyraud de Vosjoli sued Uris for breach of contract, to get what he claimed were $450,000 in royalties, and the case went to trial in December 1971. On February 9, 1972, the court ruled Uris liable, and awarded the Plaintiff over $350,000 in damages. The total amount awarded was $352,350, for 1/2 of the royalties earned for Topaz, between the book and the film.
