= John Vassall =

British civil servant, spy for the USSR (1924–1996)

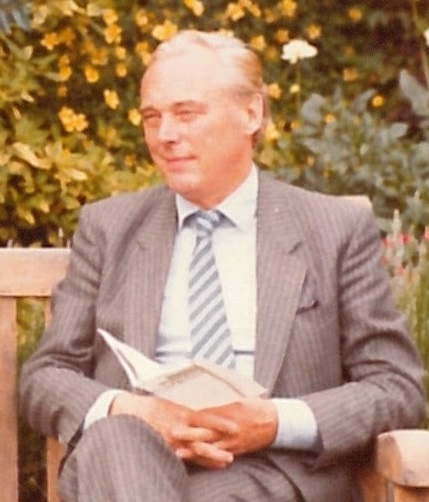
Vassall photographed in 1984

William John Christopher Vassall (20 September 1924 – 18 November 1996), known in later life as John Phillips, was a British civil servant who spied for the Soviet Union, allegedly under pressure of blackmail, from 1954 until his arrest in 1962. Although operating only at a junior level, he was able to provide details of naval technology which were crucial to the modernising of the Soviet Navy. He was sentenced to eighteen years' imprisonment, and was released in 1972, after having served ten. The Vassall scandal greatly embarrassed the Macmillan government, but was soon eclipsed by the more dramatic Profumo affair.

== Early life ==
Born in 1924, and known throughout his life as John, he was the son of William Vassall, chaplain at St Bartholomew's Hospital, London, and Mabel Andrea Sellicks, a nurse at the same hospital. He was educated at Monmouth School. During the Second World War, he worked as a photographer for the Royal Air Force. After the war, in 1948, he became a clerk (clerical officer) at the Admiralty.

Although his father was an Anglican priest, his mother converted to Roman Catholicism, a decision that led to tensions within their marriage. Vassall himself converted to Catholicism in 1953.

== Spying career ==
In 1952, Vassall was appointed, still as a clerical officer, to the staff of Geoffrey Bennett, the naval attaché at the British embassy in Moscow. There, he said later, he found himself socially isolated by the snobberies and class hierarchies of diplomatic life, his loneliness further exacerbated by his homosexuality, which was still illegal in both Britain and the Soviet Union. He became acquainted with a Pole named Sigmund Mikhailski, who worked for the Embassy, and who introduced him to the homosexual underworld of Moscow. In 1954, he was invited to a party, where he was encouraged to become extremely drunk, and where he was photographed in compromising positions with several men.

The party, arranged by the KGB, had been a classic "honeytrap". The Soviets used the photographs to blackmail Vassall into working for them as a spy, initially in the Moscow embassy, and later in London, following his return there in July 1956. He returned to the Admiralty, where he worked first in the Naval Intelligence Division, and then, as the clerical officer assistant to the Private Secretary, in the Private Office of Tam Galbraith, a Conservative Party politician and Civil Lord of the Admiralty. At the time of his arrest, he was working in Military Branch II. During his espionage career, Vassall provided the Soviets with several thousand classified documents, including information on British radar, torpedoes, and anti-submarine equipment. His obituary-writer in The Times commented that "Vassall was never more than a low-level functionary, but there was nothing low-level about the damage he was able to inflict". Similarly, Chapman Pincher regarded Vassall as "the classic example of the spy who, while of lowly rank, can inflict enormous damage because of the excellence of his access to secret information". Pincher continued: "I am in no doubt that the recruitment and running of Vassall was a major triumph for the KGB. He provided information of the highest value to the Soviet defence chiefs in their successful drive to expand and modernise the Red Navy."

== Exposure ==
Vassall was identified as a potential spy after Anatoliy Golitsyn, a senior member of the KGB, defected to the United States in 1961. The KGB, worried that Vassall would be exposed, ordered him to cease operations until further notice. Another defector, Yuri Nosenko, added to the case against Vassall, but doubts about the evidence provided by both Golitsyn and Nosenko persisted. Documents and microdots provided by the 1960 Polish defector Michal Goleniewski may also have contributed to the case against him. Vassall soon resumed his work. It had become obvious to his colleagues that Vassall had some other source of income, for he moved to an expensive flat in Dolphin Square, took foreign holidays, and was said to own 36 Savile Row suits. His annual expenditure was later estimated at £3,000, when his official salary was £750; he explained the discrepancy by stating that he had an inheritance from a distant relative.

On 12 September 1962, Vassall was arrested and charged with spying. He made a full confession, and directed detectives to the cameras and films concealed in his flat. The documents that he admitted to stealing did not account for everything believed to have been taken, however, which led to speculation that there was another spy still operating in the Admiralty. Some have suggested that Vassall was deliberately sacrificed by the KGB in an attempt to protect the other (possibly more senior) spy. In October, Vassall was sentenced to 18 years in jail. While in Wormwood Scrubs prison, Vassall became acquainted with neo-Nazi Colin Jordan who later wrote to Prime Minister Harold Macmillan claiming that, courtesy of Vassall, he had evidence of "a network of homosexual politicians". The Security Service MI5 interviewed both Vassall and Jordan and dismissed the claims.

The scandal caused the Macmillan government considerable embarrassment, erupting as it did at the height of the Cold War, only a year before the still-more dramatic revelations of the Profumo affair. The Vassall Tribunal was held to inquire into whether the failure to detect Vassall earlier amounted to a failure of intelligence, as many British newspapers had claimed. It also investigated suggestions that the close relations between Vassall and Tam Galbraith had been improper. However, in its conclusions the tribunal found no evidence for impropriety, and largely exonerated the government.

== Later years ==
Vassall served ten years of his sentence, in Wormwood Scrubs, Maidstone and Durham prisons. He was befriended in prison by social reformer Lord Longford. He was eventually released on parole in October 1972.

He then wrote a memoir, published in 1975 as Vassall: the autobiography of a spy. He described it as "a kind of self-justification, not as regards my espionage activities, but as regards my position as a human being, and, perhaps, my ability to make and keep friends in all walks of life". Rex Winsbury called the book "[a] cross between Jennifer's Diary [the society column of Queen magazine] and James Bond, ... bewildering both for Vassall's own transparent naivety and social snobbism, ... and for the equally transparent naivety of the British Foreign Office and security forces". Peter Martland describes the book as "self-serving".

Vassall subsequently changed his surname to Phillips, settled in St John's Wood, London, and worked quietly as an administrator at the British Records Association, and for a firm of solicitors in Gray's Inn. He died after suffering a heart attack on a London bus in November 1996: it was not until nearly three weeks later that the press became aware of his death.

== Assessment ==
Commentators have varied considerably in assessing the factors that led Vassall to spy for a foreign power, and the extent to which he acted from political motives, for financial reward, to boost his own self-esteem, or whether he should be seen as primarily a victim of Soviet intrigue and British homophobic prejudice.

Rebecca West, in her book The New Meaning of Treason (1964) demurred from the notion that Vassall was "a weak and silly little man ... This was unlikely to be the correct view of a man who for seven years had carried on an occupation [espionage] demanding unremitting industry in a skilled craft carried on in clandestine conditions, an endless capacity for dissimulation, and sustained contempt for personal danger." West termed him, rather, "a professional spy, working within the conventions of his profession, [who] had no more been blackmailed into the exercise of his profession than any lawyer". West suggested that the claim of blackmail was "putting up a smoke-screen to conceal what he had done." Observing that Vassall had been well paid by the Soviets for his spying, West wrote: "The drunken party may have taken place, but it was probably engineered so that Vassall might refer to it should his treachery ever be discovered ... Only a very stupid and helpless man would have succumbed [to a blackmail threat], and Vassall was not stupid; he was extremely resourceful."

Also in 1964, MI5 published a 50-page pamphlet for civil servants, Their Trade is Treachery, which asserted that Vassall had "claimed that at first he was blackmailed, but later he clearly became a mercenary spy."

Following the publication of Vassall's autobiography in 1975, Hungarian émigré George Mikes concluded that, although his homosexuality undoubtedly "made him such an easy prey to the Russians", it was "his vanity, his childish snobbery, his devouring ambition and complete lack of humour that pushed him so deep into the quagmire".

Patrick Higgins similarly argued in 1996 that "[w]hile it was [Vassall]'s homosexuality that allowed the Russians to collect an album of incriminating photographs, it was his social ambition, his dreams of a grander life and the resentments that he felt towards his superiors that led to him becoming a spy. Vassall was a blackmail victim who grew richer, not poorer. ... [He] spied because it allowed him to indulge his social fantasies."

More recently, in 2024, Alex Grant sees Vassall as "a man trapped by the moral climate of the early 1960s". Grant argues that the Russian act of blackmail "was not an isolated incident but a carefully choreographed sequence of events. In short, Vassall was groomed" – and that, at the party in Moscow, "it is clear that he was anally raped". He was coerced into spying, but "did not seem perceptive enough to realise the full extent of what the Russians had done", and "never pondered the political, diplomatic or security consequences of his actions."

== In popular culture ==
Contemporary media coverage (particularly in tabloids such as the Sunday Pictorial and Daily Mail) promoted the idea of an improper relationship between Vassall and Tam Galbraith, drawing on highly dubious evidence including letters written by Galbraith with the opening salutation "My Dear Vassall". This inspired a memorable sketch on the satirical BBC programme That Was the Week That Was, broadcast in early 1963, in which Lance Percival played a senior civil servant detecting sexual innuendo in this and similar conventional pleasantries.

In 1980, the BBC broadcast a docudrama about the affair (as the first episode in a series, Spy!), in which Vassall was played by John Normington as "weak, vain and keen to be thought a gentleman", and Geoffrey Bennett was played by John Nettleton. Bennett and Lady Iris Hayter (wife of the British ambassador in Moscow when Vassall arrived there) subsequently complained to the BBC that they had not been consulted or advised that they were to be portrayed in the drama.

Other, more oblique, allusions to the Vassall affair have been observed in John le Carré's novel The Spy Who Came in from the Cold (1963); the James Bond film From Russia with Love (1963); and C. P. Snow's novel Corridors of Power (1964).

== See also ==
- British political scandals
