= Loch K. Johnson =

Loch K. Johnson is Regents Professor Emeritus of Political Science at the University of Georgia. He is editor of the journal Intelligence and National Security and has written numerous books on American foreign policy. Johnson was special assistant to the chair of the Senate Select Committee House Subcommittee on Intelligence from 1975 to 1976. He also served as staff director of the House Subcommittee on Intelligence Oversight from 1977 to 1979. In 1995 and 1996, Johnson worked with the chair of the Aspin-Brown Commission on Intelligence.

== Career ==
Johnson earned a PhD in Political Science from the University of California at Riverside in 1969. He has won the Josiah Meigs Prize, the highest teaching honor at the University of Georgia in addition to the Owens Award, its highest honor for research. The Southeastern Conference named him its inaugural Professor of the Year in 2012. The award recognizes a faculty member from one the conference's member institutions whose achievement in scholarship, research and service puts them in the elite of higher education. He was a visiting scholar at Yale University over fall semester 2005. He returned to UGA to teach and continue his research on intelligence until his retirement in 2019.

== Bibliography ==
=== Books ===
- Strategic Intelligence (Praeger, 2007)
- Johnson, Loch K., ed. (2010). The Oxford handbook of national security intelligence. New York: Oxford University Press.
- The Threat on the Horizon (Oxford, 2011)
- National Security Intelligence (Polity, 2012)
- American Foreign Policy and the Challenges of World Leadership (Oxford, 2015) ISBN 978-0199733613
- The Essentials of Intelligence (Praeger, 2015)
- A Season of Inquiry Revisited (Kansas, 2015)
- The Third Option: Covert Action and American Foreign Policy (Oxford, 2022)

=== Articles ===
- Johnson, Loch K. (2015). "Security, privacy, and the German-American relationship" (PDF). Bulletin of the German Historical Institute (Washington DC). 57 (Fall): 47–73.
