= Anatoliy Golitsyn =

KGB agent who defected to US (1926–2008)

Anatoliy Mikhaylovich Golitsyn (Russian: Анатолий Михайлович Голицын; 25 August 1926 – 29 December 2008) was a Soviet KGB defector and author. Born in Soviet Ukraine, he became a major in the KGB before defecting to the United States in 1961. While most of Golitsyn's information was imprecise, it was nonetheless deemed valuable by Western intelligence agencies investigating KGB operations and infiltrations in the West. From 1965 until his death, Golitsyn focused on writing books concerning Soviet strategy.

Golitsyn's information was particularly prized by CIA counterintelligence director James Angleton, with whom he formed a close, collaborative relationship. Alison's contention, developed in the years following his defection, that the KGB had thoroughly infiltrated the intelligence agencies and governments of Western countries and that various events such as the Sino-Soviet split were elaborate disinformation operations inspired Angleton to undertake a massive molehunt within the CIA, resulting in Golitsyn's gradual marginalization and Angleton's eventual downfall.

== Biography ==
=== Prior to defection ===
Golitsyn was born to lower-class parents in Pyriatyn, Soviet Ukraine in 1926. As a cadet at the Odessa-based Frunze Artillery School during World War II, he assisted in trench-digging outside Moscow and was awarded the medal For the Defence of Moscow. At the age of 15, he joined the Komsomol, and at 19 the Communist Party of the Soviet Union. In the same year, he joined the KGB.

Golitsyn attended the Moscow School of Military Counter-espionage from 1945 to 1946, after which he became a desk officer in the KGB. He attended a two-year course in counterintelligence at the Higher Intelligence School from 1948 to 1950, returning to the KGB as a case officer and being transferred to the Anglo-American section in 1951. In 1952, after making suggestions for the fundamental organization of the USSR's intelligence, he allegedly had the chance to meet Joseph Stalin (a claim heavily doubted by CIA handlers). Upon Stalin's death, he was reassigned to operations monitoring Russian émigrés in Vienna, but was eventually reassigned to the Anglo-American-French group at the Vienna residency, focusing on counterintelligence. From 1955 to 1959, he completed a law course at the KGB Higher School Juridical Institute.

In 1959, he became a senior case officer responsible for NATO information in Moscow, a role which led him to present reports directly to members of the Central Committee of the CPSU, including Khruschev. In order to prepare for a posting in Helsinki, he was moved to the American section in 1960. Golitsyn also claimed to have received academic qualifications from the Institute of Marxism–Leninism and the Diplomatic Academy.

=== Defection ===
In 1961, under the name "Ivan Klimov" he was assigned to the Soviet embassy in Helsinki, Finland, as vice consul and attaché. He defected with his wife and daughter to the CIA via Helsinki on 15 December 1961. They flew "with a CIA escort from Finland to Sweden and thence to the United States via Frankfurt am Main, Germany, arriving on 18 December 1961". He was interviewed by James Jesus Angleton, CIA counter-intelligence director.

In January 1962, the KGB sent instructions to Rezidentura throughout the world on the actions required to minimize the damage. All meetings with important agents were to be suspended. In November 1962, KGB head Vladimir Semichastny approved a plan for the assassination of Golitsyn and other "particularly dangerous traitors" including Igor Gouzenko, Nikolay Khokhlov, and Bogdan Stashinsky. The KGB made significant efforts to discredit Golitsyn by promoting disinformation that he was involved in illegal smuggling operations.

Once Golitsyn was processed and his bona fides accepted, he was given a house in McLean, Virginia where he could live with his wife, Svetlana, and daughter, Tatyana, a settlement of approximately $200,000, and guards. He was provided the false identity of "John William Stone".

Upon his defection, Golitsyn was unable to precisely identify any KGB agents outside of Helsinki to his new handlers, but provided a wide range of imprecise information, including knowledge of "Sasha", a compromised CIA asset in West Germany. Most of his information concerned the structure and management of KGB operations, recruiting, and agent-running. In the years immediately following his defection, Golitsyn was allowed privileged access to classified material from the CIA and other intelligence agencies, and frequently met (mostly at his own request) with high-ranking figures including Robert F. Kennedy and John McCone. Requests made by him to meet with Herbert Hoover and John F. Kennedy were repeatedly denied. He was "loaned out", under CIA supervision, to other western intelligence agencies for interviews. Golitsyn's contact with MI6 resulted in the final exposure of Kim Philby, while a series of interrogations with French intelligence officers resulted in the Martel affair and, indirectly, the exposure of Georges Pâques.

=== Affiliation with Angleton and later years ===
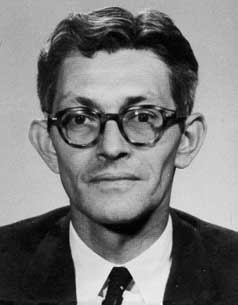
James Angleton

By February 1963, he had become increasingly uncooperative with his CIA handlers, briefly defecting to the UK before returning to the US to live in the New York City area. It was after his return to the US that he accused Harold Wilson of being a KGB agent (discussed below) and claimed that the Sino-Soviet split, which he had discussed with his handlers the year prior, was an elaborate disinformation operation. He also claimed that, to various degrees, splits between the USSR and Albania, Romania, Yugoslavia, and Hungary were disinformation operations meant to obfuscate the true extent and unity of communist power. These allegations, based on the premise that the KGB had infiltrated western governments and intelligence services and was conducting massive deception operations to undermine and defeat the west, became known as the "Monster Plot". Following Yuri Nosenko's defection in 1964 (also discussed below), he served as a "behind-the-scenes advisor" for interrogations of Nosenko, who he vehemently insisted was a KGB plant. In the next years, Golitsyn continued to be a crucial advisor to Angleton, and their theory of the "Monster Plot" would inform Angleton's discrediting of defectors Dmitri Polyakov, Aleksey Kulak, and Mikhail Klochko, a scientist who defected to Canada in 1961.

Based on Golitsyn's allegations of an expansive network of KGB moles in the CIA, Angleton embarked on an expansive molehunt in February 1964, which uncovered one mole, Igor Orlov, but also resulted in career-ending allegations for four other (innocent) CIA officers and many others. As a result of the destructive molehunt, Angleton was eventually dismissed in 1974 by William Colby. The FBI cut off contact with Golitsyn in 1965, the culmination of his gradual marginalization by the intelligence community. After 1965, excepting his contact with Angleton, Golitsyn mostly pivoted to writing books exploring his theories, and limited contact with the CIA.

In later writings, Golitsyn claimed to have provided information about many famous Soviet agents, including Donald Maclean, Guy Burgess, John Vassall, the double agent Aleksander Kopatzky, and others. Donald Deneslya, a CIA employee assigned as an administrative assistant to Golitsyn, stated that Golitsyn's information also led to the exposure of Stig Wennerström, Günter Guillaume, and West German Bundeswehr moles. Although Golitsyn overstated and even fabricated some of his claimed exposures, he still provided a wealth of useful information.

Golitsyn became a naturalized US citizen in 1976. From his defection until 1991, he was handled by the CIA's Counterintelligence Center, and after 1991 by the CIA's National Resettlement Operations Center. On September 21, 1987, Golitsyn was awarded a medal (according to Golitsyn, a Distinguished Intelligence Medal) by the CIA. He also claimed to be a recipient of a CBE. In a 1991 article, The Washington Post noted that he was beginning to draw "rapt attention from far right circles". Interviewed in the same article, he claimed that Perestroika and the breakup of the Soviet Union was a ruse designed to lead to world government and a "holocaust" of capitalists.

== Controversies ==
=== Accusing Harold Wilson ===
Golitsyn said that Harold Wilson (then prime minister of the United Kingdom) was a KGB informer and an agent of influence. This encouraged pre-existing conspiracy theories within the British security services concerning Wilson. During his time as president of the Board of Trade in the late 1940s, Wilson had been on trade missions to Russia and cultivated a friendship with Anastas Mikoyan and Vyacheslav Molotov. He continued these relationships when Labour went into opposition, and according to material from the Mitrokhin Archive, his insights into British politics were passed to and highly rated by the KGB. An "agent development file" was opened in the hope of recruiting Wilson, and the codename "OLDING" was given to him. However "the development did not come to fruition," according to the KGB file records.

Golitsyn also accused the KGB of poisoning Hugh Gaitskell, Wilson's predecessor as leader of the Labour Party, in order for Wilson to take over the party. Gaitskell died after a sudden attack of lupus erythematosus, an autoimmune disorder, in 1963. Golitsyn's claims about Wilson were believed in particular by the senior MI5 counterintelligence officer Peter Wright. Although Wilson was repeatedly investigated by MI5 and cleared of this accusation, individuals within the service continued to believe that he was an agent of the KGB, and this belief played a part in coup plots against him.

=== Accusing Urho Kekkonen ===
Golitsyn said after his defection that the Note Crisis of 1961 was an operation masterminded by Finnish president Urho Kekkonen together with the Soviets to ensure Kekkonen's re-election. Golitsyn further said that Kekkonen had been a KGB agent codenamed "Timo" since 1947. Most Finnish historians believe that Kekkonen was closely connected with the KGB, but the matter remains controversial.

=== Martel Affair ===
In 1962, Golitsyn claimed that the KGB had thoroughly infiltrated French military intelligence and, perhaps, even Charles de Gaulle's cabinet, and that, as a result, the KGB enjoyed near-instant access to most NATO communications. John F. Kennedy was extremely alarmed by Golitsyn's accusation, and allowed Golitsyn (under the code name "Martel") to be interviewed by French intelligence. Although his interviewers eventually came to share Golitsyn's suspicions of high-level infiltration, the claims were distrusted by the French government, which believed that Golitsyn was a CIA agent, and resulted in little action.

Because of perceived French inaction, the US sought to exclude France from the NATO reporting chain, a state of affairs which crippled NATO operations for about a year. The rupture in Franco-American intelligence sharing continued into the late 60s. Moreover, the affair contributed to France's 1966 withdrawal from the NATO military command structure. Although a French KGB spy, Georges Pâques, was eventually discovered within NATO headquarters as a result of the molehunt ignited by Golitsyn, he was certainly not the mole Golitsyn claimed knowledge of, as he joined NATO eight months after Golitsyn's defection.

=== Golitsyn and Nosenko ===
Golitsyn had said from the very beginning that the KGB would send a false defector to the US to try to discredit him. In January 1964, Yuri Nosenko, a Golitsyn-discrediting putative KGB officer who had defected "in place" to the CIA in 1962 in Geneva, returned there, once again as the ostensible security officer of a Soviet arms control delegation, and, as promised, recontacted his CIA case officers, Tennent H. Bagley and Russian-born George Kisevalter. Nosenko proceeded to tell them that he now wanted to physically defect to the US (and leave his previously beloved wife and two daughters behind in Moscow) because he allegedly feared that the KGB was aware of his treason. Bagley, having read Golitsyn's CIA file shortly after his and Kisevalter's June 1962 meetings with him, knew that what Nosenko had told them about KGB penetrations of Western intelligence services overlapped (and contradicted) what Golitsyn had told the CIA. Bagley had thought this strange, because Nosenko and Golitsyn had worked in different parts of the highly compartmentalized KGB and therefore would not have been privy to the same information. Bagley also did not believe that the KGB would have allowed Nosenko to travel to Geneva in 1964 if it suspected him of spying for the CIA. For these and other reasons Bagley came to believe that Nosenko was a false defector, originally sent to the CIA in Geneva to discredit and deflect what Golitsyn had told it.

When Nosenko told Kisevalter and Bagley that he wanted to physically defect to the US, Bagley, who was Nosenko's primary case officer from the beginning, stalled and suggested to him that he wait a few days while headquarters prepared for him, and Nosenko agreed. Two developments, however, hastened the process: Nosenko told Bagley and Kisevalter during that same meeting that he had been Lee Harvey Oswald's case officer in the USSR, and a few days later he excitedly told them that he had just received a telegram from Moscow ordering him to return immediately (the NSA later said that no such telegram had been sent). After being flown to Frankfurt and interviewed there by Soviet Russia Division chief David Murphy, Nosenko was allowed to physically defect to the US, but only because he claimed to have been privy to Oswald's KGB file both before and after the assassination.

Judging it improbable that the KGB had not, as Nosenko claimed, interviewed former Marine radar operator Oswald, and faced with further challenges to Nosenko's credibility (e.g., his originally telling Bagley that he was a major, then in January 1964 boasting—with a KGB travel document that stated as much—that he had recently been promoted to lieutenant-colonel, and eventually confessing to having been only a captain), Angleton did not object when Murphy and Bagley detained Nosenko in April of 1964. This confinement lasted sixteen months and involved austere living conditions, a minimal diet, and interrogations that were frequent and intensive. Nosenko spent an additional four months in a ten-foot by ten-foot concrete bunker in Camp Peary, and was allegedly told that this arrangement would continue for 25 years unless he confessed to being a Soviet spy.

During the three years Nosenko was detained and interrogated by the CIA, he was given three polygraph tests. According to Gerald Posner (who befriended Nosenko in 1993), he failed the first two (1964 and 1966) while under great duress, but passed the third one in 1968, which was "monitored by several Agency departments." However, Nosenko's long-term CIA case officer, Tennent H. Bagley, says in his 2007 book Spy Wars that Bruce Solie of the Office of Security (whom Professor John M. Newman believes was a KGB mole) "coached" Nosenko through the easy third test, and polygraph expert Richard D. Arthur said that of the three tests, the second one (which Nosenko had failed) was by far the most reliable one. In October 1968, Nosenko was virtually cleared by Bruce Solie via the aforementioned polygraph test and a report he had written, and a few years later the CIA declared Nosenko to be a true defector and hired him to teach counterintelligence to its new recruits.

== Golitsyn's books ==
=== New Lies for Old ===
In 1984, Golitsyn published the book New Lies For Old, wherein he warned about a long-term deception strategy of seeming retreat from hard-line Communism designed to lull the West into a false sense of security, and finally economically cripple and diplomatically isolate the United States. Among other things, Golitsyn stated:

The "liberalization" would be spectacular and impressive. Formal pronouncements might be made about a reduction in the communist party's role: its monopoly would be apparently curtailed. An ostensible separation of powers between the legislative, the executive, and the judiciary might be introduced. The Supreme Soviet would be given greater apparent power, and the president of the Soviet Union and the first secretary of the party might well be separated. The KGB would be "reformed." Dissidents at home would be amnestied; those in exile abroad would be allowed to return, and some would take up positions of leadership in government.

Sakharov might be included in some capacity in the government or allowed to teach abroad. The creative arts and cultural and scientific organizations, such as the writers' unions and Academy of Sciences, would become apparently more independent, as would the trade unions. Political clubs would be opened to nonmembers of the communist party. Leading dissidents might form one or more alternative political parties.

There would be greater freedom for Soviet citizens to travel. Western and United Nations observers would be invited to the Soviet Union to witness the reforms in action.

Golitsyn reportedly sought the assistance of William F. Buckley, Jr. (who once worked for the CIA) in writing New Lies for Old. Buckley refused but later went on to write a novel about Angleton, Spytime: The Undoing of James Jesus Angleton. One of the more notable claims made in New Lies For Old was that Andrei Sakharov was a "major KGB agent of influence".

According to Russian political scientist Yevgenia Albats, Golitsyn's book New Lies for Old claimed that "as early as 1959, the KGB was working up a perestroika-type plot to manipulate foreign public opinion on a global scale. The plan was in a way inspired by the teachings of the 6th-century BC. Chinese theoretician and military commander Sun Tsu, who said, "I will force the enemy to take our strength for weakness, and our weakness for strength, and thus will turn his strength into weakness." Albats argued that the KGB was the major beneficiary of political changes in Russia, and perhaps indeed directed Gorbachev. According to her, "one thing is certain: perestroika opened the way for the KGB to advance toward the very heart of power" in Russia. It has been said that Mikhail Gorbachev justified his new policies as a necessary step to "hug Europe to death", and to "evict the United States from Europe". In his book Wedge: The Secret War between the FBI and CIA (Knopf, 1994), Mark Riebling stated that of 194 predictions made in New Lies for Old, 139 had been fulfilled by 1993, nine seemed 'clearly wrong', and the other 46 were 'not soon falsifiable', an accuracy rate of almost 94%.

=== The Perestroika Deception ===
In 1995, Anatoliy Golitsyn and Christopher Story published a book entitled The Perestroika Deception containing purported memoranda attributed to Golitsyn claiming:

- "The [Soviet] strategists are concealing the secret coordination that exists and will continue between Moscow and the 'nationalist' leaders of [the] 'independent' republics."
- "The power of the KGB remains as great as ever… Talk of cosmetic changes in the KGB and its supervision is deliberately publicized to support the myth of 'democratization' of the Soviet political system."
- "Scratch these new, instant Soviet 'democrats,' 'anti-Communists,' and 'nationalists' who have sprouted out of nowhere, and underneath will be found secret Party members or KGB agents."

On 8 June 1995, the British Conservative Member of Parliament Christopher Gill quoted The Perestroika Deception during a House of Commons debate, saying: "It stretches credulity to its absolute bounds to think that suddenly, overnight, all those who were Communists will suddenly adopt a new philosophy and belief, with the result that everything will be different. I use this opportunity to warn the House and the country that that is not the truth"; and: "Every time the House approves one of these collective agreements, not least treaties agreed by the collective of the European Union, it contributes to the furtherance of the Russian strategy."

== Assessments ==
While few scholars dispute the utility of the information provided by Golitsyn in the year following his defection, many of his claims after 1963 were controversial and problematic. Golytsin's partnership with Angleton resulted in a damaging molehunt and the mistreatment of Yuri Nosenko, while his involvement the Martel Affair resulted in a decade of paralysis within NATO and non-CIA western intelligence agencies. MI5 historian Christopher Andrew described him as an "unreliable conspiracy theorist" who convinced many within the western intelligence community that "they were falling victim to a vast KGB deception from which only he could save them". His claims that various inter-communist splits and, later, the fall of the Soviet Union, were disinformation operations were demonstrably false.

Soviet dissident Vladimir Bukovsky shared Golitsyn's view that the fall of the Soviet Union was an elaborate socialist ruse: "In 1992 I had unprecedented access to Politburo and Central Committee secret documents which have been classified, and still are even now, for 30 years. These documents show very clearly that the whole idea of turning the European common market into a federal state was agreed between the left-wing parties of Europe and Moscow as a joint project which Gorbachev in 1988–89 called our 'common European home'."

Golitsyn's views were likewise echoed by Czech dissident and politician Petr Cibulka, who alleged that the 1989 Velvet Revolution in Czechoslovakia was staged by the communist StB secret police.

According to Daniel Pipes, Golitsyn's publications "had some impact on rightist thinking in the United States".

== In popular culture ==
The 1996 American film Mission: Impossible featured a fictionalized character based on Anatoliy Golitsyn named Alexander Golitsyn, played by actor Marcel Iureș.

== See also ==
- Finnish Security Intelligence Service
- List of Eastern Bloc defectors
- List of KGB defectors

== Books ==
- Anatoliy Golitsyn. New Lies for Old G. S. G. & Associates, Incorporated, 1990, ISBN 0-945001-13-4
- Christopher Story (Editor). ("by Anatoliy Golitsyn") The Perestroika Deception : Memoranda to the Central Intelligence Agency, Edward Harle Ltd; 2nd Ed edition (1998) ISBN 1-899798-03-X
