= David Murphy (CIA) =

CIA officer in Berlin

David Murphy (June 23, 1921–August 28, 2014) was the Central Intelligence Agency's station chief in Berlin from 1959 to 1961. In that position, he advised John F. Kennedy on how to react to the construction of the Berlin Wall. Subsequently, he became chief of the CIA's Soviet Russia operation division. He then became station chief in Paris prior to retiring from the Agency

In 1997, he and his counterpart, former KGB Berlin Chief Sergei Kondrashev, along with journalist George Bailey co-wrote Battleground Berlin, a memoir of the Cold War.
