= Virtual USA =

- Formation: 2009
- Purpose: Information sharing
- Region served: Portions of the United States
- Official language: English
- Parent organization: United States Department of Homeland Security
- Website: dhs open government plan

Virtual USA (vUSA), is a joint federal and state collaboration on a project that would allow state and local on-line tools and technologies, such as caches of geospatial data, to be interoperable and more useful with the goal of creating a "Virtual USA" for emergency response purposes. The initiative was developed by the DHS Directorate for Science and Technology (S&T), and currently operates as a pilot in eight states — Alabama, Georgia, Florida, Louisiana, Mississippi, Texas, Virginia and Tennessee — with plans to incorporate additional states.

Virtual USA is part of the DHS' Open Government plan, which is part of the Obama administration's goal to promote a greater amount of transparency and openness between the government and citizens.

== Purpose and overview ==
The stated goal of Virtual USA is to aggregate existing data, from federal, state, local, tribal, and other information into a common operating picture to assist first responders during emergencies.

Virtual USA:

- Virtual USA utilizes current information-sharing platforms to permit new and existing technologies to exchange information with one another.
- Virtual USA is based on the needs of local and state first responders to manage data access within their own jurisdictions and to share information with relevant jurisdictions across the United States.
- Virtual USA is not limited to information exchanges between two agencies; instead, the initiative fosters information sharing among all federal, state, local and tribal authorities.
- Virtual USA uses open data standards and open-source software, more states and localities are able to join this information exchange project.
- Virtual USA allows Americans in their own communities to contribute information—in real-time to support the efforts of police, fire and emergency management officials during disasters and recovery efforts.

== Statistics ==
- In the state of Virginia, Virtual USA has reduced response times to incidents involving hazardous materials by 70 percent.

== Similar systems ==
- Virtual Alabama

== See also ==
- Joint Regional Information Exchange System
- Multistate Anti-Terrorism Information Exchange
- Regional Information Sharing Systems
