= Open Source Software Institute =

- Company type: Nonprofit
- Industry: Open-source software
- Founded: 2000
- Founder: John Weathersby; John Farrell; Andrew Murren
- Headquarters: Woodbridge, VA
- Area served: United States
- Website: www.ossinstitute.org

The Open Source Software Institute (OSSI) is a U.S.-based 501(c)(6), non-profit organization whose mission is to promote the development and implementation of open-source software solutions within US Federal, state and municipal government agencies.

== History ==
OSSI was established in 2000 and has focused on strategic initiatives to promote the adoption of open source within US Department of Defense and Department of Homeland Security.

== Projects ==
Efforts include securing the Federal Information Processing Standards FIPS 140-2 validation for the OpenSSL cryptographic module library, participation in development of the U.S. Navy's Open Source Guidance Document, securing the Open Source Corporate Management Information System (OSCMIS) with the Defense Information Systems Agency, and working with the Department of Homeland Security's Science and Technology Directorate to establish and implement the Homeland Open Security Technology (HOST) program, which promotes open security.

== See also ==
- Open Solutions Alliance
- Open Source Initiative
