= Homeland Security Information Network =

Government communication network

The Homeland Security Information Network (HSIN) is a web-based platform, run by the Department of Homeland Security, which is designed to allow local, state, tribal, and federal government agencies to share "Sensitive But Unclassified (SBU)" information with each other over a secure channel.

The HSIN provides three main functional categories. First, it provides a SharePoint web portal system which allows agencies and events to have a basic workspace for collaboration. Second, it provides a Jabber chat system, with user managed rooms. Third, it provides the Common Operational Picture, a custom executive situational awareness web application based on Oracle HTML DB.

The Department of Homeland Security has publicly announced that the network has so far been hacked at least twice in 2009—once in March and once in April.

== See also ==
- Automated Trusted Information Exchange
- Joint Regional Information Exchange System
- Multistate Anti-Terrorism Information Exchange
- National Criminal Intelligence Sharing Plan
- Regional Information Sharing Systems
- Surveillance
