= Automated Trusted Information Exchange =

Automated Trusted Information Exchange (ATIX) is a computer database containing homeland security and terrorist threat information, which is part of the U.S. government's Regional Information Sharing Systems (RISS) program.

== See also ==
- Homeland Security Information Network
- Joint Regional Information Exchange System
- Multistate Anti-Terrorism Information Exchange
- National Criminal Intelligence Sharing Plan
- Surveillance
