= Intelligence sharing =

Exchange of military intelligence between organisations or states

Intelligence sharing is "the ability to exchange intelligence, information, data, or knowledge among Federal, state, local or private-sector entities as appropriate." Intelligence sharing also involves intergovernmental bilateral or multilateral agreements and through international organizations. Intelligence sharing is meant to facilitate the use of actionable intelligence to a broader range of decision-makers.

Intelligence sharing is contrasted with information sharing, which may share the same methods of dissemination, but involves non-evaluated materials that have not been put through the rigors of the intelligence cycle.

== History ==
Intelligence sharing, as a formal action performed by intelligence agencies and intergovernmental organizations, is a newer phenomena. Especially in the United States Intelligence Community (IC), intelligence sharing was not formalized until after the 9/11 terrorist attacks, when the need for intelligence sharing was the greatest. Before 9/11, many of the major US intelligence agencies, especially the Federal Bureau of Investigation (FBI) and the Central Intelligence Agency (CIA) were protective of their information, and were unwilling to share information with the other agency, finding the other's methods to interfere with better procedure. The formalization of intelligence sharing began with the Patriot Act, the Homeland Security Act and the Intelligence Reform and Terrorism Prevention and Act of 2004, which changed the overall structure of the US intelligence community, and formed the Department of Homeland Security The Department of Homeland Security (DHS) also became the umbrella organization for 15 intelligence agencies, between which the DHS would facilitate information sharing and collaboration.

In addition, the formation of the Office of the Director of National Intelligence facilitated the sharing of intelligence between agencies and administrates several centers for improving intelligence work, including the Information Sharing Environment.

== Types of intelligence sharing networks ==
According to Joseph Pfeifer, there are four different type of networks which can be created to facilitate intelligence sharing: hierarchical, co-located liaisons, hub-and-spoke, and network fusion.

Hierarchical linear intelligence systems involve singular, point to point connections between agencies, such as between a federal and state level organization, a state organization to a local entity, or bilateral agreements between states. These sharing mechanisms tend to be slow, but allow for increased security, as there is a tightly controlled exchange of intelligence.

Co-located liaisons networks involve the creation of cooperative, multi-agency or multi-governmental locations which house representatives and analysts from a diverse set of agencies. In these organizations, there are typically dedicated buildings and organizations to facilitate such intelligence sharing. The most common example of co-located liaisons networks are fusion centers, which are formed from agencies or governments which have similar goals, and facilitate intelligence sharing in a common place.

Hub-and-spoke network organization of intelligence sharing involves a common connection to intelligence and information, typically through secured networks to common servers and databases which all members can access. This method of intelligence sharing is employed by the Department of Homeland Security, which has NIPRNet and SIPRNet databases which connects its member agencies. Intellipedia is also a form of hub-and-spoke intelligence sharing.

Network fusion involves a combination of these networks which best facilitates the intelligence sharing for the particular organizations which utilize it. It is this multilevel integration of sharing techniques which many find to be lacking most between intelligence organizations.

== Fields of shared intelligence ==
Intelligence sharing occurs in every field that intelligence analysis is produced. The main fields of intelligence analysis are national security, law enforcement, and competitive. In each of these fields, intelligence is shared between agencies, bureaus, governments, or business partners in order to further their organizational goals. These goals can range from protecting people from violent threats, finding and apprehending criminals, or maintaining competitive advantage over other companies.

=== National security ===
In the United States, national security intelligence sharing occurs on many levels, ranging from field offices of IC organs to the White House. The intelligence sharing became a formalized policy after 9/11, when several Congressional acts reorganized the intelligence community and formalized intelligence sharing practices throughout. The Department of Homeland Security, Office of the Director of National Intelligence, and various fusion centers throughout the United States have been the vehicles for intelligence sharing. Their overall success in alleviating problems of intelligence sharing and effectiveness of operations has varied, but the need for improvements is acknowledged.

In Europe, national security operations are carried out by various national agencies and the collective efforts of police forces through Europol and Interpol. Europol intelligence sharing became an imperative after 9/11 in much the same way of the US. In November 2001, a European Council meeting created the Counter Terrorist Task Force, which facilitated increased counter-terror efforts in EU member states and encouraged intelligence sharing between member states to prevent an attack similar to 9/11. Subsequent terrorist attacks in London and Madrid in 2004 and 2005 "gave impetus to EU initiatives", and the creation of the Counterterrorism Coordinator increased collective efforts for national security aims for member states.

Since 2001, legislation and informal meetings between the US Secretary of State, Director of Homeland Security, and other ministerial members of the US intelligence community have met with their counterparts in EU ministries to discuss shared objectives and provide information on transport security and impeding terrorist travel.

=== Law enforcement ===
According to the US National Criminal Intelligence Sharing Plan (NCISP), the law enforcement community went through similar changes as the national security community in order to perform to new expectations in the wake of the 9/11 attacks. The NCISP "was designed by state, local, tribal, and federal law enforcement partners to provide a path forward in improving the collection and analysis of information to create valuable and actionable intelligence products."

Through the NCISP, there are 9 critical elements, 2 understandings of the systems which work in the intelligence sharing process, and 8 different types of participants. The 9 critical elements are leadership, partnerships, privacy, civil rights and civil liberties; policies, plans and procedures; intelligence process, training, security and safeguarding, technology and standards, and sustainability. The systems which are thought to be needed to achieve the Framework outlined are that the key to the success of information sharing systems is both use and interoperability and system interoperability is a complex problem. The main participants in intelligence sharing are criminal justice and law enforcement agencies below the federal level, federal law enforcement agencies, fusion centers, regional information sharing systems, High Intensity Drug Trafficking Areas (HIDTAs), crime analysis centers, law enforcement professional organizations, and private sector and non-law enforcement organizations.

=== Business ===
In the private intelligence field, businesses of various types, products and services will employ intelligence analysis to further their organizational goals, competitive advantage, and security.

Typical businesses will keep much of their analytic products away from the public eye and especially from competitors. However, the realm of security, especially cyber security is a topic which many businesses have cooperated on in order to create a safer environment for their products, information, and customers. An example of this is the Retail Cyber Intelligence Sharing Center, which is a cooperative from over 30 (specifically) retail companies to share information and intelligence which pertains to the security of retail firms. Collectively, their work attempts to identify common threats and share best practices.
