= Command, Control and Interoperability Division =

Bureau of the US Department of Homeland Security

Seal of the United States Department of Homeland Security

The Command, Control and Interoperability Division is a bureau of the United States Department of Homeland Security's Science and Technology Directorate. This division is responsible for creating informative resources (including standards, frameworks, tools, and technologies) that strengthen communications interoperability, improve Internet security, and integrity and accelerate the development of automated capabilities to help identify potential threats to the U.S.

The division took over most of the functions envisioned by the U.S. Congress for the Office of Emergency Communications (OEC), which was under the Cybersecurity and Communications unit created by the Homeland Security Appropriations Act (2007). These included the coordination of emergency communications planning, preparedness, and response. This particular area serves as the basis for the division's involvement in developing protocols for emergency responders.

Customers include local, tribal, state, federal, international, and private emergency response agencies; agencies that plan for, detect, and respond to hazards; and private-sector partners that own, operate, and maintain the nation's cyber infrastructure.

== Five program areas ==
The CCID is managed by the DHS Directorate for Science and Technology. This division works to accomplish its mission of creating and deploying information resources to enable seamless and secure interactions among homeland security stakeholders. It is also the primary research and development organization of the DHS and is headed by the Under Secretary for Science and Technology. In 2010, this directorate requested for $968 million, which included the proposed $15 million increase to the $74.9 million funding the Command, Control, and Interoperability Division was allocated in 2009.

The CCID is organized through five program areas: Basic/Futures Research; Cyber Security; Knowledge Management Tools; Office for Interoperability and Compatibility; and Reconnaissance, Surveillance, and Investigative Technologies.

=== Basic/Futures Research ===
The Basic/Futures Research program area is led by Dr. Joseph Kielman. The program was put in place to conduct long-term, fundamental research in support of CCID. It also strives to advance technologies that can serve the department and the local, tribal, state, federal, and international partners. This program area also develops and fosters a research community to identify and demonstrate novel information discovery, analysis, and management concepts and capabilities. This enables the division to identify, assess, minimize or prevent the impact of terrorist attacks and natural or man made disasters.

Within the Basic/Futures Research Program are actually two programs. The first is known as the Visual Analytics and Precision Information Environments Program; he second includes the Discrete-Element Computing, Privacy, and Forensics Program.

The Visual Analytics and Precision Information Environments Program uses visually based mathematical methods and computational algorithms to discover, manipulate, or comprehend diverse data. The program also conducts research on novel advanced technologies and techniques for understanding and manipulating information in multiple forms or modes. These techniques tend to include text, video, images, audio, databases, and sensor data. The knowledge found through this program helps to anticipate terrorist incidents and/or catastrophic events.

The Discrete-Element Computing, Privacy, and Forensics Program consists of software algorithms and hardware architectures that access, process and manage multiple types and modes of information. This program assesses threats and consequences, ensuring information privacy and securing the cyber infrastructure while protecting telecommunications interoperability. The Discrete-Element Computing, Privacy, and Forensics Program provides real-time data analysis and decision support against potential threats and imminent disasters.

=== Cyber security ===
The CCID Cyber Security Program Area is run by Dr. Douglas Maughan. The program specializes in cyber-security research, development, testing, and evaluation in order to decrease the amount of economic and national security threats on our nation. This will help secure the nation's current and future critical cyber infrastructure in support of the Department of Homeland Security operational missions and the priorities established in the president's National Strategy to Secure Cyberspace.

Cyber Security has three program areas within the overall program: Information Infrastructure Security (IIS), Cyber Security Research Tools and Techniques (RTT), and Next Generation Technologies (NGT.)

There were also separate activities and programs within the Cyber Security program area. These consist of Defense Technology Experimental Research (DETER)Testbed: Department of Homeland Security Secure Wireless Access Prototype (DSWAP: Domain Name System Security Extensions (DNSSEC) Project: IronKey: Linking the Oil and Gas Industry to Improve Cyber Security (LOGIIC): Project 25 Compliance Assessment Program (P25 CAP): Protected Repository for the Defense of Infrastructure against Cyber Threats (PREDICT.)

=== Knowledge Management Tools ===
The Knowledge Management Tools program area of Command, Control, and Interoperability is led by Dr. John Hoyt and provides knowledge management capabilities to reduce the risk of terrorist attacks, prepare for natural and man-made disasters, and provide an effective response to these disasters. Knowledge Management Tools also develops new tools, devices, and methods to process and analyze massive amounts of information that are widely dispersed and are found in multiple forms.

=== Office for Interoperability and Compatibility ===
The CCID Office for Interoperability and Compatibility is led by Karen Ray. This program area works with emergency response communities and federal partners to improve local, tribal, state, and federal emergency preparedness and response. It also strengthens interoperable wireless communications and improves effective information sharing by developing tools and technologies, to enhance overall planning and coordination at all levels of government through both voice and data. A mission of the Office for Interoperability and Compatibility is to help emergency responders manage incidents and exchange information in real time.

=== Reconnaissance, Surveillance, and Investigative Technologies ===
This program area is led and run by John Price. This area researches develops technologies that aid in the discovery, investigation, and the prosecution of terrorists and criminals. There are also separate programs and activities within the CID Reconnaissance, Surveillance, and Investigative Technologies Program Area.

One is the Digital Ink Library Project. This project is led by Shane Cullen and was successfully transitioned to the United States Secret Service (USSS) in January 2009. The CID worked with United States Secret Service (USSS) forensic investigators to enhance mission effectiveness by digitizing the complete archive of ink samples. As a result, ink sample matching takes seconds as opposed to hours or days, and irreplaceable inks remain secure.

Another project is the RealEyes Project. RealEyes is a cutting-edge technology that enables personal digital assistant (PDA) devices or cell phones to send real-time video and geo-spatial coordinates, view live video from a fixed or mobile camera, control fixed cameras, and immediately stream video from a PDA.
