= EXD =

EXD may refer to:

- Book of Exodus, of the Torah
- DHS Explosives Division, of the United States Department of Homeland Security
- Employee experience design
- Excited delirium, medical condition
- Exeter St Davids railway station, in England
- French abbreviation for Far-right politicians not in a particular party
