= DHS Infrastructure Protection and Disaster Management Division =

Agency overview
- Formed: 2003
- Jurisdiction: United States
- Headquarters: DHS Nebraska Avenue Complex, Washington D.C.
- Agency executive: Jalal Mapar, Acting Director
- Parent agency: DHS Science and Technology Directorate
- Website: DHS Infrastructure Protection and Disaster Management Division

The Infrastructure Protection and Disaster Management Division (IDD) is a division of the Science and Technology Directorate of the United States Department of Homeland Security. Within the Homeland Security Advanced Research Projects Agency, IDD develops technologies to improve and increase the United States' strategic preparedness response to natural and man-made threats through situational awareness, emergency response capabilities, and critical infrastructure protection.

== Overview ==
A brochure published by the United States Department of Homeland Security (DHS) Science and Technology Directorate titled High-Priority Technology Needs (May 2009) identifies technical needs for infrastructure and geophysical research, with several items grouped under the functional area of "incident management". These include:

- Integrated modeling, mapping and simulation
- Personnel monitoring (emergency responder locator systems)
- Personnel monitoring (physiological monitoring of firefighters)
- Incident management enterprise system
- Logistics management
- Analytical tools to quantify interdependencies and cascading consequences across critical infrastructure sectors during disruptions
- Blast analysis and protection for critical infrastructure, including improved understanding of blast failure mechanisms and protective measures
