= Hank Asher =

American businessman (1951–2013)

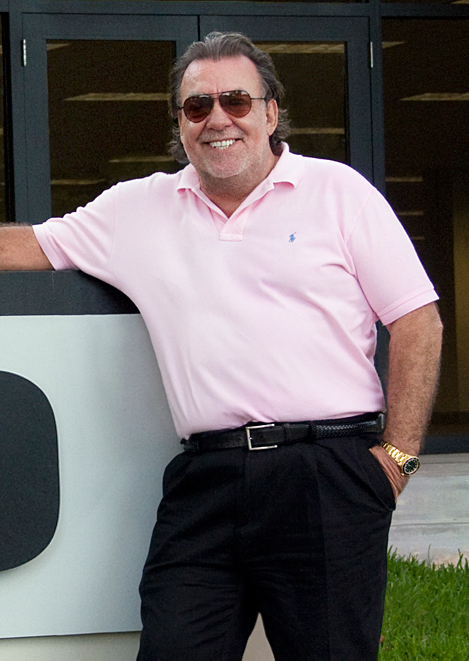
- Born: May 9, 1951; Indiana, U.S.
- Died: January 11, 2013 (aged 61); Boca Raton, Florida, U.S.

Hank Asher (May 9, 1951 – January 11, 2013) was an American businessman who founded several data fusion and data mining companies that compile information about companies, individuals and their interrelationships from thousands of different electronic databases. He was known by industry insiders as "the father of data fusion."

== Early life ==
Asher dropped out of school at the age of 16 and worked as a draftsman in a local factory. Later he worked in a union job painting radio towers, with a house painting business on the side. Asher moved to Florida to avoid the seasonal shutdown in painting, soon establishing a business painting condominiums on Florida's Gold Coast. By the age of 21, he had 100 painters working for him and was reportedly grossing US$10 million a year.

== Career ==
In 1982 Asher smuggled cocaine while living in the Bahamas over a seven-week stint, flying to Colombia and Belize in his plane. Later he joined F. Lee Bailey and the Drug Enforcement Administration, convincing other Americans in Bahamas to exit the drug trade. "He was never charged with a crime, but a cloud of negative publicity has hung over his head for years, even prompting his resignation from Seisint's board [in 2003]."

Asher touted his new company, TLO which stands for "The Last One" as having 100 times the power of his previous inventions. Development started in 2008, and in May 2011, TLOxp came out of preliminary development. Usage reached over 80,000 Law Enforcement Investigators and over 17,000 commercial accounts.

In 2013, the company Hank Asher founded, TLO, was in bankruptcy court with a claim of liabilities at $109 million. In 2014, TransUnion acquired TLO for $154 million.

== Data fusion business ==
Unemployed, Asher began operating as a freelance computer programmer. In 1992, he started a business Database Technologies that used clusters of PCs to provide parallel supercomputing in place of more expensive mainframes and mini computers. His first contract was a data mining application for the insurance industry performed on records bought from the Florida's Department of Motor Vehicles.

DBT Online bought Asher out for US$147 million in 1999 after the FBI and the Drug Enforcement Administration suspended their contracts following revelations with Asher's involvements in drug dealing in the Bahamas and concerns that the company could potentially monitor targets of investigations.

Asher blamed his ouster from Database Technologies on board member Kenneth Langone who joined the company at his invitation.

After departing DBT Online, Asher founded Seisint in 1999 by merging two companies.

ChoicePoint Public Records filed a lawsuit against Asher and Seisint in 2001 at Palm Beach County Circuit Court, alleging Seisint stole technology, including source code and computer hardware with the help of one of Asher's employees who was a well known fraudster and data hacker, Dr. Timothy Klipsic. Asher counter-sued in 2001 in the Fort Lauderdale U.S. District Court alleging unfair business practices by ChoicePoint Director Kenneth Langone and sought more than US$1.6 billion in damages. Both suits were dismissed on March 8, 2005, after ChoicePoint settled, with Asher and Klipsic serving 18 months in federal state prison.

While at Seisint, Hank Asher played a leading role in developing the Multistate Anti-Terrorism Information Exchange (MATRIX) datamining system for the Florida Department of Law Enforcement, described as a tool to help state law enforcement officials identify potential terrorists. The MATRIX program was shut down in June 2005 after federal funding was cut in the wake of public concerns over privacy and state surveillance.

Seisint was later sold to Anglo-Dutch publishing giant Reed Elsevier in July 2004, for US$775 million and combined with its own data aggregation subsidiary, LexisNexis. Asher had retained a large stake in the company and said in an interview that he would earn more than $250 million from the sale.

Asher made considerable donations to U.S. political parties and candidates amounting to US$735,000 from 1999 to 2004 including US$505,000 to the Democrats.

== Death ==
Hank Asher died on January 11, 2013, at the age of 61, in his home in Boca Raton, Florida. According to statements from his company, TLO, Asher "died peacefully".

Asher's death prompted tributes from law enforcement officials and industry leaders, who praised his technological innovations and philanthropic efforts. John Walsh, host of America's Most Wanted, described Asher as having "single-handedly changed the way law enforcement globally hunts for child predators on the Internet".

== Philanthropy ==
=== Work with Missing and Exploited Children ===
Over the course of his career in the data business, Asher donated the services of his respective companies to an indeterminable number of law enforcement agencies and most notably the National Center for Missing and Exploited Children. "No fewer than 109 children have been found as a direct result of Asher's help" according to Ernie Allen, president of National Center for Missing and Exploited Children. Asher is the largest private donor in the history of the National Center for Missing and Exploited Children.

His final venture, TLO, focuses directly on aiding these same groups in the mission of protecting children. Asher supplied law enforcement in all 50 states and 39 countries a system that identifies pedophiles in cyberspace and is responsible for thousands of arrests and child rescues. He has attracted many prominent leaders to assist or support TLO:

- Bob Butterworth, former Florida Attorney General, former Director Florida Department of Children and Families
- Kenneth Hunter, former Chief Postal Inspector, United States Postal Inspection Service
- Mark Lunsford – Father, Jessica Lunsford
- Mike Moore (U.S. politician), former Mississippi Attorney General
- Ed Smart – Father, Elizabeth Smart
- John Walsh – Host, America's Most Wanted, Founder, National Center for Missing and Exploited Children
- Revé Walsh – Founder, National Center for Missing and Exploited Children

In April 2009, Reed Elsevier filed a suit in Palm Beach County Circuit Court which alleged Asher violated his non-compete agreement with the formation of TLO. At the time, Reed Elsevier's attorney, Faith Gay stated, "He is out trying to sell a commercial product. We're seeking damages for any harm that Asher has caused to our customer base...." Asher responded with a counter-suit seeking $1 billion in damages. He said, "This lawsuit is completely without merit, and is a sad and disingenuous attempt to slow down the enormous progress we are making in our efforts to rescue children from sexual predators. I have given my systems to NCMEC for free since 1993. Every child that is rescued because of one of my systems is a paycheck for my soul. The allegation that someday I would charge for this work is insane."

The case was dismissed 15 days prior to the expiration of the non-compete on September 1, 2009. Asher commented "I find it kind of hysterical that they sued me before I competed and the case was dismissed before the non-compete ended."

=== Cancer research ===
Asher began his cancer research in 2001, when he put together a team of doctors and scientists. He started by philanthropically funding and working with Mayo Clinic scientists on research projects he thought had promise. Simultaneously he started clinical trials in Costa Rica to find a cure for his sister's newly diagnosed disease, Multiple Myeloma.

In 2004, Asher formed JARI Research Foundation a philanthropic endeavor to support breakthrough cancer research. The foundation evolved into JARI Research Corporation a year later, in cooperation with the Mayo Clinic. Clinical trials are conducted in the Dominican Republic.

=== Major events ===
Asher had a history of dedicating his personal efforts and the resources of his companies in times of crisis. Two notable events are the September 11 attacks and Beltway sniper attacks.

==== Attacks on September 11, 2001 ====
In the wake of the September 11 attacks, Asher worked with the FBI, constructing a secure room inside the headquarters of his company at the time, Seisint. Asher and his team of programmers worked to identify associates of the terrorists, producing lists of individuals "worth investigating" later leading to "several arrests." Asher said "You could accidentally live next door to Mohammed Atta. You couldn't accidentally live next door to Mohammed Atta twice."

==== Beltway sniper attacks ====
At the height of the 2002 Beltway sniper attacks in the Washington, D.C., area, Asher worked with the FBI utilizing his data fusion invention, the Multistate Anti-Terrorism Information Exchange known as MATRIX to link investigation details to the real identity of John Allen Muhammad. "They produced the list of all his relatives, associates, every place he ever lived," Asher recounts. "The next morning they were in Tacoma, Washington, cutting the stump down that had the projectiles in it that matched the projectiles from the killings." The next evening the snipers were apprehended.
