= National Criminal Intelligence Sharing Plan =

The National Criminal Intelligence Sharing Plan (NCISP) is an intelligence-sharing initiative that links the computer databases of local, state, regional, tribal law enforcement agencies with those of the U.S. federal government.

== See also ==
- Automated Trusted Information Exchange
- Homeland Security Information Network
- Joint Regional Information Exchange System
- Multistate Anti-Terrorism Information Exchange
- Regional Information Sharing Systems
- Surveillance
