= National Urban Security Technology Laboratory =

United States government-owned, government-operated laboratory

National Urban Security Technology Laboratory is a United States government-owned, government-operated laboratory, part of the Department of Homeland Security (DHS) Science & Technology Directorate. It is located in the Federal Office Building at 201 Varick Street in the Hudson Square neighborhood of Manhattan, New York City.

The current Laboratory Director is Alice Hong.

== Mission ==
The laboratory's mission is "to test, evaluate, and analyze homeland security capabilities while serving as a technical authority to first responder, state, and local entities in protecting our cities." In fulfilling this mission, the laboratory serves as a federal technical authority promoting the successful development and integration of homeland security technologies into operational end-user environments.

The lab "is constantly developing and testing new tools for our brave first responders to use in the event of a terrorist attack, industrial accident or natural disaster and closely collaborates with law enforcement agencies ..." Rep. Kathleen Rice, a New York Democrat said on the House floor recently. The lab works on a range of issues, including radiological and nuclear response research and development. It also provides a number of services for law enforcement and first responders, working most closely with New York metropolitan area agencies but also around the country.

== History ==
A recounting of the lab's history shows changing missions and sponsors throughout the past 70 years, and in 2017 celebrated "seven decades of remarkable history – from measuring radioactive fallout during the Cold War, to conducting operational assessments of first responder technologies today." The lab started as part of the Atomic Energy Commission followed by The Energy Research and Development Administration and then the US Department of Energy. In 2003, the lab was transferred into the Department of Homeland Security, Science & Technology Directorate by Sec. 303 of the Homeland Security Act of 2002. The laboratory's name is its third during its history, following the Health and Safety Laboratory from 1953 to 1977 and the Environmental Measurements Laboratory from 1977 to 2009.

=== The Manhattan Project/Atomic Energy Commission (1942–1975) ===
The Laboratory traces its roots to the Manhattan Project. The lab was formed as the Medical Division of the Atomic Energy Commission (AEC) in 1947. In 1949 it was renamed the Health and Safety Division, and in 1953, the Health and Safety Laboratory (HASL). Fallout from nuclear weapons tests became a major concern and the lab's focus later shifted to a network of monitoring stations and measurements of radioactivity in food products.

The HASL Procedures Manual became the standard for environmental radiation measurement techniques. In the 1960s, the lab began taking measurements of radon in mines to assess the health risks of miners.

=== Environmental Measurements Laboratory ===
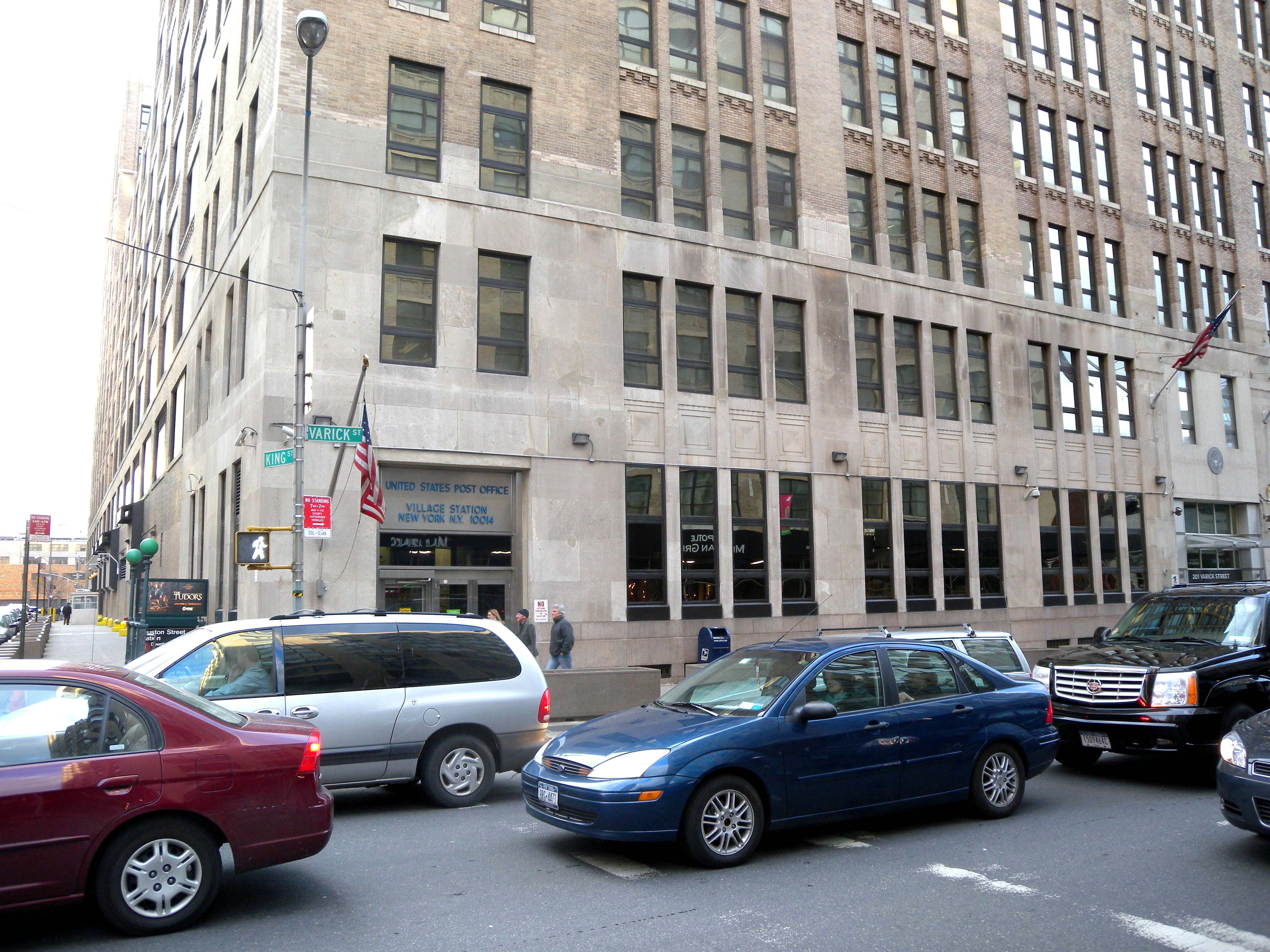
201 Varick Street, Manhattan

In the 1970s, the lab's worldwide sampling programs were expanded to include non-nuclear pollutants. In 1975 the Health and Safety Laboratory became part of the Energy Research and Development Administration, later absorbed by the US Department of Energy, and changed its name to the Environmental Measurements Laboratory (EML).

In the 1970s, the lab established the Quality Assurance Program for environmental dosimeters and radioanalytical measurements, continued work related to nuclear weapons tests, and studied radon in homes. After the Three Mile Island accident and Chernobyl disaster, the lab's work allowed reconstructing the resulting contamination.

In 1997, the lab moved to the Office of Environmental Management. EML's primary focus was to support monitoring, decommissioning, decontamination, and remediation efforts. EML served as an interface on technical issues. EML itself also performed environmental measurements when independent expert assessments were needed. EML continued its worldwide monitoring network and the development of instruments.

=== Transition to the DHS ===
In 2003, EML was absorbed into the Department of Homeland Security (DHS)’s Science and Technology Directorate. According to reports, the transfer and integration into the Department of Homeland Security was not smooth. A congressional hearing into the transition of the lab was held by the House Committee on Science & Technology, Subcommittee on Investigations & Oversight on May 3, 2007 entitled "Transitioning the Environmental Measurements Laboratory at the Department of Homeland Security." The Under Secretary for Science & Technology testified that "EML [Environmental Measurements Laboratory] will remain in the S&T [Science & Technology] Directorate; that it will continue to operate, supporting both DNDO [the Domestic Nuclear Detection Office] and other DHS [Homeland Security] organizations; and that it will remain in its current location." Media coverage focused on the "incredible mismanagement" of the transition and the ultimate decision to keep the lab open.

=== National Urban Security Technology Laboratory ===
In 2009, the name of the lab was changed from the Environmental Measurements Laboratory to the National Urban Security Technology Laboratory. The lab continued to test and evaluate technologies and systems addressing homeland security threats, and helped the Tri-State homeland security community.

In an interview published in 2011, laboratory director Adam Hutter said the lab is "the last remaining federal facility from the Manhattan Project which is still located in Manhattan."

An article in the scientific journal Health Physics was published in 2018 titled: "Sidekicks to the Heroes: How Science and Technology Support First Responders (And How You Can Too)" details the history and current work of NUSTL.

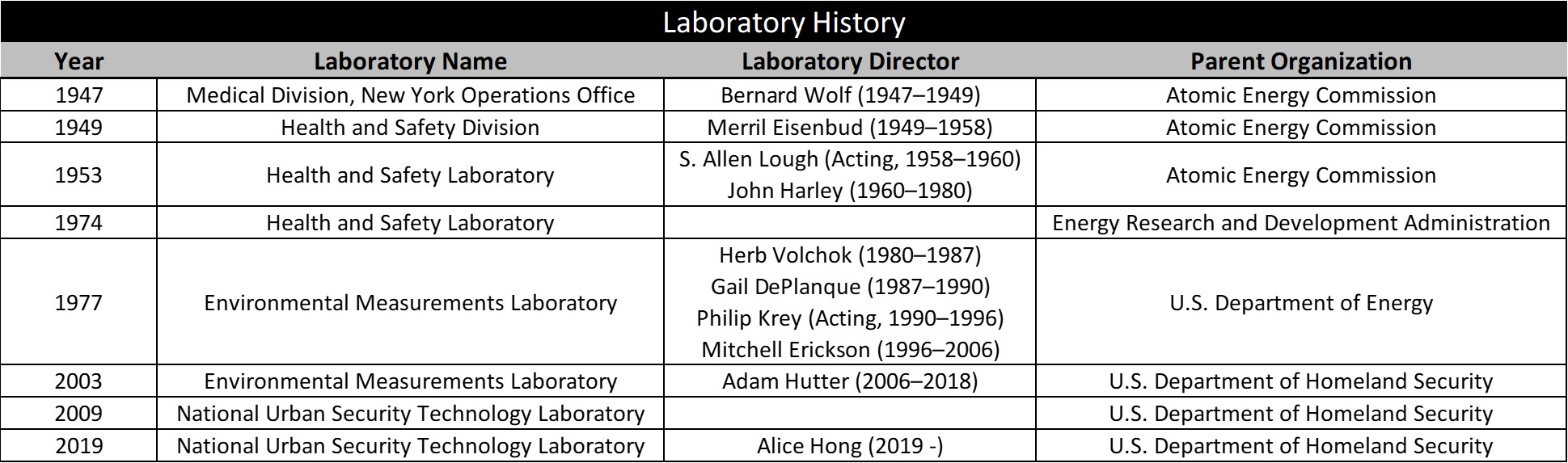
Table of HASL, EML, and NUSTL organization history

== Current work ==
According to proposed Congressional authorization, "as a DHS S&T federal laboratory, NUSTL conducts research, development, testing and evaluation in order to better understand and mitigate current and future homeland security threats. The NUSTL pilot deployment programs not only transition homeland security technologies from the developing and testing phases to operational field trials, but also provide a critical scientific interface with NYPD, FDNY, New York, New Jersey, and Connecticut state police, and a myriad of other local end-users in the field."

The laboratory directly supports first responders by testing, evaluating and assessing technologies and systems for counterterrorism, preparedness, response and recovery. Some of this work includes the System Assessment and Validation for Emergency Responders (SAVER) Program. and a Radiological Emergency Management System.

The laboratory houses the New York Area Science and Technology Forum, which is a consortium of federal, state and local government organizations and private sector groups that meet regularly to discuss advances in science and technology applications.

The National Urban Security Technology Laboratory runs operational experimentation events which are intended "to create a forum where end-users can evaluate emerging technologies in realistic scenarios in an operational urban setting."

According to a press release in 2017, "The labs strategic location in New York City allows for innovative systems and technologies to be tested by local first responders before being implemented on a national scale."

=== National Urban Security Technology Laboratory receives first patent issued to the Department of Homeland Security ===
The National Urban Security Technology Laboratory is the first organization within the Department of Homeland Security to be awarded a U.S. patent for an invention conceived by its employees.

According to the press release and media coverage of the patent # 7781747 entitled "Very thin dosimeter filters and low profile dosimeter incorporating the same," dubbed the Citizen's Dosimeter, this high-tech plastic card would be as convenient and affordable as a subway card, with the capability to measure the amount of radiation on a person or in a given area.

== New Facility ==
As reported by Government Security News, the laboratory celebrated its re-location on February 27, 2013 with a ribbon-cutting ceremony. More than one hundred representatives from the laboratory, the Department of Homeland Security, the New York Police and Fire departments, various technology labs, and longtime friends attended the ceremony. Speakers at the ceremony included Dr. Daniel Gerstein, the Deputy Under Secretary for Science & Technology at the Department of Homeland Security, Richard Daddario, the Deputy Commissioner of Counterterrorism at the New York Police Department, Edward Kilduff, the Chief of Department for the Fire Department of New York, and Dr. Adam Hutter, the laboratory director.

According to a Fox News report on the event, in a massive departure from the lab of the past half a century, the modern lab was designed with collaboration in mind to bring together sponsors, developers and first responders who will use the technology. "There is great need to apply tech tools in the field," the New York Police Department's Richard Daddario told FoxNews.com. "NUSTL provides an opportunity to bring us together on important tech issues." "We can better protect people by partnering with Feds and others … NUSTL is critical," Kilduff told FoxNews.com. "The NUSTL is an invaluable resource within the Homeland Security Enterprise," said Dr. Daniel Gerstein, DHS Deputy Under Secretary for Science and Technology. "This new lab is at the core of producing new and innovative solutions with improved collaboration, increased training, and upgraded scientific capabilities to make our nation more safe, secure and resilient."

== 2018 Potential Closure ==
The Presidential Budget Request for fiscal year 2018 proposes the closure of the laboratory NUSTL after 70 years of serving the security of the nation through various scientific and technology endeavors. According to the justification, "NUSTL works with end users in the lab and field to promote successful deployment of both commercial and emerging technologies. NUSTL's activities emphasize testing and evaluation alongside responders in operational scenarios, assisting with fielding of technologies, sponsoring R&D, supporting the development of Concept of Operations documents and providing post-deployment advisory support. NUSTL is the only lab entirely focused on first responders and enabling their mission effectiveness."

In addition to NUSTL, Science & Technology also is planning to close two other Department of Homeland Security laboratories – the Chemical Security Analysis Center and the National Biodefense Analysis and Countermeasures Center. Many questions have been raised over the justification for closing unique and valuable laboratories that focus on detecting and mitigating terrorist threats via weapons of mass destruction (chemical, biological, radiological, and nuclear) to help protect the American public. Regarding the potential closure, as cited in an article in the Chief Leader, one expert from John Jay College remarked "This is really unfortunate...in the age where we have to worry about dirty bombs." These potential closures are "...part of a greater budgetary assault on science that will directly impact our ability to detect and respond to acts of terrorism."

== Efforts to Maintain NUSTL's Long-Term Stability ==
In response to the administration's plans to close the lab, advocates to keep it open have made their voices heard. Congressman Dan Donovan (NY-11) introduced amendment to an appropriations Bill to restore funding which passed the U.S. House of Representatives. In the press release about the amendment, Congressman Donovan stated: "NUSTL is constantly developing and testing new tools that ensure the brave men and women on our front lines can protect our homeland, and it's critical they have resources to continue their innovative work." New York City Fire Commissioner Daniel Nigro stated that "Closing NUSTL would negatively affect preparedness and response planning for terrorist incidents, industrial accidents, and routine emergencies." During testimony to the Subcommittee on Emergency Preparedness, Response and Communications (Committee on Homeland Security), Chief Timothy Rice of the New York City Fire Department stated that NUSTL has "strengthened the department's ability to save life and property and ultimately make the people of New York and millions of visitors to the region safer each day."

The New York Times published an article on the potential closure of the lab citing concerns being raised that closing the lab "could hamper efforts to prevent and respond to terrorist attacks." Another article states that "closing Homeland Security laboratories ... puts lives in danger." The NYTimes article states that "law enforcement and emergency management officials in New York and New Jersey, as well as members of Congress from both parties, said they were concerned about the potential loss of a Homeland Security research lab in a city that remains a top target for terrorists." Specifically, they raised issues that the laboratory's work had saved communities millions of dollars in research costs and that other labs could not easily take over its work. Mr. Charles Jennings, a professor at John Jay College in New York who directs the Christian Regenhard Center for Emergency Response Studies. "It's hard to overstate the importance of what they do. Although it's based here in New York, its impact is nationwide. It's a service you just can't get anywhere else." Furthermore, the laboratory's impact and value justify the lab's budget and closing the lab would be detrimental to the first responder community, with Senator Richard Blumenthal stating "It's less than a pittance in the federal budget...It's not even a fraction of a rounding error and has broad ramifications and impact on the law enforcement community."

On March 23, 2018, H.R.1625, the Consolidated Appropriations Act, 2018 was enacted that "...fully restores funding for laboratories proposed for closure, including ... the National Biodefense Analysis and Countermeasures Center (NBACC), the Chemical Security Analysis Center (CSAC), and the National Urban Security Technology Laboratory (NUSTL)." This funding counters the myopic decision-making of the DHS/Science & Technology Directorate that took nearly two years to rectify, but for which lasting impacts remain.

To address future stability of NUSTL's critical role to national security, on June 19, 2018, the 115th Congress US House of Representatives passed H.R.4991 - Supporting Research and Development for First Responders Act. Sponsored by Rep. Dan Donovan [R-NY], Rep. Kathleen Rice [D-NY], Rep. Peter King [R-NY], Rep. Mark Meadows [R-NC], the Bill authorizes NUSTL "...to test and evaluate emerging technologies and conduct research and development to assist emergency response providers in preparing for, and protecting against, threats of terrorism" and establishes that NUSTL shall:

“(1) conduct tests, evaluations, and assessments of current and emerging technologies, including, as appropriate, cybersecurity of such technologies that can connect to the internet, for emergency response providers; “(2) conduct research and development on radiological and nuclear response and recovery; “(3) act as a technical advisor to emergency response providers; and “(4) carry out other such activities as the Secretary determines appropriate.”

The bill was received in the Senate, read twice and referred to the Committee on Homeland Security and Governmental Affairs.

Representative Kathleen Rice (D-NY) reintroduced the measure in the 116th Congress with Representative Peter King (R-NY) to authorize NUSTL, H.R. 542, to amend the Homeland Security Act of 2002 authorizing NUSTL. The overwhelming bipartisan support for the lab was apparent in the House vote 395-3.

The efforts to fund and authorize NUSTL was done in a bipartisan fashion, pointing to the inane decision of DHS S&T to try to close the lab. In a speech on the House floor to pass HR 4991, Congressman Dan Donovan (R-NY), stated "NUSTL has been a critical resource in protecting our homeland since 1947. Today, NUSTL is one of its kind test and evaluation laboratory for the first responders community..." further adding that "H.R. 4991 will ensure that the valuable work being done at NUSTL will continue for years to come." Congressman Jim Langevin (D-RI) stated: "The elimination of this laboratory as a first responder resource is absolutely senseless... The importance of this lab to national security cannot be overstated."

Despite the groundswell of political and partner support to keep the lab open, the Presidential Budget Request for FY2020 again did not include funding for NUSTL. However, efforts have again been made by Congress and many partners to fund the laboratory for its unique and important mission for first responders. For example, Jeff Schlegelmilch, the deputy director of the National Center for Disaster Preparedness at Columbia University's Earth Institute was quoted in a recent CNN article that "Removing that capability in any sort of unplanned way is going to cause trauma and potential vulnerabilities."

== Authorization by Congress ==
On December 21, 2021 President Biden signed S.1605 the National Defense Authorization Act for 2022. In section SEC. 6406. NATIONAL URBAN SECURITY TECHNOLOGY LABORATORY of the S.1605, Title III of the Homeland Security Act of 2002 (6 U.S.C. 181 et seq.) is amended by adding at the end the following new section: SEC. 322. NATIONAL URBAN SECURITY TECHNOLOGY LABORATORY. Specifically, the law enacts NUSTL to: (1) conduct tests, evaluations, and assessments of current and emerging technologies, including, as appropriate, the cybersecurity of such technologies that can connect to the internet, for emergency response providers; (2) act as a technical advisor to emergency response providers; and (3) carry out other such activities as the Secretary determines appropriate.

This new law authorizes NUSTL as a permanent laboratory in DHS/S&T for which any changes will need Congressional approval, such that unilateral decisions to close the lab as has previously been attempted will need Congressional approval.

The authorization is a historic moment for NUSTL because it demonstrates a bi-partisan commitment to and appreciation for NUSTL’s mission and its enduring role serving first responders as they support homeland security activities.
