= Open Solutions Alliance =

The Open Solutions Alliance (OSA) is a trade association. The OSA works with ISVs, system integrators, and the broader open source software community to improve interoperability among software products by publishing best practices, promoting technical standards, and making tools and application programming interfaces available.

== History ==
In early November 2006, a group of application developers got together to form an alliance dedicated to improving interoperability and awareness of their products. Open source development had proven itself at the operating system and middleware layers but had yet to make a significant impact at the application level. Founders identified three important areas where collective action could be successful in lowering barriers to adoption of open solutions by business users:

- Define and promote guidelines and best practices for interoperability between applications.
- Foster a multivendor metacommunity of users, developers, and systems integrators.
- Drive awareness and advocacy

All of those present agreed that none of these challenges could be readily addressed by any one vendor in isolation. Issues of awareness, interoperability and community are inherently collective in nature, such that collective action is needed to address them. This led to the decision to create a trade association. The result was the OSA.

In December 2006, The Open Solutions Alliance was incorporated as a 501c6 in the State of California, and the initial founding members officially joined during January 2007.

== Members ==
Notable members of OSA include Palamida, CSC, Concursive Corporation, Essentia Corporation, Ingres Corporation, IONA, Jaspersoft, Openbravo, SourceForge.net, and Unisys.
