= DBT Online Inc. =

- Industry: Business intelligence
- Founded: 1992; 33 years ago in Las Vegas, Nevada, United States
- Founders: Roy Brubaker, Hank Asher
- Headquarters: Las Cruces, New Mexico, United States
- Number of employees: 399

DBT Online Inc., formerly known as Database Technologies, is a data mining company founded by Roy Brubaker and Hank Asher in 1992 in Las Vegas, Nevada, USA. It is today a subsidiary of US data aggregation group, ChoicePoint.

DBT Online was formed as a public holding company by the merger of Database Technologies and Patlex in 1996.

DBT Online bought Asher out for US$147 million in 1999. This followed the FBI and the Drug Enforcement Administration suspending their contracts with DBT Online following revelations that Asher had been involved but not charged with drug dealing in the Bahamas. The agencies were also concerned that DBT Online could potentially monitor targets of investigations.

Asher blamed the ouster on fellow company director Kenneth Langone.

In early 2000 soon after Hank Asher's departure, DBT won a $4 million contract with the state of Florida that would mire it in the Florida Election Controversy in the 2000 US presidential elections.

DBT competes with Seisint, a company founded by Asher on his departure from Database Technologies. Seisint was sold to LexisNexis in 2004 for $775 million.
