= Wedge: The Secret War Between the FBI and CIA =

1994 science book by Mark Riebling

Wedge: The Secret War between the FBI and CIA
- Cover for the 2004 paperback edition
- Author: Mark Riebling
- Cover artist: Chip Kidd (hardcover first edition)
- Language: English
- Genre: Nonfiction > Political Science > United States > Espionage
- Publisher: Alfred A. Knopf
- Publication date: October 18, 1994; 32 years ago
- Publication place: New York City
- Media type: Print (hardback & paperback)
- Pages: 563 pages
- ISBN: 978-0-679-41471-1
- OCLC: 29478703
- Dewey Decimal: 327.1273/009/045 20
- LC Class: JK468.I6 R56 2002

Wedge: The Secret War Between the FBI and CIA, a nonfiction book by American historian and policy analyst Mark Riebling, explores the conflict between U.S. domestic law enforcement and foreign intelligence. The book presents FBI–CIA rivalry through the prism of national traumas—including the Kennedy assassination, Watergate, and 9/11—and argues that the agencies' failure to cooperate has seriously endangered U.S. national security.

== Theme: conflicting personalities, missions, cultures ==
Riebling argues that relations have always been tense, dating back to the relationship between the two giants of American intelligence—Director J. Edgar Hoover of the FBI and Director William Donovan of World War II's Office of Strategic Services (the forerunner of the CIA). Wedge traces many of the problems to differing personalities, missions, and corporate cultures. Donovan had been in combat in World War I, while Hoover was building the FBI Indexes at the GID. Donovan argued against the constitutionality of Hoover's GID activities in the 1920s. In World War II, President Franklin D. Roosevelt (at the demand of the British, including Ian Fleming), allowed the creation of a new intelligence agency, against the wishes of FBI director J. Edgar Hoover. He put Donovan in charge. The intelligence failure of the FBI (i.e. regarding Dusko Popov) leading to the attack on Pearl Harbor helped convince government leaders of the necessity of a 'centralized' intelligence group.

Donovan's new group accepted communist agents and the alliance with the Soviets, while Hoover (informed by his experiences in the First Red Scare period) was abhorred at the thought and believed the Soviet empire would become the 'next enemy' after World War II was over. The CIA evolved from freewheeling World War II foreign operations, hiring known criminals and foreign agents of questionable moral character. Donovan operated with a flat, non-existent hierarchy. The FBI in contrast focused on the building of legal cases to be presented in the US court system, and the punishment of criminals, and demanded 'clean living' agents who would act in strict obedience to Hoover's dictates.

== Personalities profiled ==
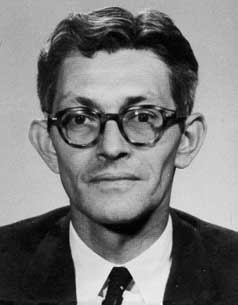
James Jesus Angleton.

=== CIA Counterintelligence Chief James Jesus Angleton ===
Scott Ladd wrote in Newsday, "If a heroic figure emerges from Wedge it is the late James Jesus Angleton, the CIA's controversial director of counterintelligence for more than 20 years. Riebling partially rehabilitates Angleton from the drubbing he's taken in recent books such as David Wise's Molehunt, in which he is depicted as disrupting his own agency in a futile, paranoid search for a nonexistent mole." A Namebase reviewer finds that "Riebling explains the Angleton view so competently that it finally makes sense on its own terms."

=== FBI Director J. Edgar Hoover ===
Ladd asserts that Riebling "avoided tarring the late FBI boss with the kind of sensationalist touches common to recent biographies. ... [Riebling] is respectful of those he believes played the game both wisely and well."

=== KGB defector Anatoliy Golitsyn ===
In his 1984 book New Lies For Old, Soviet KGB defector Anatoliy Golitsyn predicted the fall of the Berlin Wall, the collapse of the Soviet empire, and the rise of a democratic regime in Russia. Riebling calculated that of Golitysn's 194 original predictions, 139 were fulfilled by 1994, while 9 seemed 'clearly wrong', and the other 46 were "not soon falsifiable"—an accuracy rate of 94%. Riebling suggested that this predictive record (and the rise of KGB officer Vladimir Putin) justified re-evaluation of Golitysn's background theory, which posited a KGB role in "top-down" liberalization and reform. Golitysn quoted Riebling's assessment in a January 1995 memo to the Director of the CIA.

== Operations and controversies spotlighted ==
=== Probe of the John F. Kennedy assassination ===
Riebling devotes considerable attention to the assassination of John F. Kennedy. His take is that "liaison problems" between the FBI and the CIA "contributed" to the Dallas tragedy, impeded the investigation and led to a "fight that precluded the truth from being inarguably known." When the Warren Commission issued its conclusions on the murder in 1964, it concealed "indications of a Communist role" because of an interagency conflict over the bona fides of the Soviet defector Yuri Nosenko, who insisted that Moscow had nothing to do with the crime. The FBI thought Nosenko was telling the truth; the CIA was sure he was lying to protect Moscow. Riebling writes that the Warren Commission's "obvious delinquencies and cover-ups would later lead conspiracy theorists to suspect Government complicity in the assassination."

=== Dispute over KGB defector Yuri Nosenko ===
Wedge describes the divisiveness caused by the FBI's championship of Nosenko, versus the CIA's support for the Soviet defector Golitsyn, who accused Mr. Nosenko of being a Kremlin plant. In 1970 the Nosenko-Golitsyn conflict "reached a point of crisis." Calling on Richard Nixon in Florida, J. Edgar Hoover asked the President how he liked the reports obtained by the FBI from Oleg Lyalin, a KGB man in London. Nixon said he had never received them. Furious, Hoover learned that Angleton acting on advice from Golitsyn, had withheld them from the President as disinformation. "If Lyalin had been the first such source to be knocked down by Golitsin," Riebling writes, "Hoover might have been able to tolerate Angleton's skepticism. But coming at the end of a decade which had seen CIA disparage a whole series of FBI sources, the Lyalin affair turned Hoover irrevocably against Angleton and Golitsyn."

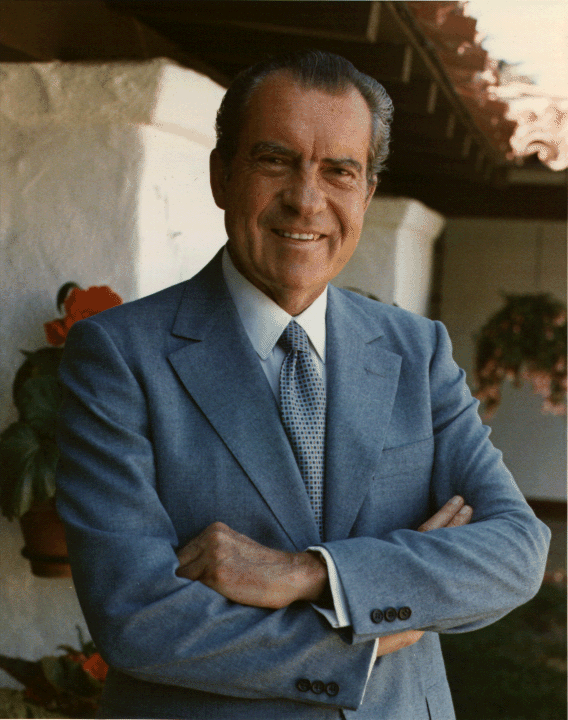
Richard M. Nixon.

=== Watergate and the crisis in domestic surveillance under Richard Nixon ===
Emboldened by the knowledge that his personal relationship with Nixon was far warmer than that of Richard Helms, the Lyndon Johnson-appointed Director of Central Intelligence, Hoover proceeded to break off direct contact with the CIA. Later, when the agency sent him requests for information, he would curse the CIA and say, "Let them do their own work!"

Yet despite his ties to Hoover, Nixon privately felt, in the words of his chief of staff, H. R. Haldeman, that "the FBI was a failure; it hadn't found Communist backing for the antiwar organizations, which he was sure was there." As Riebling writes, the Nixon White House quietly encouraged the two agencies to encroach on each other's territory, and it established the notorious rump group known as the White House Plumbers, whose key operatives came from both the FBI and the CIA.

Nixon's conspiratorial mind-set, combined with his want to exploit the two agencies for his own political purposes, led naturally to the President's effort to enlist both in the Watergate cover-up, which was strenuously opposed by Helms. Hoover had died in 1972, but Riebling believes that had he been alive, the FBI Director would have responded the same way as Helms. Riebling writes that "no one ever doubted" that Hoover "would have refused to let CIA or the White House, tell the bureau how to conduct a criminal investigation. The Watergate cover-up, even his most severe detractors would admit, could not have happened on Hoover's watch."

=== Analysis of 9/11 intelligence failures ===
In the epilogue to the paperback edition, Riebling argues that the Aldrich Ames and Robert Hanssen spy cases further soured relations, resulting in liaison problems that contributed to the intelligence failures of 9/11. Riebling's account of interagency counter-terrorism efforts before September 11, 2001, highlights ten instances in which he believes the national security establishment failed along the faultline of law enforcement and intelligence.

== Reception and influence ==
=== Critical reception ===
See more excerpts from reviews at wikiquote

- Reviewing the hardcover edition in The New York Times Book Review, presidential historian Michael R. Besschloss wrote: "Wedge compellingly re-creates the life-or-death atmosphere of the half-century of American confrontation with the Soviet Union. Mr. Riebling succeeds brilliantly as well in persuading the reader that the FBI-CIA conflict was a more important piece of the cold war mosaic than heretofore noted by historians." To Besschloss, however, the relevance of the work remained somewhat elusive: "Vital controversies over Soviet moles and counterintelligence, which seemed so dramatic just a few years ago, have a vaguely antique quality now that the Soviet Union is dead, recalling Norma Desmond's lament in Sunset Boulevard that she remained big, it was merely the pictures that had got small."
- Reviewing Wedge on the front page of the Washington Post Book World, Richard Gid Powers, found Wedge "a lively and engaging narrative of interagency bungling, infighting, malfeasance and nonfeasance, providing fresh and well-rounded portraits of well-known (and ought-to-be-well-known) agents, based on scores of original and rewarding interviews."
- John Fialka wrote in the Wall Street Journal: "The fact that [Riebling] has taken great pains to avoid using anonymous sources is just one of a number of reasons why serious students of this nation's haywire-rigged counterintelligence effort should read Wedge. ... [T]he cumulative effect of his tales is staggering."
- Writing in Reason, Michael W. Lynch criticizes Riebling from a libertarian perspective, alleging that his arguments have been used to broaden the FBI's ability to collect political information on Americans and people living in the United States.
- Some 9/11 "Truthers" contend that Riebling provided the "cover story" for an alleged U.S. government conspiracy behind the events of September 11, 2001. Thus one blogger "take[s] a shot at The Nation for its embrace of a disingenuous book by Mark Riebling," alleging that U.S. Deputy Attorney General and 9/11 Commission member "Jamie Gorelick, who learned so much from this book," adapted Riebling's concept of a "tragic wedge" into the 9/11 Commission's criticism of a "wall between the CIA and FBI."
- In October 2002, Vernon Loeb wrote in The Washington Post, "If Riebling's thesis—that the FBI–CIA rivalry had 'damaged the national security and, to that extent, imperiled the Republic'—was provocative at the time, [but] seems prescient now, with missed communications between the two agencies looming as the principal cause of intelligence failures related to the Sept. 11, 2001, terrorist attacks."

=== Influence on U.S. national security policy ===
- Andrew C. McCarthy, the deputy U.S. attorney who prosecuted the first World Trade Center bombers in 1993, wrote in The Wall Street Journal in 2006 that "Riebling's analysis has now become conventional wisdom, accepted on all sides. Such, indeed, is the reasoning behind virtually all of the proposals now under consideration by no fewer than seven assorted congressional committees, internal evaluators, and blue-ribbon panels charged with remedying the intelligence situation."
- In his January 28, 2003 State of the Union Address, President George W. Bush announced an initiative to close what he termed the "seam" between FBI and CIA coverage of foreign threats, as Riebling recommended in Wedge.

=== Influence on public discourse and academic scholarship ===
- In Remaking Domestic Intelligence, Judge Richard A. Posner develops Riebling's proposal for a new domestic intelligence service based on the model of Britain's MI5.
- Glenn P. Hastedt writes in Espionage: A Reference Handbook that "Riebling's concern for the rivalry and competitive nature of the relationship between the intelligence community is frequently commented upon in studies of intelligence estimates."
- Writing in Reason, Michael W. Lynch criticized Riebling from a libertarian perspective, alleging others have used his arguments to broaden the FBI's ability to collect intelligence.
- Maureen Dowd discussed Wedge, and the problem of FBI–CIA rivalry, in "Wedge on the Potomac" a June 5, 2002 column in The New York Times.

== Reviews and discussions ==
- Besschloss, Michael R. "Such Bad Friends." The New York Times, November 6, 1994
- Dowd, Maureen. "Wedge on the Potomac." The New York Times, June 5, 2002
- Lathrop, Charles. The Literary Spy: The Ultimate source for Quotations on Espionage & Intelligence. Yale University Press, 2004.
- Loeb, Vernon. "From the 'Hanssen Effect' to Sept. 11," The Washington Post, October 21, 2002
- McCarthy, Andrew C. "The Intelligence Mess." The Wall Street Journal, September 20, 2006
- Golitsyn, Anatoliy. "Destruction through KGB Penetration of the Central Intelligence Agency." Memorandum to Admiral William O. Studeman, Acting Director, Central Intelligence Agency, February 1, 1995, reprinted in Golitsyn, The Perestroika Deception, Pelican Books, 1998, pp. 221ff
- "Intelligence Experts Looking at Ways to Make Changes to the Intelligence community," National Public Radio, June 4, 2004
- "Failure of FBI to Develop and Share Intelligence Sources Prior to 9/11," National Public Radio (NPR), April 12, 2004
- "President Bush's Plan for Improving the Sharing of Surveillance among Federal Agencies," National Public Radio, January 30, 2003
- "Senate Intelligence Committee makes Recommendations for Improving US Domestic Intelligence Procedures," National Public Radio, December 12, 2002
- Kenneth Jost, "Re-examining 9/11: Could the Terrorist Attacks Have Been Prevented?" Congressional Quarterly Researcher, June 4, 2004
- Vernon Loeb, "From the 'Hanssen Effect' to Sept. 11," The Washington Post, October 21, 2002.
- Charles F. Parker and Eric K. Stern, "Bolt from the Blue or Avoidable Failure? Revisiting September 11 and the Origins of Strategic Surprise," Foreign Policy Analysis, Volume 1, Issue 3 (2005).

== Bibliography ==
- Wedge: The Secret War between the FBI and CIA. Alfred A. Knopf, 1994
- Wedge: From Pearl Harbor to 9/11—How the Secret War between the FBI and CIA Has Endangered National Security. Simon and Schuster, 2002
