= Ken Langone =

American businessman

- Born: Kenneth Gerard Langone; September 16, 1935 (age 91); Roslyn Heights, New York, U.S.
- Education: Bucknell University (BA); New York University (MBA)
- Political party: Republican
- Spouse: Elaine Langone
- Children: 3

Kenneth Gerard Langone Sr. KSG (born September 16, 1935) is an American billionaire businessman best known for organizing financing for the founders of The Home Depot. He is a major donor to the Republican Party.

== Early life ==
Langone was born in Roslyn Heights, New York, to Italian American parents. His father was a plumber and his mother a cafeteria worker. He was a student at Bucknell University and the New York University Stern School of Business.

== Business career ==
In the early 1960s, Langone began his career at a Wall Street financial services company named R.W. Pressprich, where he helped develop new business. In 1968 Langone met and persuaded Ross Perot to let Pressprich handle Electronic Data Systems's IPO. In 1969, Langone was named Pressprich's president.

In 1974, Langone formed the venture capital firm Invemed. Langone organized financing for Bernard Marcus and Arthur Blank to found Home Depot. Now an international chain with over 450,000 employees, it is Langone's most notable business venture.

Langone was a member of the board of directors of General Electric from 1999 to 2005. He defended Jack Welch's tenure as chief executive of GE, blaming Welch's successors for the company's steep decline.

Langone was a member of the boards of Geeknet, Database Technologies, ChoicePoint Inc., Unifi, and Yum! Brands, Inc.

Langone was chairman of the New York Stock Exchange's Compensation Committee from 1999 to 2003. In 2004, New York Attorney General Eliot Spitzer filed a lawsuit against the New York Stock Exchange's former Chairman Richard Grasso to return $100 million to the NYSE that were part of his $139.5 million pay package. The lawsuit named Langone, who had approved the pay package. Langone denied that the pay packages were illegal considering that the NYSE had direct knowledge of the board's decision. On July 1, 2008, the New York State Court of Appeals dismissed all claims against Grasso because the NYSE had changed its status from a nonprofit to a for-profit organization, which meant that the Attorney General had lost standing to sue Grasso.

According to Forbes magazine, Langone's net worth as of 2026 is approximately $10.3 billion.

== Political involvement and campaign donations ==
Langone is a major donor to the Republican Party. He describes himself as a "loyal, enthusiastic Republican" and opposes single-payer healthcare, free college tuition, and guaranteed minimum income, deeming these policies to be a form of "socialism."

A friend of Ross Perot, Langone was part of the "Business Brigade" of executives who supported Perot's 1992 presidential campaign and he was an advisor to the Perot campaign. He donated hundreds of thousands of dollars to the Republican National Committee and to Republican-aligned outside spending groups, such as Karl Rove's American Crossroads super PAC, and Norm Coleman's dark money group, the American Action Network. In 2008, Langone supported Rudy Giuliani's presidential bid, and was a bundler for the Giuliani's campaign.

Langone heavily donated to efforts to defeat Barack Obama in the 2012 presidential election. He led an effort by a group of wealthy Republican donors to draft Chris Christie to run; when he declined, Langone backed Mitt Romney. He criticized the Affordable Care Act championed by Obama, although he was also critical of Republican congressional leadership for triggering a government shutdown in an effort to block the ACA. In 2014, Langone likened populist appeals to raise taxes on the rich in the United States to Hitler's rhetoric in Nazi Germany in the 1930s. In July 2022, Langone helped found a group of U.S. business and policy leaders who share the goal of constructively engaging with China in order to improve U.S.-China relations.

Langone initially endorsed Christie's campaign for the 2016 Republican presidential nomination; in early 2015, he donated $250,000 to a pro-Christie super PAC, but made no major further financial contributions to support Christie's campaign, and praised Donald Trump as "a very significant positive factor." After Christie dropped out of the race, Langone shifted his support to John Kasich. He also later donated to Donald Trump's 2016 presidential campaign. In 2019, Langone praised Trump for raising tariffs on China. In 2017, following the deadly far-right rally in Charlottesville, Virginia, Langone said Trump “completely mishandled the situation in Charlottesville" but continued to support Trump's economic policies. On January 13, 2021, days after the January 6 attack against the U.S. Capitol, Langone said he felt "betrayed" by Trump's actions during the assault. He nevertheless continued to back Trump after the Capitol attack, and contributed $1 million to a fund working to defeat Democratic senators and $500,000 to Americans for Prosperity, the Koch family-backed group.

In December 2023, Langone endorsed Nikki Haley's campaign for the 2024 Republican presidential nomination, and became a major donor to a super PAC supporting Haley. However, after the January 2024 Iowa caucuses, Langone said he would withhold further major financial support for Haley's candidacy unless she had a strong showing in the New Hampshire primary, and said that he believed Trump would likely win the nomination. He said he would "probably" vote for Trump if he were the Republican Party's nominee.

== Personal life ==
He and his wife Elaine Langone have three children; Kenneth G. Jr., Stephen, and Bruce Langone. He lives in Sands Point, New York. He has lived on Elderfields Road in nearby Flower Hill, and has maintained a winter home in North Palm Beach, Florida.

Langone is a devout Catholic who has financially contributed to the church and sat on the board of St. Patrick's Cathedral. He was made a knight of the Order of St. Gregory the Great by Pope Benedict XVI. He has been critical of Benedict's successor, Pope Francis, taking issue with Francis's statements (for example, in the apostolic exhortation Evangelii gaudium) condemning the indifference of the prosperous toward the poor.

=== Philanthropy ===
Langone and his wife were early signatories to The Giving Pledge.

Langone has donated $300 million to the NYU School of Medicine and NYU Medical Center (later named NYU Langone Health in his honor); this includes a $100 million pledge in 2018 toward a $450 million program to make tuition free for all medical students at the NYU School of Medicine. Langone has been a member of the boards of trustees of NYU Langone Health, the Harlem Children's Zone, the Robin Hood Foundation, and the Center for Strategic and International Studies. He was a member of the Bucknell University board of trustees from 1981 to 1996; he and his wife gave $11 million to the university in 1999, to fund a new athletics center, and approximately $42 million to the university between 2013 and 2017.

In 2019, he donated over $5 million to the Animal Medical Center in New York City.

=== Awards and honors ===
In 2024, Langone received the Golden Plate Award of the American Academy of Achievement.

=== In popular media ===
Langone is portrayed by actor Ray Iannicelli in the 2017 HBO Films production The Wizard of Lies. A scene in the film portrays a real-life event in which Langone rejected a fraudulent investment offer by Wall Street swindler Bernie Madoff several weeks before his arrest.

Langone is extensively featured in the documentary Client 9: The Rise and Fall of Eliot Spitzer where he discusses his fierce rivalry with former New York Governor Eliot Spitzer.
