= Mark Riebling =

American author (born 1963)

- Born: 1963 (age 62–63)
- Education: Dartmouth College; University of California, Berkeley; Columbia University
- Occupation: Writer
- Writing career
- Notable works: Church of Spies: The Pope's Secret War Against Hitler; Wedge - The Secret War between the FBI and CIA

Mark Riebling (born 1963) is an American author. He has written two books: Wedge: The Secret War between the FBI and CIA and Church of Spies: The Pope's Secret War Against Hitler.

== Education ==
Riebling did graduate work in political philosophy at Columbia University, studied English at Dartmouth College, and majored in philosophy at the University of California at Berkeley.

== Career ==
From 2001 to 2010 Riebling served as editorial director at the Manhattan Institute and directed its book program. Previously he had worked as a book editor in the Adult Trade Division at Random House.

From 2002 to 2006 Riebling served as Research Director for the Center for Policing Terrorism, which partnered with LAPD Chief William Bratton to create and administer the National Counter Terrorism Academy. The center also reportedly provided analytical support to NYPD Deputy Commissioner David Cohen, a former CIA Deputy Director for Operations. In his 2008 book, Crush the Cell, NYPD Deputy Commissioner for Counter Terrorism Michael A. Sheehan wrote that the center "provided a team of intelligence analysts that supported our work with timely and accurate reports on fast-breaking issues".

== Influence ==
Riebling's analysis of security failures influenced post-911 intelligence reforms. Andrew C. McCarthy, the deputy U.S. attorney who prosecuted the 1993 World Trade Center bombing, wrote in The Wall Street Journal in 2006 that "Riebling's analysis has now become conventional wisdom, accepted on all sides. Such, indeed, is the reasoning behind virtually all of the proposals now under consideration by no fewer than seven assorted congressional committees, internal evaluators, and blue-ribbon panels charged with remedying the intelligence situation."

== Wedge: From Pearl Harbor to 9/11 ==
Wedge (Knopf, 1994; Simon & Schuster, 2002) traces the conflict between U.S. law enforcement and intelligence, from World War II through the war on terror. Using documents obtained under the Freedom of Information Act and interviews with former agents, Riebling presents FBI–CIA rivalry through the prism of national traumas—including the Kennedy assassination, Watergate, and 9/11—and argues that the agencies' failure to cooperate has seriously endangered U.S. national security.

Wedge traces many of the problems to differing personalities, missions, and corporate cultures: while the CIA evolved from freewheeling foreign operations, the FBI focused on domestic security and the punishment of criminals.

Discussing the paperback edition in The Washington Post, Vernon Loeb wrote: "If Riebling's thesis--that the FBI–CIA rivalry had 'damaged the national security and, to that extent, imperiled the Republic'--was provocative at the time, it seems prescient now, with missed communications between the two agencies looming as the principal cause of intelligence failures related to the Sept. 11, 2001, terrorist attacks."

== Church of Spies: The Pope's Secret War Against Hitler ==
Church of Spies (2016) details the Catholic Church's role in World War II. While it is often accused of colluding with Germany and being complicit in the Holocaust, Riebling argues that the Church was merely pretending to be supportive of Germany to avoid being the target of the latter's aggression. In fact, he claims Pope Pius XII was secretly organizing an espionage operation with the Allied Powers against the Nazis. Kirkus Reviews characterized Church of Spies as "Not only a dramatic disclosure of the Vatican's covert actions, but also an absorbing, polished story for all readers of World War II history."
