= Concursive =

American software company

- Industry: Software
- Founded: 2000
- Headquarters: Norfolk, Virginia
- Products: customer relationship management application ConcourseConnect
- Website: www.concursive.com

Concursive, until October 2007 named Centric CRM, is a software company located in Norfolk, Virginia, that offers the ConcourseSuite product, a customer relationship management application, and ConcourseConnect, a social software application, both based on Java/J2EE. Concursive supplies products under a software as a service (SaaS) model or a license model.

The company was founded in 2000. It competes with major CRM vendors such as Salesforce.com, RightNow Technologies and Oracle’s Siebel.

== History ==
In June 2007, the Open Source Initiative (OSI) president, Michael Tiemann announced plans to crack down on software vendors that claim to be open source without using an OSI-approved license. Although Concursive described their CRM product as "open source", as of July 2007 it was not certified as such by the OSI. However, Concursive quickly announced that they were releasing their Team Elements software components under Larry Rosen's Open Software License.

In August 2007, the company announced a partnership with Loopfuse, a company that provides software to track and rate the activity of customers online, useful in scoring sales leads and rating / segmenting prospects.

In October 2007 the company released a new version of their CRM product with improved support for third party developers including a JSR 168 plug-in architecture. The company changed its name to "Concursive" and its product name to "ConcourseSuite" on 12 December 2007.
