= Regional Information Sharing Systems =

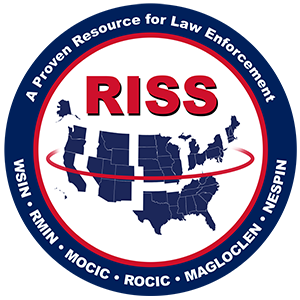

Agency overview
- Website: www.riss.net

Regional Information Sharing Systems (RISS) is an information-sharing program funded by the U.S. Federal government whose purpose is to connect databases from local and regional law enforcement so that they can use each other's data for criminal investigations.

In 1997, RISS created RISSNET, a network to interconnect many local, state, regional, and tribal law enforcement databases.

In 2002, RISSNET was connected with the FBI's Law Enforcement Online system.

In 2003, the National Criminal Intelligence Sharing Plan (NCISP) declared that RISSNET would be the official "backbone" for all unclassified, but sensitive criminal intelligence data traffic. Later that year, members were also given access to the Automated Trusted Information Exchange (ATIX) database, which contains information on homeland security and terrorist threats.

== RISS Centers ==
RISS is composed of six regional centers which serve law enforcement agencies in a number of US states and territories, as well as England, New Zealand, and Canada:

=== NESPIN — New England State Police Information Network ===
Established in 1979.

Located in Franklin, MA.

Serves:

- Connecticut
- Maine
- Massachusetts
- New Hampshire
- Rhode Island
- Vermont
- Parts of Canada

=== MAGLOCLEN — Middle Atlantic-Great Lakes Organized Crime Law Enforcement Network ===
Established in 1981.

Located in Newtown, PA.

Serves:

- Delaware
- Indiana
- Maryland
- Michigan
- New Jersey
- New York
- Ohio
- Pennsylvania
- The District of Columbia
- Canada
- England

=== MOCIC — Mid-States Organized Crime Information Center ===
Established in 1980.

Located in Springfield, MO.

Serves:

- Illinois
- Iowa
- Kansas
- Minnesota
- Missouri
- Nebraska
- North Dakota
- South Dakota
- Wisconsin
- Parts of Canada

=== ROCIC — Regional Organized Crime Information Center ===
Established in 1973.

Located in Nashville, TN.

Serves:

- Alabama
- Arkansas
- Florida
- Georgia
- Kentucky
- Louisiana
- Mississippi
- North Carolina
- Oklahoma
- South Carolina
- Tennessee
- Texas
- Virginia
- West Virginia
- Puerto Rico
- The U.S. Virgin Islands

=== RMIN — Rocky Mountain Information Network ===
Established in 1977.

Located in Phoenix, AZ.

Serves:

- Arizona
- Colorado
- Idaho
- Montana
- Nevada
- New Mexico
- Utah
- Wyoming
- Parts of Canada

=== WSIN — Western States Information Network ===
Established in 1980.

Located in Sacramento, CA.

Serves:

- Alaska
- California
- Hawaii
- Oregon
- Washington
- Canada
- Guam
- New Zealand

== See also ==
- Automated Trusted Information Exchange
- Joint Regional Information Exchange System
- Multistate Anti-Terrorism Information Exchange
