= DHS Science and Technology Directorate =

U.S. Department of Homeland Security research arm

Agency overview
- Formed: 2003
- Jurisdiction: United States
- Headquarters: Saint Elizabeth's Campus, Washington, D.C.
- Employees: 491 (2012)
- Annual budget: $0.8 billion (2012)
- Agency executive: Pedro M. Allende, Under Secretary
- Parent agency: Department of Homeland Security
- Website: www.dhs.gov/science-and-technology

The Science and Technology Directorate (S&T) is the research and development arm of the United States Department of Homeland Security.

The Science and Technology Directorate is led by the under secretary of homeland security for science and technology, who is appointed by the president of the United States with confirmation by the United States Senate.

== Initiatives and programs ==
The Under Secretary for Homeland Security Science and Technology currently administers a number of publicly available programs to promote independent development of homeland security technologies.

SAFECOM is the federal umbrella program designed to foster interoperability among the nation's public safety practitioners, so that they may communicate across disciplines and jurisdictions during an emergency.

The SAFETY Act provides liability protections that make it feasible for sellers of qualified antiterrorism technologies to introduce homeland security solutions to the marketplace.

Homeland Open Security Technology (HOST) is a five-year, $10 million program to promote the creation and use of open security and open-source software in the United States government and military. In October 2011, the directorate won the Open Source for America 2011 Government Deployment Open Source Award for the program.

Notable previous Under Secretaries include Dr. Tara O'Toole and Dr. Reginald Brothers.

The directorate's Office of National Laboratories operates six facilities:

- Chemical Security Analysis Center at the Aberdeen Proving Ground in Maryland
- National Biodefense Analysis and Countermeasures Center at Fort Detrick in Maryland
- National Urban Security Technology Laboratory in Manhattan, New York
- Transportation Security Laboratory in Atlantic City, New Jersey
- Plum Island Animal Disease Center near Orient, New York
- National Bio and Agro-Defense Facility in Manhattan, Kansas

== Budget ==
DHS Science and Technology Budget, FY11-13 ($ in thousands)
Line Item	FY11 Actual	FY12 Actual	FY13 Request
Management and Administration	140,918	135,000	138,008
Acquisition and Operations Support	47,080	54,154	47,984
Laboratory Facilities	140,000	176,500	127,432
Research, Development, and Innovation	459,690	265,783	478,048
University Programs	39,890	36,563	40,000
Total Budget	827,578	668,000	831,472

== See also ==
- Virtual USA
