= Joint Regional Information Exchange System =

The Joint Regional Information Exchange System (JRIES) began in December 2002 as an all-source intelligence / information sharing system, designed initially as a grassroots pilot system to connect the California Anti-Terrorism Information Center, the New York Police Department, and the Defense Intelligence Agency (DIA).

== Purpose ==
These groups designed JRIES, which was first deployed in February 2003, to facilitate the exchange of suspicious activity reports, register events potentially related to terrorist activity, and foster real-time intelligence and law enforcement collaboration in a secure environment across federal, state, and local jurisdictions. JRIES used a commercial, off-the-shelf software collaboration tool application to enable multiple groups to share the information securely. A JRIES executive board, composed of representatives from the participating groups, provided guidance and structure to help manage the system. JRIES proved useful during the northeast blackout in 2003 when information posted on the system allowed users across the country to quickly learn that the event was not related to terrorism. The system provided a very simple and efficient way for the law enforcement community to obtain situational awareness concurrently, without the need for hundreds of phone calls.

== Transfer to DHS ==
Although DIA originally operated and maintained JRIES, DIA transferred program management of the system to the U.S. Department of Homeland Security (DHS) in September 2003, due to funding constraints. DIA was concerned that managing JRIES to support domestic intelligence activities conflicted with its military intelligence role. As of February 2004, approximately 100 organizations–with more than 1,000 law enforcement and intelligence analysts from federal, state, and local government agencies—were using JRIES.

== Expansion ==
After acquiring JRIES, DHS recognized that the system's utility could be expanded beyond its existing counter-terrorism intelligence and threat awareness mission because JRIES met DHS' requirements for senior executive communications, crisis planning and management, and coordination and communications with first responder, emergency management, and military organizations. As such, in February 2004, DHS announced the expansion of JRIES as its primary communication, collaboration, situational awareness, and information-sharing system. The DHS Secretary renamed JRIES as the Homeland Security Information Network (HSIN) in order to reflect the system's broader scope. By December 2004, DHS had deployed HSIN to all 50 states, 53 major urban areas, five U.S. territories, the District of Columbia, and several international partners. DHS extended HSIN access beyond the law enforcement community to include state homeland security advisors, governors' offices, emergency managers, first responders, the National Guard, and an international component. DHS equipped each location with two laptops installed with the commercial, off-the-shelf software collaboration tool application.

=== Web-based portals ===
In February 2004, because of the lack of scalability to accommodate a large increase in users, DHS decided to move HSIN away from the current software collaboration tool and to develop a series of web-based portals as replacements. Nonetheless, DHS continues to operate both the commercial software collaboration tool application and a portal to support the law enforcement community.

=== State and local initiatives ===
DHS has expanded the role of HSIN through a state and local initiative. The goals of this initiative are to identify and address requirements of state and local communities of interest, as well as to provide robust training to promote effective use of the network. As of January 2006, eight states had deployed HSIN throughout their respective departments and agencies. Declaring HSIN the primary system for operational information sharing and collaboration, the DHS Secretary asked that the department's senior managers as well as headquarters and field personnel support the ongoing growth and utilization of HSIN.

== See also ==
- Multistate Anti-Terrorism Information Exchange
- Regional Information Sharing Systems

== Sources ==
- Department of Homeland Security, Office of Inspector General: Homeland Security Information Network Could Support Information Sharing More Effectively. OIG-06-38, June 2006
- JRIES Homeland Security Network Falls Victim to Policy Dispute by Alice Lipowicz, GCN.com
- DHS: Homeland Security Information Network to Expand Collaboration, Connectivity for States and Major Cities. Press Release, Date 02/24/04
