= Multistate Anti-Terrorism Information Exchange =

Data analyzing system federally funded by the United States

The Multistate Anti-Terrorism Information Exchange Program, also known by the acronym MATRIX, was a U.S. federally funded data mining system originally developed for the Florida Department of Law Enforcement described as a tool to identify terrorist subjects.

The system was reported to analyze government and commercial databases to find associations between suspects or to discover locations of or completely new "suspects". The database and technologies used in the system were housed by Seisint, a Florida-based company since acquired by LexisNexis.

The Matrix program was shut down in June 2005 after federal funding was cut in the wake of public concerns over privacy and state surveillance.

== History ==
Matrix was the brainchild of Hank Asher, a businessman in the data aggregation field. Asher reportedly contacted Florida police immediately after the September 11 terrorist attacks, claiming he could find the hijackers as well as other potential terrorists. Asher reportedly offered to make available the database and technology that could do the job quickly, for free, supplied by the company he owned and operated: Seisint.

Control of the system was handed over to law enforcement officials, although Seisint continued to house and operate it on their behalf. After a demonstration of the system at the White House in January 2003 Matrix received US$4 million in grants from the U.S. Justice Department and the program was earmarked US$8 million by the U.S. Department of Homeland Security.

The program snowballed, as states signed up to participate, including Alabama, Connecticut, Florida, Georgia, Kentucky, Louisiana, Michigan, New York, Oregon, Pennsylvania, South Carolina, Ohio and Utah. California and Texas joined then exited the program, citing privacy and security concerns. The U.S. federal government and the CIA was cited as likely future users.

The program's similarity to the Total Information Awareness (TIA) federally funded initiative that was terminated following public concerns contributed to Matrix's demise. Matrix came under scrutiny by the American Civil Liberties Union (ACLU) which made Freedom of Information Act requests in Florida, where the program originated, and to the federal government on 30 October 2003. The ACLU followed this up with simultaneous information requests in Connecticut, Michigan, New York, Ohio and Pennsylvania for information about those states' participation in Matrix.

The ACLU's requests sought to find out the information sources that Matrix was drawing upon, who had access to the database and how it is being used. As well as the funding and operations described here, the ACLU's requests revealed that Matrix would perform an almost identical function to the banned TIA. Matrix would bind together government and commercial databases to allow federal and state law enforcement entities to conduct detailed searches on individuals.

Public revelation of the projects funding caused an uproar in the media and states began withdrawing their support. The Matrix program was finally shut down in June 2005 after federal funding was cut in the wake of public concerns over privacy and state surveillance.

Seisint retained the technology used to operate Matrix. Both Seisint and its Matrix technology are now owned by LexisNexis.

== Function ==
The Matrix website stated that the data would include criminal histories, driver's license data, vehicle registration records, and public data record entries. Other data was thought to include credit histories, driver's license photographs, marriage and divorce records, social security numbers, dates of birth, and the names and addresses of family members, neighbors and business associates. All of this information is available to the government without the need for a warrant. The ACLU pointed out that the type of data that the Matrix compiles could be expanded to include information in commercial databases encompasses such as purchasing habits, magazine subscriptions, income and job histories.

Matrix would combine these government records and information from commercial databases in a data warehouse. Dossiers would be reviewed by specialized software to identify anomalies using 'mathematical analysis'. When anomalies are spotted, they would be scrutinized by personnel who would search for evidence of terrorism or other crimes.

Like the TIA, Matrix would use data mining where searches for patterns in this data (including the 'anomalies') would be used to identify individuals possibly involved in terrorist or other criminal activity. Congressional critic Paula B. Dockery pointed out that like the TIA, this kind of 'data mining' may be ineffective, and have severe downsides, including its privacy costs.

Data from Matrix would be transferred through the Regional Information Sharing Systems network, an existing secure law enforcement network used to transmit sensitive information among law enforcement agencies. The network was linked to High Intensity Drug Trafficking Areas, United States Attorneys' Offices, other federal agencies and several state law enforcement systems.

== See also ==
- Computer Assisted Passenger PreScreening System II
- Joint Regional Information Exchange System
- Regional Information Sharing Systems
- Surveillance
- Terrorist Screening Center
- Total Information Awareness
- Traffic violations reciprocity and Driver License Agreement
- USA PATRIOT Act
