= Amphitrite IV (yacht) =

Greek royal yacht (1864–1941)

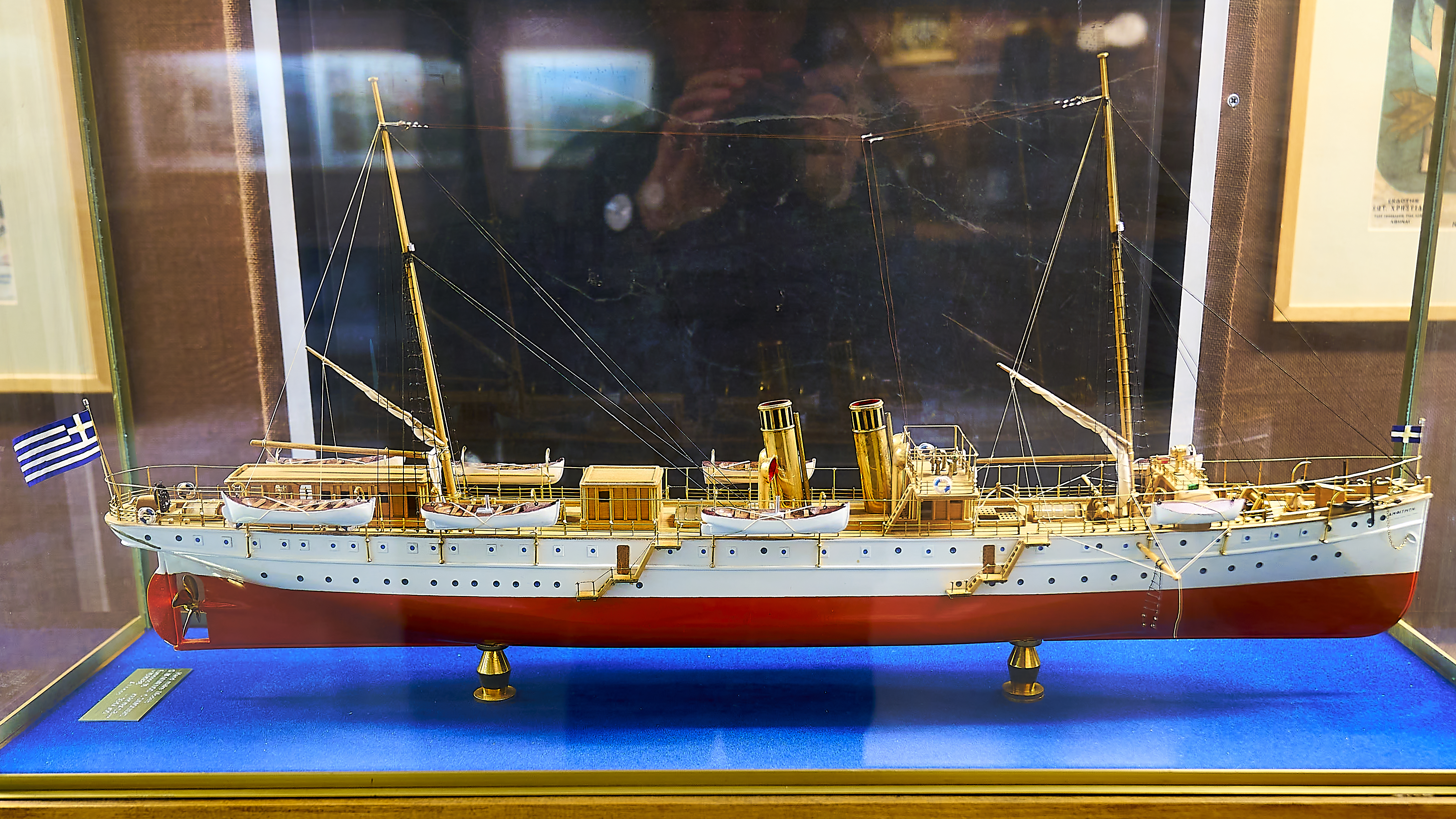
- Model of Amphitrite in the Athens War Museum

History

Greece
- Name: (United Kingdom) Malvina (1864-1873); (Greece) Bouboulina (1873-1895); (Greece) Amphitrite (1895-1941)
- Namesake: Amphitrite
- Owner: Hellenic Navy
- Completed: 1864
- Acquired: 1864
- In service: 1864
- Out of service: 23 April 1941
- Fate: Sunk in an air raid on 23 April 1941

General characteristics
- Type: Royal yacht
- Tonnage: 1,950 GRT
- Length: 91 m (298 ft 7 in)
- Beam: 10 m (32 ft 10 in)
- Depth: 6 m (19 ft 8 in)
- Speed: 11 knots (20 km/h; 13 mph)
- Notes: 2 masts and 2 funnels

Amphitrite IV was a Greek royal yacht that took the body of King George I of Greece back to Athens following his assassination in 1913 before she was sunk in a German air raid on 23 April 1941 during the German invasion of Greece in World War II.

== Construction ==
Amphitrite IV was built as the cargo ship Malvina in Birkenhead, United Kingdom in 1864, and completed that same year. The ship was 91 metres (298 ft 7 in) long, had a beam of 10 metres (32 ft 10 in) and a depth of 6 metres (19 ft 8 in). She was assessed at 1,950 gross register tons (GRT) and had a steam engine producing 1,400 hp. The ship could reach a maximum speed of 11 knots (20 km/h; 13 mph) and possessed two masts and two funnels.

== Early career ==
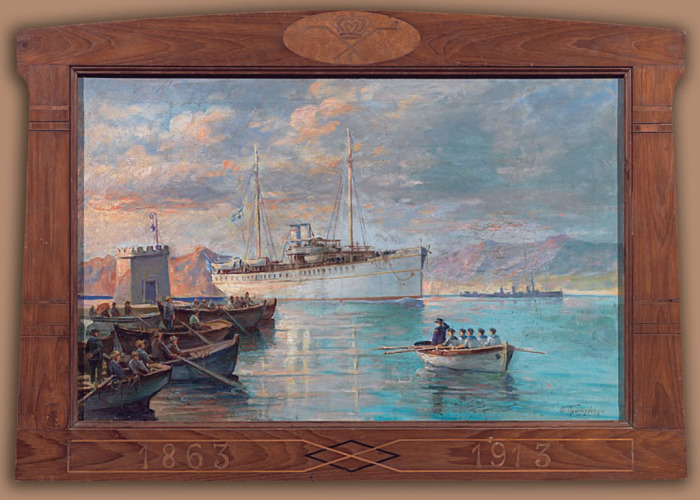
Amphitrite arriving in Athens with the remains of King George I of Greece on 27 March 1913

Malvina was purchased by the Greek government in 1873 in order to transport several guns and new boilers to be used on the Ironclad warship Vasilefs Georgios from the United Kingdom to Greece. The reason behind the ship's purchase by the Greek government, was due to the costs of buying Malvina being lower than the cost of transporting her freight with another cargo ship. After her arrival in Greece, Malvina was converted into a troopship and renamed Bouboulina. In 1895, King George I of Greece ordered Bouboulina to be converted into his royal yacht and renamed her Amphitrite. King George I made use of his yacht until he was assassinated by Alexandros Schinas in the recently liberated Thessaloniki on 18 March 1913. Following a ceremony in Thessaloniki on 25 March 1913, the king's coffin was carried on board Amphitrite by his sons including the new king where the Metropolitan delivered a speech honoring the late king before the yacht set sail for Piraeus. Amphitrite was accompanied by three Greek destroyers, the Russian gunboat Uralets, the German battlecruiser Goeben, the British cruiser Yarmouth, the French cruiser Bruix, and the Italian cruiser San Giorgio. Initially delayed by fog, the yacht arrived in Athens just before noon on 27 March where a number of high dignitaries of the court and the kingdom awaited at the dock to pay their respects to the king's remains. The king's coffin was disembarked while the batteries fired salvos and was then placed on a cannon carriage that was pulled by Greek sailors. The arrival of Amphitrite with the king's remains was depicted in two paintings, including one by the famous Greek marine artist Vasileios Hatzis.

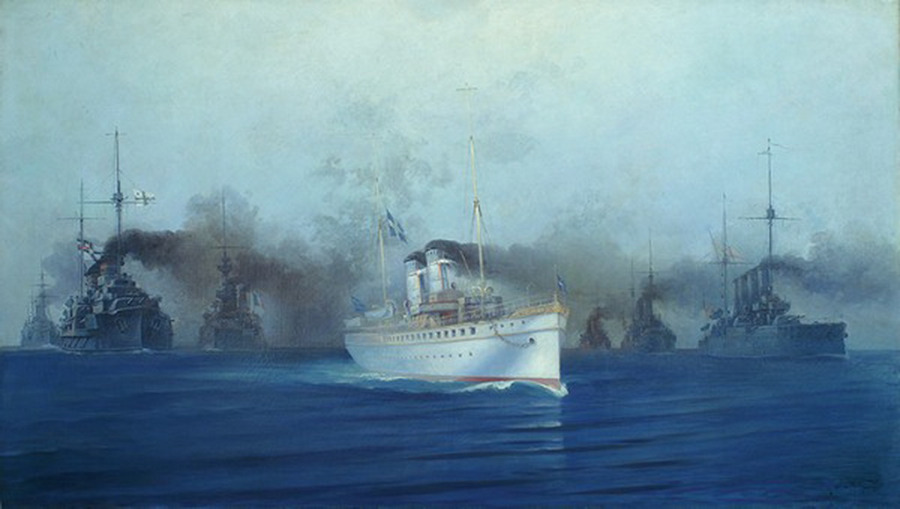
Amphitrite alongside her escort ships en route from Thessaloniki to Athens carrying the remains of King George I of Greece as painted by Vasileios Hatzis

== Later years and sinking ==
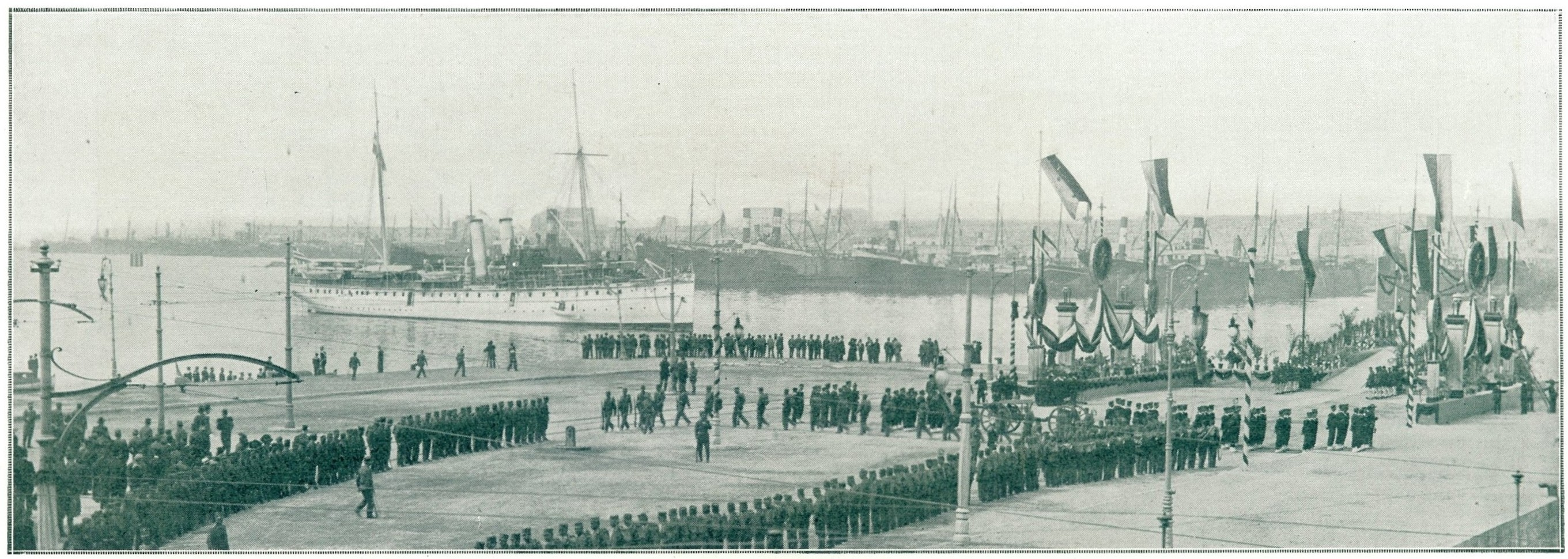
Amphitrite arriving at Piraeus with the body of King George I

Amphitrite continued to be used by the royal family until 1917, after which the ship saw many uses which included her conversion into a hospital ship in 1918 and her career as a training ship for Non-commissioned officers and Naval Cadets. She was also used as an Auxiliary ship and transferred to the Supreme Submarine Command of the Hellenic Navy in 1934. Amphitrite was in the process of being converted into a floating coal bunker at the Salamis Naval Base in April 1941 when the German army invaded Greece and an air raid was carried out on the naval base on 23 April, sinking four ships including Amphitrite.
