= Alexandros Schinas =

Assassin of King George I of Greece

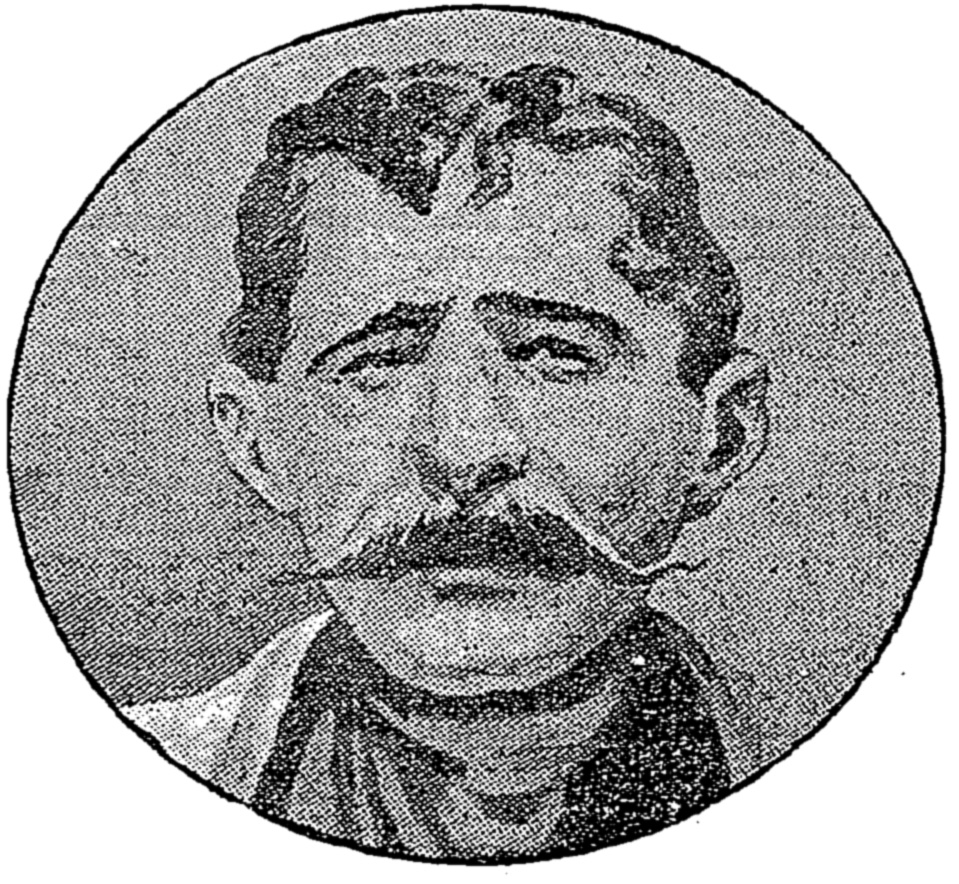
Portrait of Alexandros Schinas published in The New York Times on 13 April 1913

Alexandros Schinas (Greek: Αλέξανδρος Σχινάς, c. 1870 – 6 May 1913), also known as Aleko Schinas, assassinated King George I of Greece in 1913. Schinas has been variously portrayed as either an anarchist with political motivations (propaganda by deed), or a madman, but the historical record is inconclusive. Schinas described himself as a socialist.

The details of the assassination itself are known: On 18 March 1913, several months after capturing Thessaloniki from the Ottoman Empire during the First Balkan War, King George I was out for a late afternoon walk in the city and, as was his custom, lightly guarded. Encountering George on the street near the White Tower, Schinas shot the king once in the back from close range with a revolver, killing him. Schinas was arrested and tortured. He said he acted alone, blaming his actions on delirium brought on by tuberculosis. After several weeks in custody, Schinas died by falling out of a police station window either as murder or suicide.

The details of Schinas's life before the assassination are unclear. His occupation and native Greek birthplace are unconfirmed. According to Schinas, he finished medical school but practiced medicine without authorization because he could not afford to pay for a medical degree. Several years before the assassination, Schinas may have left Greece for New York City, working in two hotels before returning in February 1913. Some contemporary sources reported that he advocated anarchism or socialism, and ran an anarchist school that was shut down by the Greek government. Other sources suggested he was mentally ill or exacting revenge against the king for denying a request for financial assistance. Other theories have claimed that Schinas acted as a foreign agent, but no direct evidence supporting these theories has emerged.

== Early life ==
Greece (present day)

Very little is confirmed about Schinas's life before he assassinated King George I. Schinas was born around 1870, reportedly in the area of Volos or Serres, both of which were under Ottoman control at the time. He had two sisters, one older and one younger, and may have had a brother named Hercules who ran a chemist shop in Volos where Schinas may have worked as an assistant. Schinas told an interviewer that he suffered from an unspecified "neurological condition" beginning at age 14, which he said began "torturing" him at age 25. He studied medicine, possibly at the National and Kapodistrian University of Athens, where he may have also been an instructor. Lacking the funds needed to obtain a degree, Schinas left Athens and took a teaching job in the Aromanian village Kleisoura. After a financial dispute with his sisters, he resigned and moved to Xanthi, where he practiced medicine without a degree until stopped by authorities.

Schinas's life after Xanthi is the subject of some dispute. In a New York Times interview after the assassination, the Greek consul general for New York said that Schinas opened a school in Volos called the Centre for Workingmen with a doctor and a lawyer. The school was closed down by the government within months for "teaching anti-government ideas". The doctor and lawyer were sentenced to three months in prison but, for reasons unknown, Schinas was not punished. According to the consul general, during this period, Schinas also stood unsuccessfully as a candidate for the office of deputy from Volos in the national legislature.

The New York-based Greek newspaper Atlantis disputed the consul general's account, publishing a letter from an acquaintance of Schinas stating that the Schinas who ran for office in Volos was someone else. The letter, which was endorsed by the newspaper's editors as accurate, contested Schinas's involvement in the Centre for Workingmen school, writing: "Schinas had nothing to do with any school and had no idea of entering politics. He was known as a man who loved isolation and his backgammon. He wore a beard and was an anarchist." The newspaper's founder suggested that the conflicting stories about Schinas may be due to the surname's commonality in Greece and the likely existence of multiple people named "Aleko Schinas".

== Leaving Thessaloniki ==
According to Schinas, in 1910 he was deported from Thessaloniki by the Young Turks for being "a good Greek patriot". The Greek consul general in New York suggested another explanation for Schinas's departure: that he was evading the police following the closure of the Center for Workingmen school in Volos. The Atlantis letter, on the other hand, wrote that Schinas left because of a family quarrel with his brother Hercules.

Contemporary newspaper articles and Greek government officials reported that in the years prior to the assassination, Schinas lived in New York City, working at the Fifth Avenue and Plaza Hotels. He studied socialism, frequented "radical circles" in New York's Lower East Side, and distributed copies of English socialist Robert Blatchford's Merrie England to his co-workers at the Plaza Hotel. The reports described Schinas as espousing "strange" and "incomprehensible" socialist views, and a general disdain for the monarchy.

No known immigration or other records document Schinas's deportation from Thessaloniki or arrival in New York in 1910. Immigration records document the arrival in 1905 of a man named "Athanasios Schinas", approximately the same age as Alexandros Schinas would have been at the time, but it is unclear whether they are the same person. In apparent contrast to reports of his emigration in 1910, a 1913 article in The New York Times reported that Schinas was still in Greece in 1911, stating that he applied that year for assistance at the king's palace but was refused and driven off by palace guards.

Although it is uncertain when, why, or even whether he moved to New York City, Schinas was back in Greece by February 1913. According to post-assassination press and government reports, about three weeks before the assassination, he traveled from Athens to Volos, then to Thessaloniki, possibly begging and "subsisting almost entirely on milk". A Greek diplomat said that Schinas "lived in a miserable inn giving two kuruş a day for his sleep and spending another two kuruş for his food." The Greek Minister of Justice stated that Schinas stayed at the house of a local lawyer until he was kicked out over a dispute involving blackmail. While in custody, Schinas told an interviewer that some weeks prior the assassination, he had contracted tuberculosis, and that a few days before the assassination, he was suffering from "severe high fevers" and "deliriums", overtaken "by madness".

== First Balkan War ==
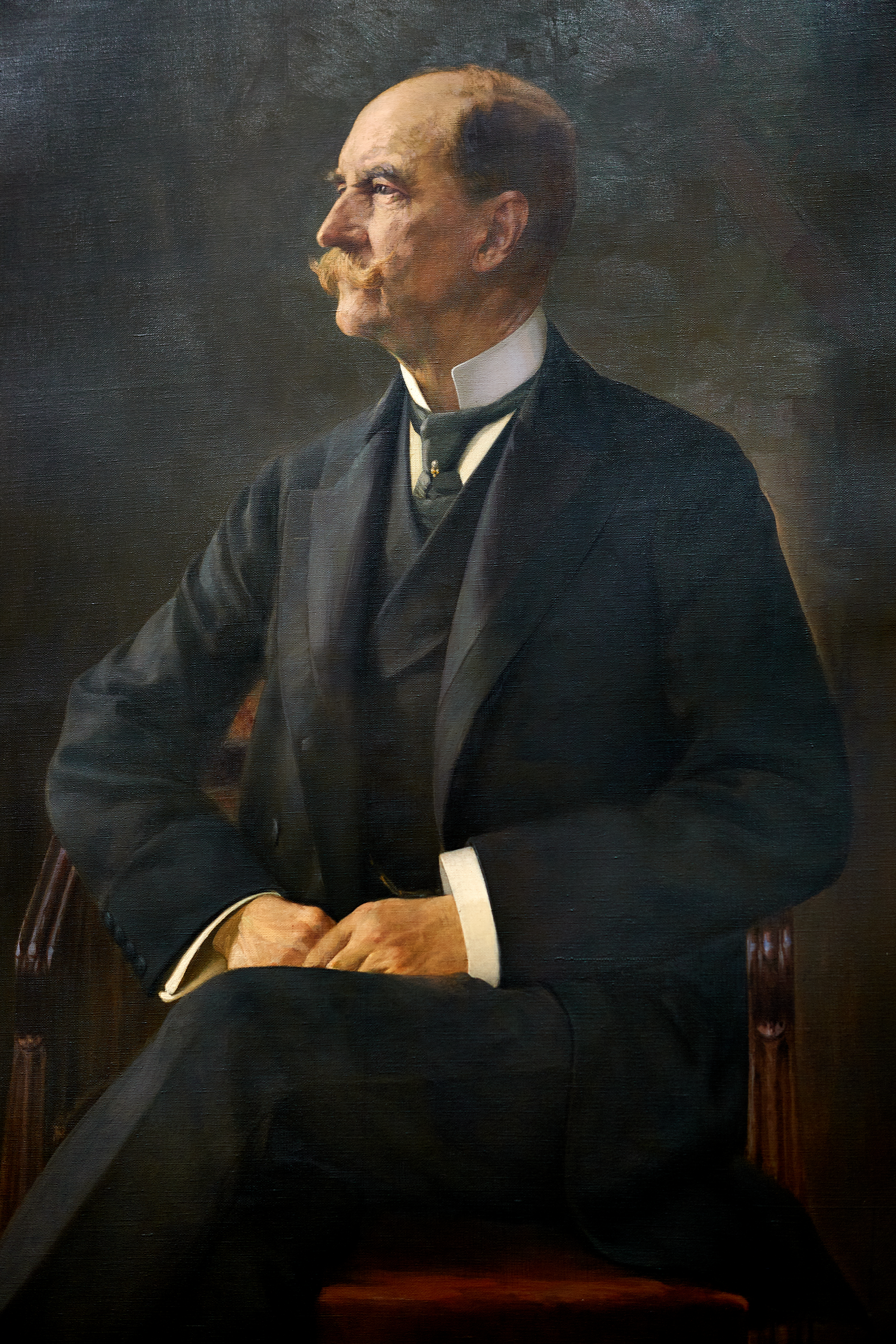
1914 posthumous portrait of King George I of Greece by painter Georgios Jakobides

By the time Schinas arrived in Thessaloniki in February 1913, King George I had been staying there for several months, planning a celebration of the city's liberation from the Ottomans in the First Balkan War. Greece had been ruled by the Ottoman Empire from the mid-fifteenth century until the 1820s, when it won independence with help from Britain, France, and Russia, who installed a Bavarian prince named Otto as the constitutional monarch of the new Kingdom of Greece. Thirty years later, the "much-reviled" Otto was overthrown, and Britain, France, and Russia, chose as his successor a 17-year-old Danish prince, who was approved by the Greek National Assembly and crowned "George I, King of the Hellenes".

In pursuit of the Megali Idea ("Great Idea"), the irredentist belief that Ottoman-controlled Greek lands would be reclaimed and the Byzantine Empire restored, Greece recovered Volos and other parts of Thessaly in the 1881 Convention of Constantinople, but suffered a humiliating defeat in the First Greco-Turkish War in 1897 under the military leadership of George's eldest son, Crown Prince Constantine. George survived an assassination attempt the following year and a military coup in 1909, which ended with the appointment of a new prime minister, Eleftherios Venizelos, who reorganized the Greek military and relegated Constantine to a ceremonial role. When Greece's Balkan League allies Bulgaria, Serbia and Montenegro declared war against the Ottoman Empire in October 1912, George saw it as an opportunity to restore Greece's reputation following its defeat fifteen years earlier.

Early gains in the First Balkan War led to divisions among the allies over the spoils, especially the geographically and economically important port of Thessaloniki, the second-largest city of the Ottoman Balkans after Constantinople itself. In early November, Greek forces arrived in the city, mere hours ahead of their Bulgarian allies. Constantine rode at the head of the Greek army through the city to the Konak, where he received the Ottomans' surrender. Greeks greeted the liberation of Thessaloniki with jubilation, and George and Venizelos rushed to the city to strengthen Greece's claims and plan a victory celebration coinciding with George's upcoming golden jubilee.

== Assassination of King George I ==
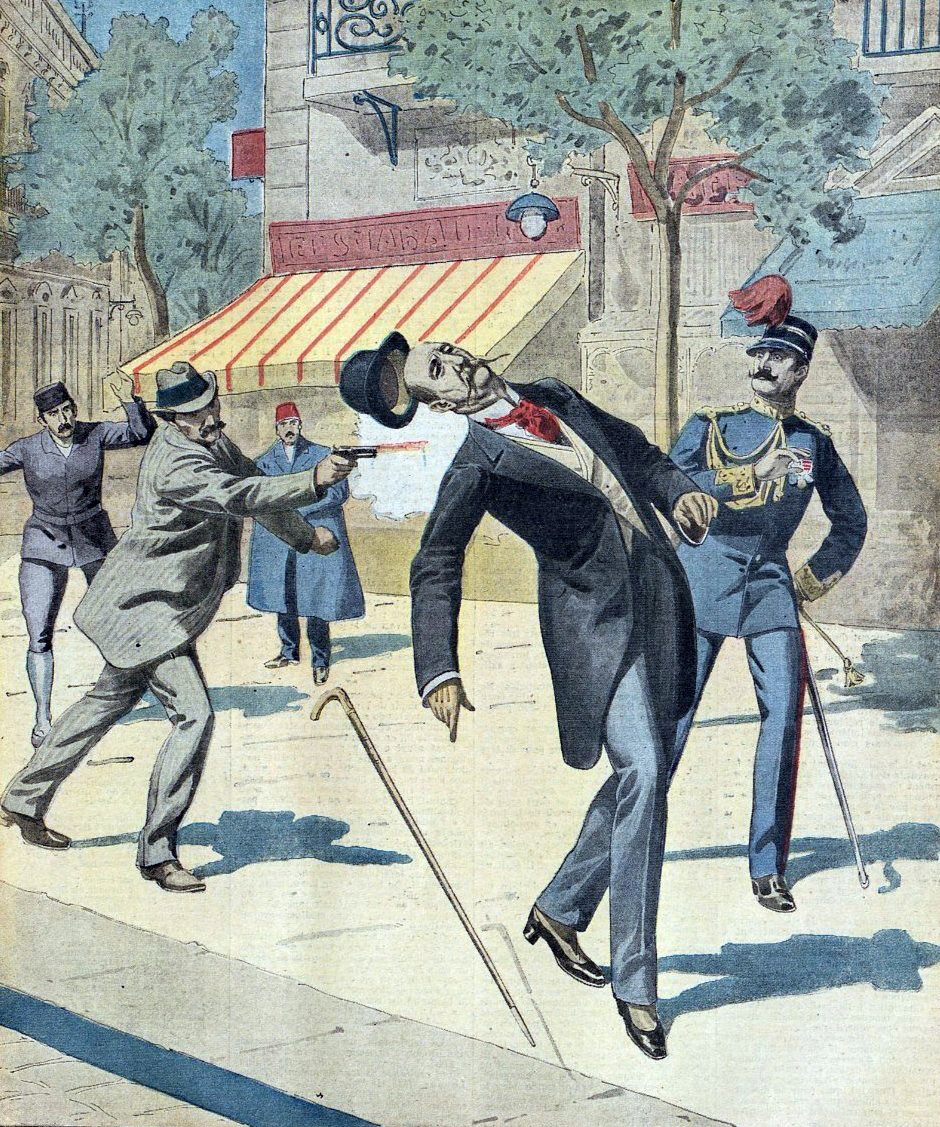
Illustration of the assassination published in Le Petit Journal on 30 March 1913

The liberation of Thessaloniki in November 1912 was followed by the recapture of Ioannina, another Ottoman-held Greek city, at the Battle of Bizani in early March. By the time of his assassination, George was a popular king, having brought the Megali Idea closer than ever during his nearly-50-year reign. On 18 March 1913, George took his usual afternoon walk in Thessaloniki, accompanied by his aide-de-camp, Ioannis Frangoudis. Against the urging of his advisers, the king refused to travel the city with a large number of guards; only two gendarmes were permitted to follow at a distance. George and Frangoudis walked by the harbor near the White Tower, discussing the king's upcoming visit to the German battlecruiser Goeben.

At approximately 5:15 p.m. on the corner of Vassilissis Olgas and Aghias Triadas streets, Schinas shot George in the back at point-blank range with a revolver. According to The New York Times, Schinas had "lurked in hiding" and "rushed out" to shoot the king. Another version described Schinas emerging from a Turkish cafe called the "Pasha Liman", drunk and "ragged", and shooting George when he walked by. The bullet pierced the king's heart. He collapsed and was taken by carriage to a nearby hospital but died before arriving. (Note: There are conflicting reports of the king's last words. The New York Times reported that they were: "Tomorrow, when I pay my formal visit to the dreadnought Goeben, it is the fact that a German battleship is to honor a Greek King here in Salonika that will fill me with happiness and contentment". However, the king's biographer, Walter Christmas, recorded the king's last words as, "Thank God, Christmas can now finish his work with a chapter to the glory of Greece, of the Crown Prince and of the Army.")

Schinas did not attempt to escape afterwards and Frangoudis immediately apprehended him. Additional gendarmerie quickly arrived from a nearby police station. Schinas reportedly asked the officers to protect him from the surrounding crowd. At the hospital, George's third son Prince Nicholas announced that his eldest brother Constantine was now king.

== Death ==
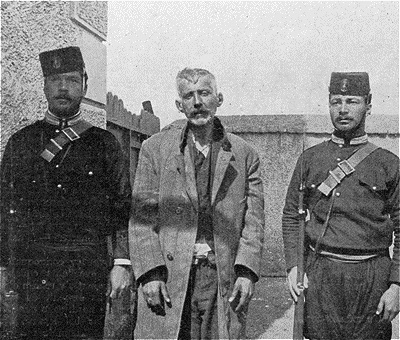
Photograph of Schinas in custody taken the day after the assassination and published in L'Illustration

Schinas was tortured or "forced to undergo examinations" while in gendarmerie custody. He did not name any accomplices. According to Greek newspaper Kathimerini, in a private meeting, Schinas told Queen Olga he had acted alone. Kathimerini also reported that Schinas gave depositions after his arrest but the transcripts were lost in a fire aboard a ship while being transported to Piraeus.

In a March 1913 jailhouse interview with a newspaper reporter, Schinas was asked if his assassination of the king was premeditated, to which he replied:

No! I assassinated the King by chance (it just happened). I was walking as a dead man (as a zombie) without knowing where I was going. Suddenly by turning my head I saw behind me the King with his adjutant. I slowed my pace. The King walked by me, very close to me. I let him walk by me and immediately, I fired.

On 6 May 1913, six weeks after being arrested, Schinas died by falling thirty feet (nine meters) out of a window from the gendarmerie's Examining Magistrate office in Thessaloniki. He was approximately 43 years old. The gendarmerie reported that Schinas, who was not handcuffed at the time, ran and jumped out of the window when the guards were distracted. Some suggest Schinas may have committed suicide to avoid further gendarmerie "examinations" or a slow death from tuberculosis; others speculate that he was thrown from the window by the gendarmerie, perhaps to keep him quiet. After his death, his ear and hand were amputated and used for identification, then stored and exhibited at the Criminology Museum of Athens.

== Impact and motives ==
External videos
- Russian: Король Греции Георг I первый - покушение (1913), lit. 'King George I of Greece - assassination attempt (1913)' on YouTube, including film of George's funeral
- Funeral of King George I of Greece at Salonika (1913) on YouTube

The assassination caused "uproar", panic, and anguish among Greeks in Thessaloniki and beyond. Greeks mourned the death of George but were nevertheless enthusiastic about Constantine's ascent to the throne. In the ensuing years, division between Constantine and Venizelos led to the National Schism, a civil conflict some historians suggest might have been avoided if the popular King George I had not been assassinated by Schinas.

Although remembered as one of the early 20th century's "famous anarchist assassins" such as Luigi Lucheni and Leon Czolgosz, the historical record of Schinas's motivations is inconclusive. Prominent conspiracy theories suggested the assassin was an agent of the Ottomans, the Bulgarians, the Dual Alliance of Germany and Austria-Hungary, (Note: George's heir, Constantine, described as "very much a Prussian", was married to German princess Sophia of Prussia and suspected of being loyal to Germany over Greece.) or Macedonian nationalists. No evidence has emerged supporting these theories and no nationalist group claimed credit for the assassination, with scholars noting that the assassination destabilized the "delicate and hard-won peace" between the Greeks and Bulgarians, and that George had already decided to abdicate in favor of Constantine at his upcoming golden jubilee, rendering any intervention by the Dual Alliance unnecessary.

In the immediate aftermath of the assassination, Greece did not want to attribute a political motive to Schinas's actions. Greek guards had killed a few Muslim and Jewish residents of Thessaloniki they thought were responsible. To quell the public, the Greek government announced that the killer was Greek, describing Schinas as a "feeble intellect", "criminal degenerate", and "victim of alcoholism". This "state-issued narrative" of Schinas as a homeless alcoholic with anarchist beliefs has become the "accepted understanding". Accordingly, his motivation for the assassination is commonly ascribed to his anarchist politics (as propaganda of the deed) or to mental illness (without political motivation).

In the jailhouse interview, Schinas was asked "Are you an anarchist?" to which he replied:

No, no! I am not an anarchist, but socialist. I became a socialist, when I was studying medicine in Athens. I do not know how. One becomes a socialist, without realising it, slowly (one step at a time). All people that are good and educated are socialist. The philosophy towards medicine, for me it was the socialism.

Other theories of the motive have emerged, such as that the assassination was revenge for the king's refusal of Schinas's 1911 request for government assistance, or that Schinas had lost an inherited fortune in the Greek stock market, was in poor health, or despondent prior to the attack. A 1914 New York Times article describing recent political assassinations did not list Schinas among "anarchists who believe in militant tactics", instead describing George I's "murderer" as "a Greek named Aleko Schinas who probably was half demented". Writing in 2014, Michael Newton described the gendarmerie's torture of Schinas as producing "a confused confession that mixed anarchist sentiments with a claim that 'he had killed the King because he refused to give him money.'"

Writing in 2018, Michael Kemp expressed doubts about Schinas's affiliation with anarchism and propaganda by deed. He noted that both "socialism" and "anarchism" were used interchangeably at the time, and that reports of Schinas as having run for political office or invested in a stock market do not support theories that Schinas was either a socialist or an anarchist. Kemp wrote, "Rather than being part of a wider conspiracy, whether political or enacted by a state, Alexandros Schinas may have simply been a sick man (both mentally and physically) seeking an escape from the harsh realities of the early twentieth century."

As for Schinas himself, he blamed his own actions on "deliriums" brought about by tuberculosis, saying in the 1913 interview:

During the night I was waking up, like I was being taken over by madness. I wanted to destroy the world. I wanted to kill everybody, because the whole of society was my enemy. Luck wanted that during this psychological condition to meet the King. I would have killed my own sister if I had met her that day.

== Sources ==
- Anastasiadēs, Giōrgos O. (Αναστασιάδης, Γιώργος Ο.) (2010). "Part B Chapter 2 Η δολοφονία του βασιλιά Γεώργιου Α' (1913)" [Part B Chapter 2 The assassination of King George I (1913)]. To palimpsēsto tou haimatos : politikes dolophonies kai ekteleseis stē Thessalonikē (1913-1968) [The palimpsest of blood: political assassinations and executions in Thessaloniki (1913-1968)] (in Greek) (1. ekd ed.). Epikentro. ISBN 9789604582808. OCLC 713835670.
- Ashdown, Dulcie M. (2011) [Orig. 1998]. Royal Murders: Hatred, Revenge and the Seizing of Power. The History Press. ISBN 9780752469195. OCLC 779141017.
- Christmas, Walter (1914). "Chapter XVI King George's Death". King George of Greece. Translated by Chater, Arthur G. McBride, Nast & Co. pp. 392–416. OCLC 681099563.
- Clogg, Richard (2002) [Orig. 1992]. A Concise History of Greece (2d ed.). Cambridge University Press. ISBN 0521004799. OCLC 223305401.
- Gallant, Thomas W. (2001). Modern Greece. Arnold. ISBN 9780340763360. OCLC 248722096.
- Halo, Thea (2017). "Chapter Eleven. The Genocide of the Ottoman Greeks 1913–23: Myths and Facts". In Shirinian, George N. (ed.). Genocide in the Ottoman Empire: Armenians, Assyrians, and Greeks, 1913-1923. Berghahn Books. pp. 300–322. ISBN 9781785334337. OCLC 1100925364.
- Jensen, Richard Bach (2013). "The first global wave of terrorism and international counter-terrorism". In Hanhimäki, Jussi M.; Blumenau, Bernhard (eds.). An International History of Terrorism: Western and Non-Western Experiences. Routledge. pp. 16–33. ISBN 9780415635400. OCLC 940598453.
- ——— (2015). "Anarchist terrorism and counter-terrorism in Europe and the world, 1878–1934". In Law, Randall D. (ed.). The Routledge History of Terrorism. Routledge. pp. 111–129. ISBN 9781317514879. OCLC 951551065.
- ——— (2016). "Historical lessons: an overview of early anarchism and lone actor terrorism". In Fredholm, Michael (ed.). Understanding Lone Actor Terrorism: Past Experience, Future Outlook, and Response Strategies. Routledge. pp. 29–45. ISBN 9781317328612. OCLC 947086466.
- Kaloudis, George (2019). Navigating Turbulent Waters: Greek Politics in the Era of Eleftherios Venizelos. Rowman & Littlefield. ISBN 9781498587396. OCLC 1108993066.
- Kathimerini staff (18 December 2006). "Four famous targets of assassination in Salonica". Kathimerini.
- Kemp, Michael (2018). "Beneath a White Tower". Bombs, Bullets and Bread: The Politics of Anarchist Terrorism Worldwide, 1866–1926. McFarland & Company. pp. 178–186. ISBN 9781476671017. OCLC 1043054028.
- Magrini (March 1913). "The King's Assassin Explains Himself to the Journalist Magrini". Aionos. Translated by Fragkos, Grigorios – via Kemp 2018, pp. 184–186.
- Mattox, Henry E. (2015) [Orig. 2004]. Chronology of World Terrorism, 1901–2001. McFarland & Company. ISBN 9781476609652. OCLC 910878829.
- New International Encyclopedia staff (1914) [Orig. 1902]. "Anarchism, Propaganda of the Deed". New International Encyclopedia (2nd ed.). Dodd, Mead & Co. pp. 589–590. OCLC 675893808.
- The New York Times staff (19 March 1913). "KING OF GREECE MURDERED AT SALONIKA; SLAYER MAD; POLITICAL RESULTS FEARED; Shot While Walking in Captured City -- Dies in Half an Hour". The New York Times. Marconi Transatlantic Wireless Telegraph. p. 1. (PDF)
- ——— (20 March 1913). "THE ASSASSIN LIVED HERE.; Worked in a New York Hotel -- Well Educated and an Anarchist". The New York Times. p. 3. (PDF)
- ——— (20 March 1913). "(untitled Salonika dateline)". The New York Times. p. 3. (PDF)
- ——— (21 March 1913). "(untitled Salonika dateline)". The New York Times. p. 4. (PDF)
- ——— (29 June 1914). "MANY RULERS FELL AT FANATICS' HANDS; Like Ferdinand and Duchess, They Were Victims of the Misguided National Spirit". The New York Times. p. 2. (PDF)
- Newton, Michael (2014). "George I of Greece (1845-1913)". Famous Assassinations in World History: An Encyclopedia [2 volumes]. ABC-Clio. pp. 179–181. ISBN 9781610692861. OCLC 957637380.
- Tomai, Fotini (21 October 2012). "Ο Γεώργιος Α' και ο δολοφόνος του" [George I and his murderer]. To Vima (in Greek).
- West, Nigel (2017). "George I". Encyclopedia of political assassinations. Rowman & Littlefield. p. 83. ISBN 9781538102381. OCLC 980219049.
