= Assassination of George I of Greece =

1913 murder in Thessaloniki, Greece

Assassination of George I
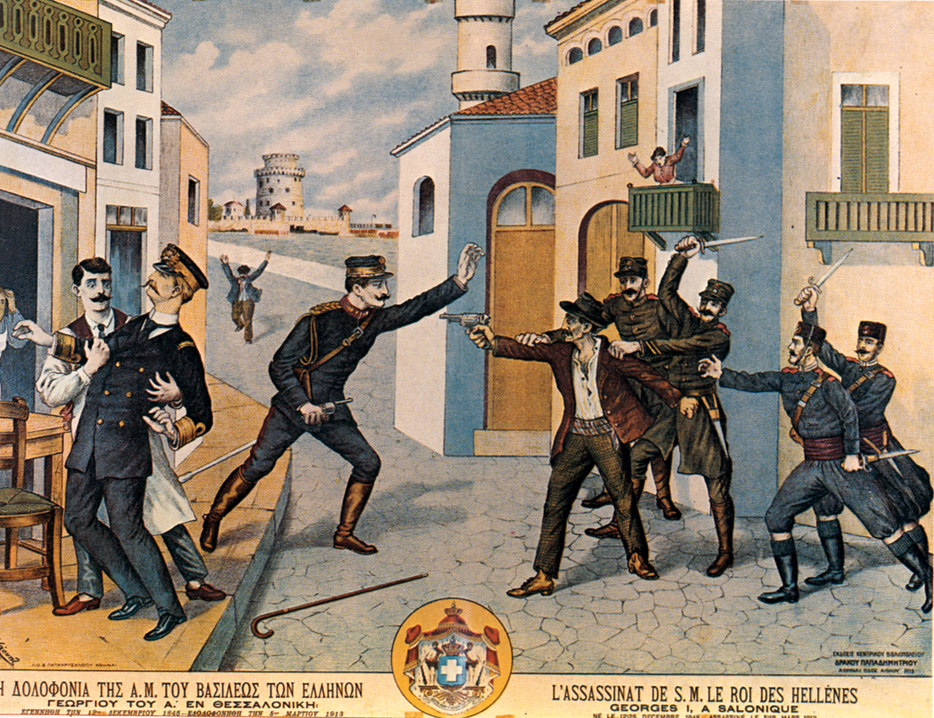
- Karl Haupt, The Assassination of H.M. the King of the Hellenes, 1913
- Location: Thessaloniki (Note: At the time of the King's assassination, Thessaloniki was an occupied Ottoman territory. The city was recognized as part of the Kingdom of Greece by the Treaty of Bucharest five months later.)
- Date: March 18, 1913; 17:15 (UTC+02:00)
- Target: George I of Greece
- Attack type: Assassination, regicide
- Weapon: Revolver
- Perpetrator: Alexandros Schinas
- Motive: Disputed: Anarchism (alleged); Delirium (self-claimed)

George I, the king of Greece, was assassinated on the late afternoon of March 18, 1913, in Thessaloniki, by Alexandros Schinas, an alleged Greek anarchist.

On the day of the murder, King George I was in Thessaloniki, recently conquered from the Ottomans by his son, Crown Prince Constantine. After 50 years of reign, the king, feeling frail, planned to abdicate during his upcoming golden jubilee in October. In the afternoon, he took his daily walk in the city streets, with minimal protection, as he did in Athens throughout his reign. At around 5:15 p.m. near the White Tower, Schinas shot him with a revolver. King George I was rushed to the hospital but died before arrival. To avoid inciting Greek resentment towards Thessaloniki, a city largely populated by Slavs, authorities denied any political motive for the regicide, attributing it to Schinas, described as an alcoholic and mentally unstable individual. Schinas was arrested by the Hellenic Gendarmerie, placed in custody, and interrogated, but he died from defenestration on May 6, 1913.

After being repatriated on the royal yacht Amphitrite to the Greek capital, the King's body, surrounded by Greek and Danish flags, was placed in the cathedral of Athens and publicly displayed for three days before being buried in the gardens of the royal palace of Tatoi. Constantine I succeeded his father on the eve of World War I, marking the beginning of a period of great instability for Greece and the Crown. Overthrown and replaced by his second son, Alexander, after only four years of reign, Constantine went into exile and only regained his throne in 1920. He was forced to abdicate permanently in 1922, this time in favor of his eldest son, George II, following Greece's defeat in the Greco-Turkish War.

== Background ==
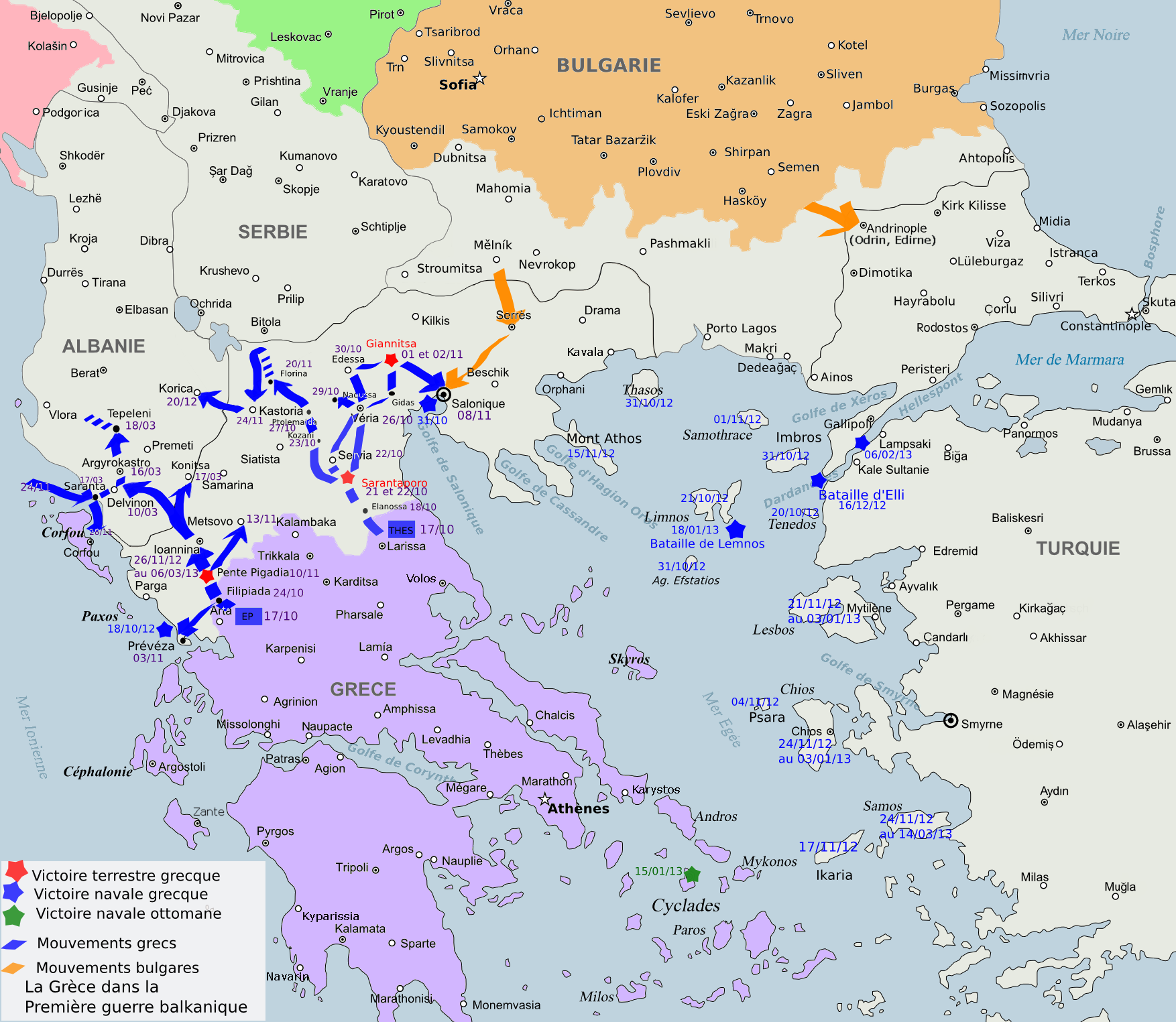
Greek operations during the First Balkan War.

After being under Ottoman rule from the mid-15th century until the 1820s, Greece gained independence in 1821 with support from the United Kingdom, France, and Russia. They appointed Prince Otto of Bavaria as the monarch of the new Kingdom of Greece. In 1862, King Otto I was overthrown, and the "protecting powers" selected Prince William of Denmark, who was 17 years old at the time, as his successor. He was approved by the Greek National Assembly and proclaimed "King of the Hellenes" under the regnal name George I on March 30, 1863.

The "Megali Idea," an irredentist belief in the recovery of Greek lands under Ottoman control and the restoration of the Byzantine Empire, led Greece to regain Volos and other parts of Thessaly during the Convention of Constantinople (1881). However, the country suffered a humiliating defeat in the First Greco-Turkish War in 1897, led by Crown Prince Constantine, the King's eldest son. King George I survived an assassination attempt the following year and a military coup in 1909, which resulted in Eleftherios Venizelos becoming Prime Minister. Venizelos reorganized the Greek armed forces and sidelined Constantine to an honorary position. In October 1912, when Bulgaria, Serbia, and Montenegro, Greece's allies in the Balkan League, declared war on the Ottoman Empire, the King saw an opportunity to restore Greece's reputation after its defeat fifteen years earlier.

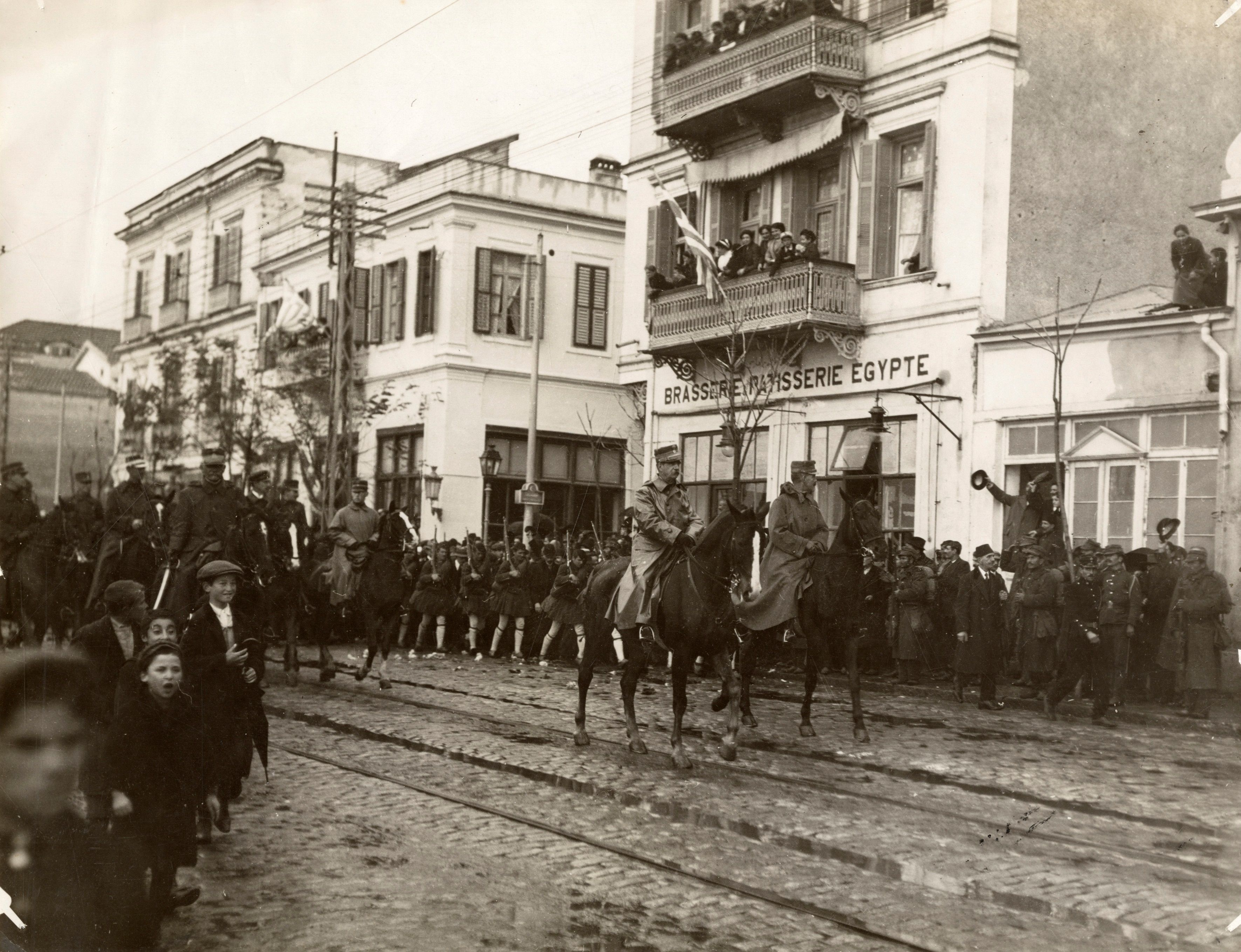
The Greek armed forces entering Thessaloniki (1912).

The early victories of the First Balkan War caused divisions among the allies over the spoils, particularly the port of Thessaloniki (the second largest city in the Ottoman Balkans after Constantinople), the capital from a geographical and economic perspective. In early November, Greek forces entered the city before their Bulgarian allies. Constantine led the army through the city and accepted the surrender of the Ottomans at the Government House. The Greeks celebrated the city's liberation with joy. George I and Venizelos rushed to Thessaloniki to support Greece's claims and organize a victory celebration for the king's upcoming golden jubilee. The liberation of Thessaloniki was followed by the capture of Ioannina, another Greek city held by the Ottomans, during the Battle of Bizani in early March 1913.

When he was assassinated on March 18, 1913, George I had been reigning for almost 50 years. He was a popular king who embraced the "Great Idea" more than ever during his reign and reached the peak of his prestige after the victory in Thessaloniki.

== Assassination ==
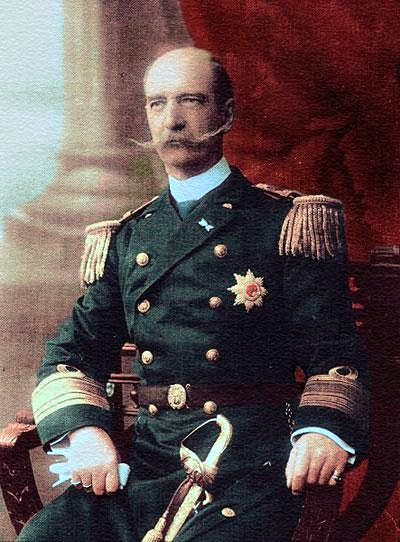
King George I of Greece (c. 1910).

Eager to leverage his popularity to solidify his dynasty, George I decided to abdicate in favor of his son, Crown Prince Constantine. During his stay in Thessaloniki, the King announced to his family his intention to step down on his upcoming golden jubilee in October. He cited his declining vigor as the reason for his decision and believed that Constantine, with his ideal age and stature, was ready to take over the throne.

On March 18, 1913, King George I took his usual afternoon walk in the streets of Thessaloniki with his aide-de-camp, Ioannis Frangoudis. He moved around almost unprotected, just as he had done in Athens since the beginning of his reign. Despite advice from his advisors, the King preferred minimal protection, only allowing two gendarmes to follow at a distance. They strolled near the White Tower and discussed the King's upcoming visit to the German battlecruiser Goeben. However, as they reached the corner of Vasilissis Olgas and Agia Triada streets, they were unexpectedly approached by Alexandros Schinas, a presumed Greek anarchist, around 43 years old.

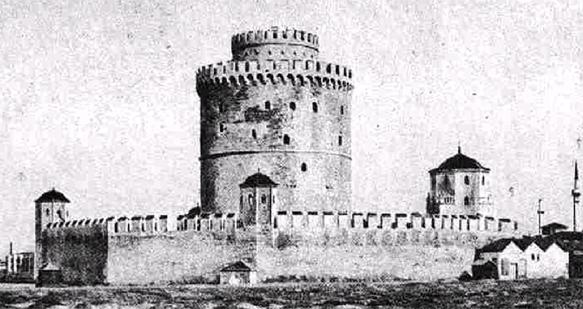
The White Tower (1912).

At around 5:15 pm, (Note: Jean des Cars states that the assassination occurred at 6:30 pm, while Prince Christopher of Greece places it in the morning. However, other sources offer conflicting accounts of the timing.) Schinas shot the king point-blank in the back with a revolver. According to The New York Times, Schinas had concealed himself and quickly approached to shoot the King. Another account depicts him emerging from a Turkish café named Pasha Liman, intoxicated and disheveled, and firing at George I as he walked by. The bullet struck the King's heart, leading to his collapse. The monarch was then transported by carriage to the nearest military hospital, but he succumbed to his injuries before arrival, at the age of 67.

The New York Times reported George I's last words: "Tomorrow, when I make my official visit to the battleship Goeben, it is the fact that a German battleship honors a Greek king here in Salonica that will fill me with happiness and satisfaction." However, the king's biographer, Captain Walter Christmas, reported his last words as follows: "Thank God, Christmas can now finish his work with a chapter to the glory of Greece, the Crown Prince, and the army." (Note: Reporting on the attack, the French newspaper Le Gaulois indicates that the two sentences were pronounced successively.)

Alexandros Schinas did not attempt to escape and was immediately apprehended by Ioannis Frangoudis. Additional gendarmes quickly arrived from a nearby police station. Schinas reportedly asked the officers to protect him from the surrounding crowd. Prince Nicolas, George I's third son, was quickly informed of the event and rushed to the hospital. As the only member of the royal family present in Thessaloniki, he was the one who informed the new monarch of his father's death. Crown Prince Constantine was in Epirus at the time, commanding the army that had just taken Ioannina, with his brother, Prince Christopher.

== National and international reactions ==
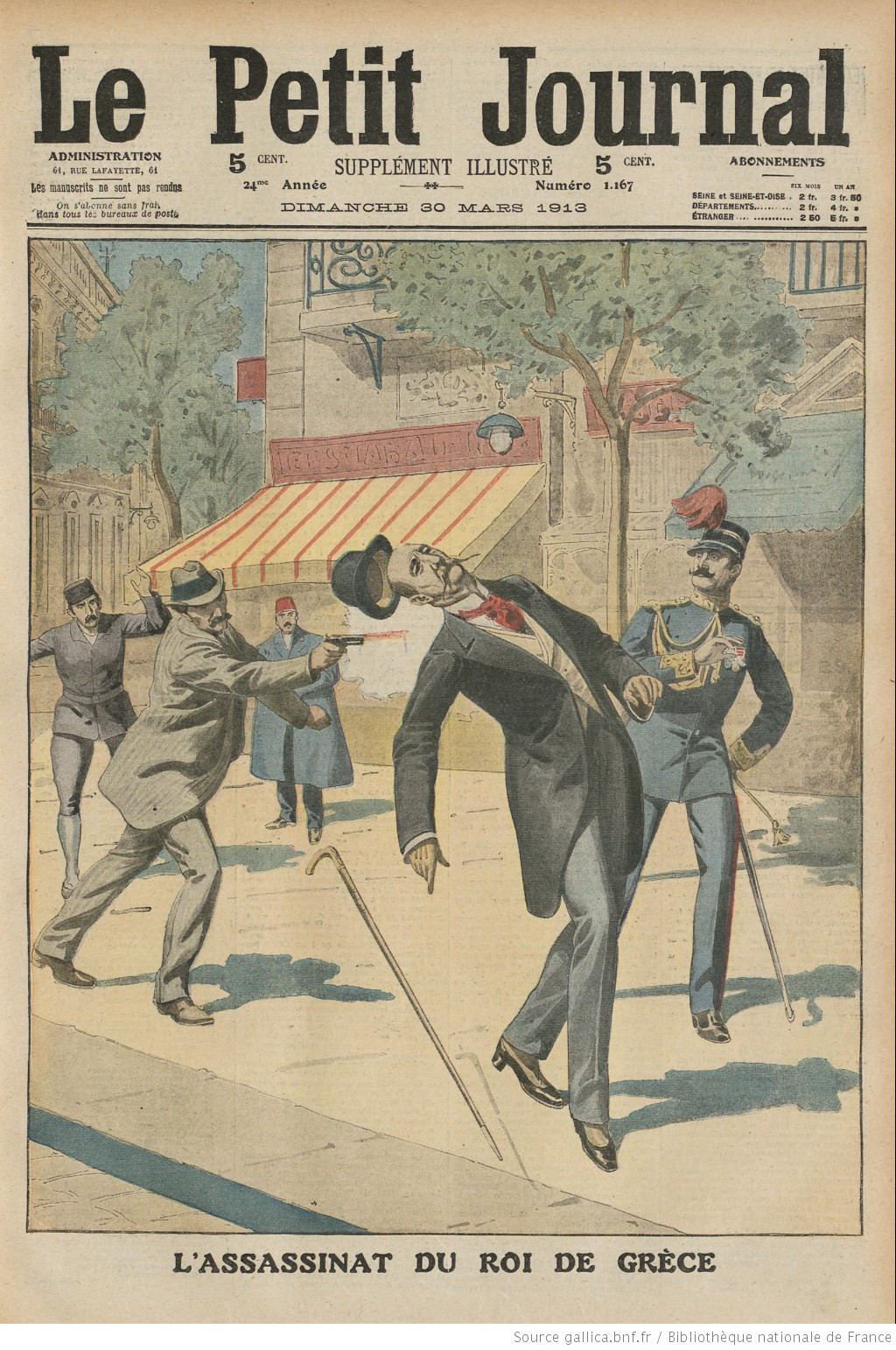
Reconstruction of the murder on the front page of Le Petit Journal (March 30, 1913).

Immediately after the assassination, Greece refused to attribute a political motive to Schinas' act. Aware that the assassination of the king in a city largely populated by Slavs could reignite tensions with Bulgaria, the Greek authorities targeted some Muslim and Jewish residents of Thessaloniki whom they held responsible. To pacify public opinion, the government eventually announced that the killer was Greek, describing Alexandros Schinas as a person of "low intelligence," a "degenerate criminal," and a "victim of alcoholism." This "official narrative" became the widely accepted portrayal of Schinas, depicting him as an alcoholic and homeless, with his motivation for the assassination of the king attributed to mental illness rather than political reasons. The authorities then attempted to suggest that he was an agent acting on behalf of a foreign power (Bulgaria, Germany, or the Ottoman Empire) without providing any evidence to support their claims.

The news of George I's death deeply shocked Greece. In Athens, newspapers were printed with black borders and carried eulogistic articles about the late monarch. All ministers expressed their condolences to Queen Olga, the widow of George I. She was in Athens when her husband was assassinated, and it was her son Andrew, daughter-in-law Alice, and grandson George who broke the news to her. (Note: Upon being informed, the Queen of the Hellenes begins to cry and calmly declares that what has just happened "is the will of God." She then decided to prepare to go to Thessaloniki the next day. In the Macedonian city, Olga and the royal family visit the scenes of the assassination and pay their respects to the monarch's body. The press of the time gives a slightly different account of the queen's reaction, with the Swiss newspaper La Liberté stating that upon learning of her husband's death, she burst into tears and fainted several times.) On March 19, the day after the King's assassination, all public establishments were closed, flags were flown at half-mast, cannon shots were fired at regular intervals to signify the national day of mourning, and death bells tolled. Meanwhile, in Athens, Eleftherios Venizelos announced before Parliament the accession to the throne of Crown Prince Constantine.

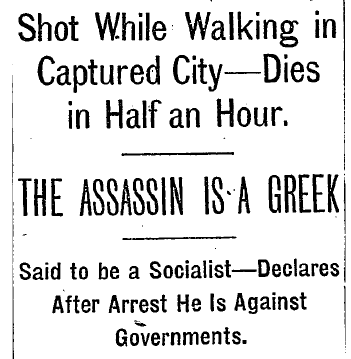
The New York Times headline reporting the assassination of George I (March 19, 1913).

In the hours and days following the news, the new King Constantine I received condolence telegrams from monarchs and heads of state worldwide. In Berlin, Emperor Wilhelm II, brother-in-law of the new king, decreed a three-week court mourning, and all officers of the Imperial German Navy observed an eight-day mourning period. In London, George I's death deeply affected Dowager Queen Alexandra, sister of the late monarch, who fainted immediately. The English-language press noted the successive deaths that had affected the queen since the death of her husband King Edward VII in 1910. (Note: Queen Alexandra experienced the loss of her son-in-law, the Duke of Fife (January 29, 1912), followed by the passing of her brother, King Frederick VIII of Denmark (May 14, 1912), and her nephew, Prince George of Cumberland (May 20, 1912).) In Brussels, the court mourned for twenty-one days, while in Paris, President of the Republic Raymond Poincaré and Prime Minister Aristide Briand sent telegrams of condolence to Constantine I. The French press unanimously condemned the attack. In the columns of Le Figaro, the day after the assassination of the King of the Hellenes, journalist Georges Bourdon wrote: "The death of this rare sovereign is a great loss for Greece, which will not be alone in feeling bitterness. Throughout the world, she has friends who, in her sorrow, mingle their mourning." (Note: In addition to the countries mentioned, courts across Europe are in mourning, and governments of many other nations are also paying tribute to King George I. Le Figaro, in its March 20, 1913 issue, highlights the special nature of these expressions of sympathy and condolences, particularly in the Balkan States and Russia. This is due to the close family ties that unite the imperial family with the royal family of Greece, as noted in the press and Parliaments.)

The assassination of George I is reminiscent of other attacks on monarchs and political figures at the turn of the 19th and 20th centuries, including King Umberto I of Italy (1900), Empress Elisabeth of Austria (1898), President of the French Republic Sadi Carnot (1894), and Emperor Alexander II of Russia (1881).

== Profile of Alexandros Schinas ==
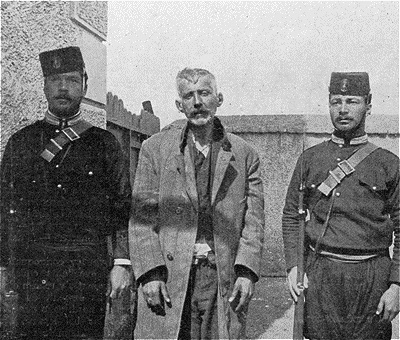
Alexandros Schinas, after his arrest (1913).

Although Alexandros Schinas is considered one of the most famous anarchist assassins of the early 20th century, his profile remains unclear, much like other infamous assassins such as Luigi Lucheni (who assassinated Empress Elisabeth of Austria) or Leon Czolgosz (who assassinated US President William McKinley). Various conspiracy theories, once propagated by the Greek authorities, have suggested that Schinas may have been an agent for the Ottomans, Bulgarians, the Dual Alliance (Germany and Austria-Hungary (Note: Constantine, the crown prince, is described as "very Prussian" and is married to the German princess Sophia of Prussia. He is suspected of sympathizing with Germany, which is seen as detrimental to Greece.)), or Macedonian nationalists. However, no concrete evidence has surfaced to support these claims, and no nationalist group claimed responsibility for the assassination of King George I. Experts point out that the assassination disrupted the fragile peace between Greeks and Bulgarians, and that King George I had already planned to abdicate in favor of Constantine at his upcoming golden jubilee, making any intervention by the Dual Alliance unnecessary to secure Constantine's succession to the throne.

The government of Greece initially denied any political motive for the regicide, but during an interview in prison, a journalist asked Alexandros Schinas, "Are you an anarchist?" Schinas responded:

"No, no! I am not an anarchist, but a socialist. I embraced socialism while studying medicine in Athens. It happened gradually, almost imperceptibly. I believe that all good and educated individuals are socialists. To me, the philosophy of medicine is intertwined with socialism."

Other theories about the reasons for the assassination have emerged. Some suggest that it was a revenge act against the king, who allegedly refused a government aid request from Schinas in 1911. Another theory is that Schinas lost a significant inheritance on the Greek stock market, and he was in poor health and discouraged before the attack. An article in The New York Times in 1914, discussing recent political assassinations, does not mention Schinas among the "anarchists who believe in militant tactics." However, it describes the assassin of George I as "a Greek named Alexandros Schinas who was probably half demented."

Alexandros Schinas himself attributed his actions to "delusions" caused by tuberculosis:

"At night, I would wake up feeling like I was losing my mind. I had an overwhelming desire to destroy the world and harm everyone because I saw society as my enemy. It was purely coincidental that I encountered the king in this disturbed state of mind. If I had come across my sister that day, I would have been willing to harm her as well."

Tortured and subjected to examinations during his detention, Alexandros Schinas refused to name any accomplices. According to the Greek newspaper I Kathimerini, he informed Queen Olga in a private meeting that he acted alone. The newspaper also mentions that Schinas made statements after his arrest, but unfortunately, the transcriptions were lost in a fire on the ship transporting them to Piraeus. In a prison interview, Schinas also denied any premeditation. (Note: He declares, "No! I killed the king by chance. (sic) I was walking like a dead man, not knowing where I was going. Suddenly, I turned my head and saw the king and his adjutant behind me. I slowed down my pace as the king passed very close to me. I let him pass and then immediately fired.")

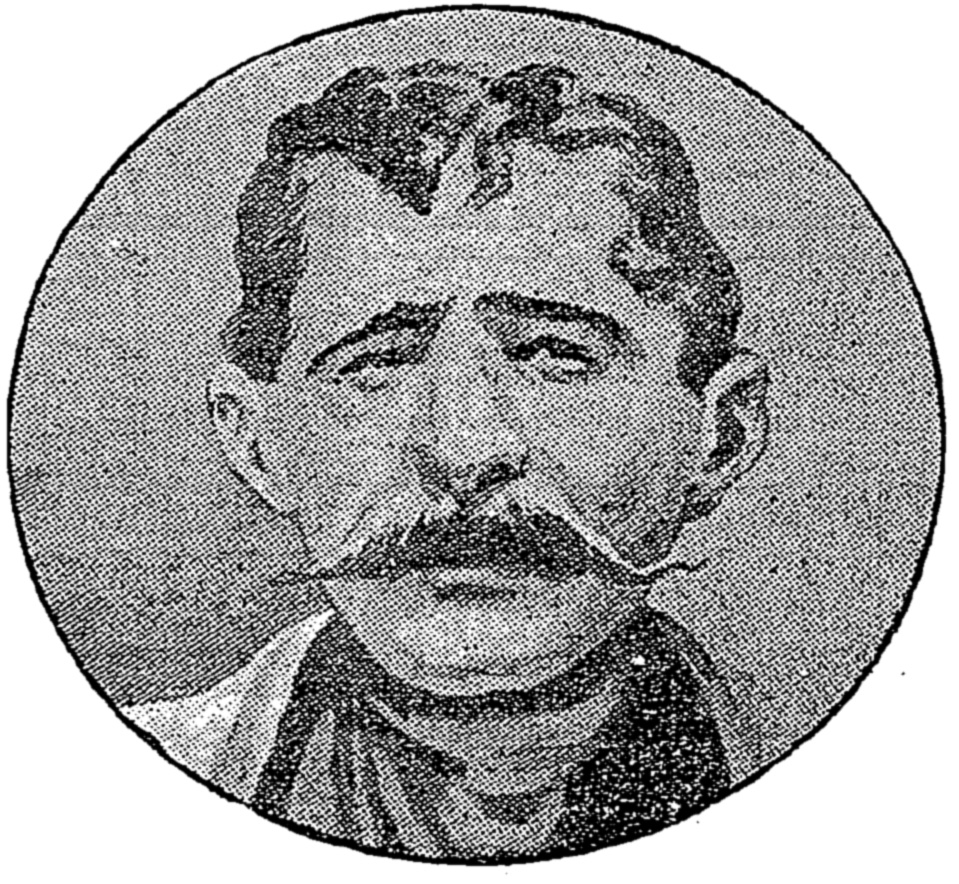
Portrait of Alexandros Schinas published in The New York Times (April 13, 1913).

On May 6, 1913, six weeks after his arrest, Alexandros Schinas died by throwing himself out of the window of the examining magistrate's office at the Thessaloniki gendarmerie. Authorities claimed that Schinas, who was not handcuffed, took advantage of a moment of distraction from his guards to run and jump out the window, falling nine meters. Some speculate that Schinas committed suicide to avoid further torture and a slow death from tuberculosis, while others suggest he may have been thrown out the window by the gendarmes to silence him. Following his death, his ear and hand were amputated for identification purposes, preserved, and later exhibited at the Athens Museum of Criminology.

In the 21st century, Schinas is often portrayed as an anarchist driven by political motives. However, in 2014, Michael Newton provided a more nuanced perspective, highlighting the torture Schinas endured during his detention, which led to a "confused confession blending anarchist beliefs with a claim of regicide due to a financial dispute." Similarly, in 2018, Michael Kemp questioned Schinas's association with anarchism or propaganda of the deed, noting that the terms "socialism" and "anarchism" were used interchangeably at the time. Reports of Schinas seeking government assistance or investing in the stock market do not align with theories of his socialist or anarchist leanings. (Note: Michael Kemp wrote: "In the nineteenth century, the terms 'socialism' and 'anarchism' were frequently used interchangeably. Despite the substantial difference between ideologies focused on reforming the state and those advocating for its complete abolition, many public figures and newspaper articles of that era overlooked this distinction. Socialism and anarchism were perceived as significant social and political threats in the public and media discourse at the time [...].") Kemp suggests that Schinas, rather than being part of a larger political or state conspiracy, may have been a troubled individual seeking to escape the harsh realities of the early 20th century, both mentally and physically unwell.

== Repatriation and funeral in Athens ==
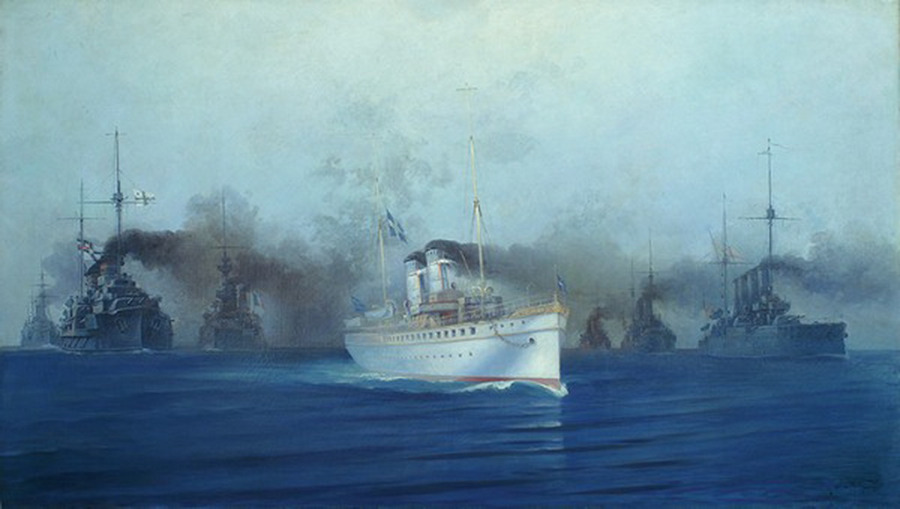
Transport of the remains of King George I by the Amphitrite and her escort (Vassileios Chatzis, 1913).

After the attack, the body of the sovereign was embalmed and placed in a small room near the hospital entrance. On the evening of the assassination, the body was transferred from the hospital to the palace. George I's remains were covered with the Greek flag and placed on a stretcher, carried alternately by Prince Nicolas, the king's aides-de-camp, senior officers, civilian, and religious authorities. The procession passed by the site of the assassination before arriving at the palace at 10 pm. A battalion paid respects, and the body was placed in a salon on the mezzanine. The Metropolis of Thessaloniki, Gennadios Alexiadis, offered a prayer, followed by civilian and military authorities silently passing by the monarch's coffin.

The king's body was brought back to Athens on his yacht, Amphitrite IV, accompanied by a flotilla of warships. The repatriation of the royal remains occurred on March 25, 1913, and was marked by a significant ceremony in Thessaloniki. Starting from the palace at 9 am, the procession, with traditional evzones forming the special guard of the deceased monarch, proceeded to the port amidst a large and solemn crowd. The coffin, draped in the national flag with the crown placed at the head, was carried on a cannon carriage. Following the coffin was the royal family, with the princes and the new king themselves carrying the body onto the Amphitrite at the port. On the royal yacht, the Metropolitan delivered a speech honoring a king "fallen in the line of duty." The Amphitrite then sailed to Piraeus, accompanied by three Greek destroyers, the Russian gunboat Uralets, the German battlecruiser Goeben, the British cruiser Yarmouth, the French cruiser Bruix, and the Italian cruiser San Giorgio.

Delayed by fog, the Amphitrite arrived in Athens on March 27 just before noon. The high dignitaries of the court and the kingdom awaited the ship at the dock to pay their respects to the monarch's remains. As the coffin was disembarked, the batteries fired salvos. George I's body, as in Thessaloniki, was placed on a cannon carriage and pulled by Greek sailors. Constantine I followed the coffin, preceded by the Holy Synod. The procession included princes, the Lutheran minister, ministers, foreign consuls, and civilian and military authorities. Queens Olga, the widow of George I, and Sophia, the wife of Constantine, along with the princesses of the royal family, followed in carriages.

At the train station, the sovereign's body was placed in a mortuary car painted white with mauve side bands. As the special train departed for the capital, cannons from foreign ships anchored in Piraeus, along with Greek batteries, fired salute rounds. In Athens, the procession moved through a massive crowd to the Cathedral of the Annunciation. Following a religious ceremony, the coffin, adorned with the flags of Greece and Denmark (the countries of George I's birth), was placed in a chapel and publicly displayed for three days.

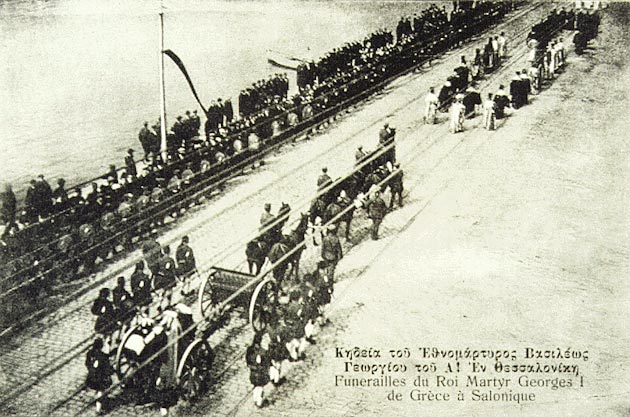
George I's funeral (1913).

The solemn funeral of King George I took place on April 2, 1913, in Athens, before a massive crowd. The Cathedral of the Annunciation was heavily adorned with funeral wreaths. The royal coffin rested in front of the altar on a small platform draped in violet, with six aides-de-camp of the king guarding it. Among the foreign guests were notable figures such as the Crown Prince of Romania, the Crown Prince of Bulgaria, Prince Henry of Prussia, the Crown Prince of Serbia, Prince Alexander of Teck, Prince Valdemar of Denmark (the late king's brother), Prince Roland Bonaparte, the Infant Charles of Spain, Grand Duke Dmitri Constantinovich of Russia (the late king's brother-in-law), the Duke of Cumberland (the late king's brother-in-law), and the Count of Turin. After the religious ceremony, the procession headed to the Larissa station, where a special train would return George I's body to the Tatoi Royal Palace. The coffin was once again placed on a cannon carriage and pulled by a detachment of sailors. It was followed on foot by clergy members, the king, Greek and foreign princes, and several carriages. (Note: In the first car are Queen Dowager Olga and her daughter, Grand Duchess Marie; in the second car, Princess Marie Bonaparte (wife of Prince George) and Princess Helen of Greece; and in the third car, Grand Duchess Elena Vladimirovna of Russia (wife of Prince Nicholas) and Princess Alice of Battenberg (wife of Prince Andrew).) The monarch's body was then buried in the gardens of the Tatoi Palace, a place George I particularly loved.

== Consequences ==
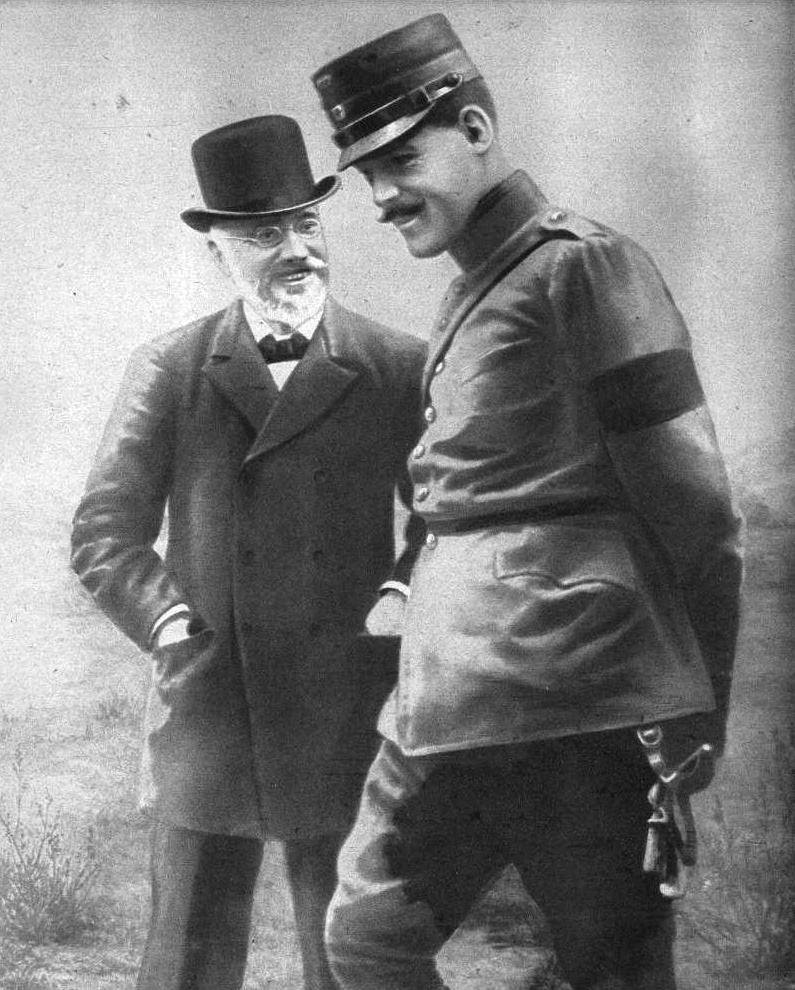
Eleftherios Venizelos (left) and Constantine I (right) in 1913.

While the Greeks mourned the death of King George I, they were enthusiastic about Constantine ascending to the throne. According to the 1911 Constitution, he was sworn in as King of the Hellenes on March 21, 1913, before the Hellenic Parliament. The end of the First Balkan War and the signing of the Treaty of London on May 30, 1913, led to significant expansion for the Kingdom of Greece: acquiring a large part of Macedonia (including Thessaloniki) and Epirus, as well as Crete and most of the Aegean Islands. However, peace remained uncertain, and a second Balkan War, this time against the Kingdom of Bulgaria, erupted on June 16, 1913.

Constantine I had a different personality from his father, George I, and his opposition to Prime Minister Eleftherios Venizelos caused political difficulties. Constantine lacked training in state affairs, leading to disastrous consequences during World War I. The conflict between Constantine I and Venizelos resulted in the National Schism, a civil conflict that some historians believe could have been avoided if George I had not been assassinated by Alexandros Schinas. Constantine I was forced to abdicate in 1917 after Allied forces threatened to bombard Athens. He passed the throne to his second son, Alexander I, and moved to Switzerland with his wife Sophia and their other children. Following Alexander I's unexpected death, Constantine returned to power after Venizelos's defeat in the 1920 legislative elections and a plebiscite. However, Greece's military failure in the Greco-Turkish War led Constantine to abdicate permanently in 1922 and go into exile in Italy, where he died a few months later. His eldest son, George II, briefly succeeded him before also renouncing the throne.

The assassination of George I marked the end of his nearly 50-year reign, making it the longest in modern Greek history. Excluding Alexander I, who was a puppet king under Eleftherios Venizelos' influence, and Paul I, the only monarch to reign uninterrupted from enthronement to natural death, George I's successors all faced exile. (Note: Constantine I was exiled from Greece between 1917 and 1920, and again from 1922 until he died in 1923. George II was in exile from 1924 to 1935 after the monarchy fell, and then from 1941 to 1946 during the occupation of Greece by Axis Powers. Constantine II was banned from Greece from 1967 to at least 1993.) After World War I and the Greco-Turkish War, Greece experienced a brief period of republicanism from 1924 to 1935. Subsequently, the country endured a civil war from 1946 to 1949 and a military dictatorship from 1967 to 1974, which led to the definitive abolition of the monarchy in 1973. A referendum in the following year confirmed the establishment of the Third Republic.

== Legacy and tributes ==
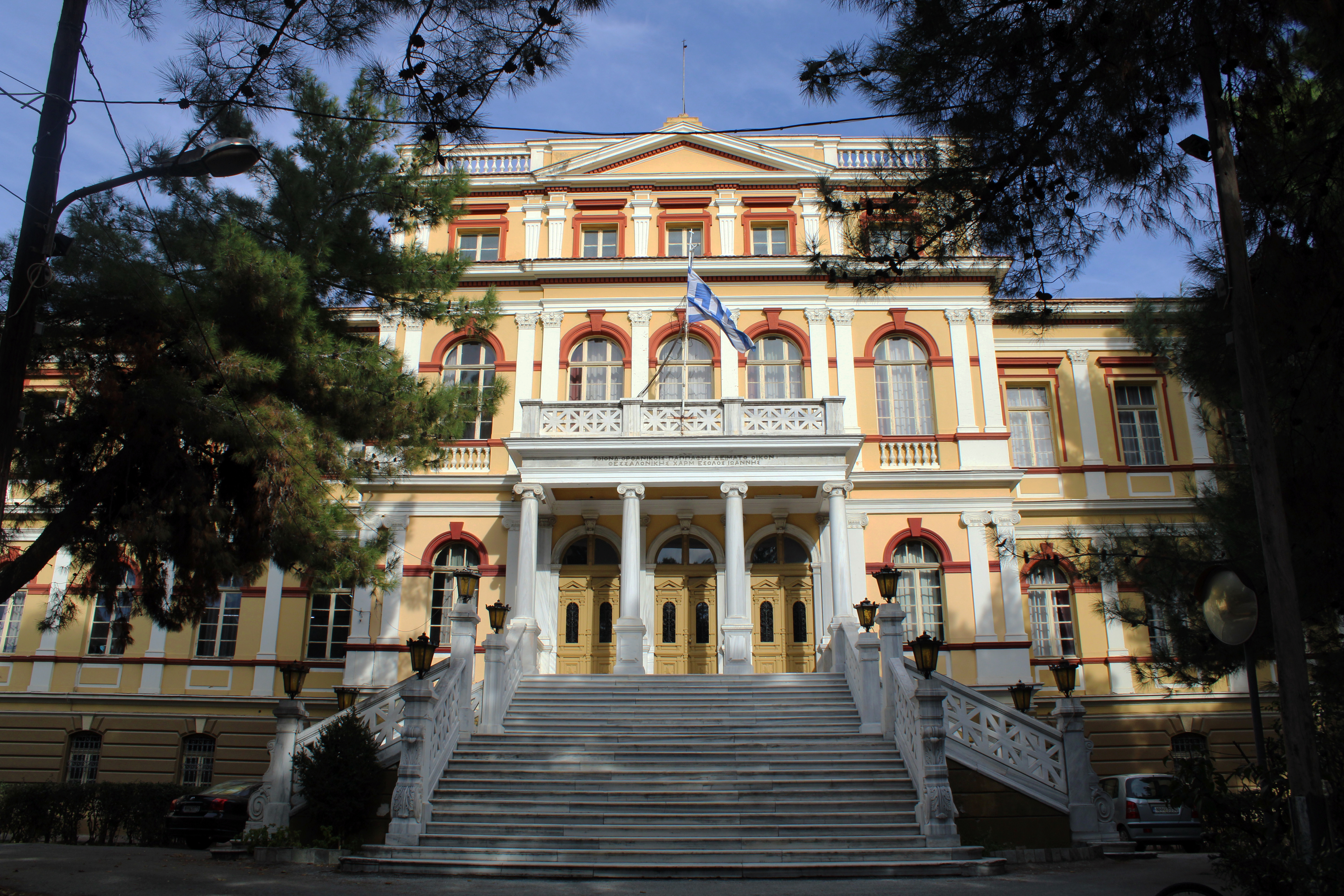
The Papafeio orphanage (2020), where the body of George I was taken after his assassination.

In 1915, a commemorative marble bust of King George I was erected at the assassination site in Thessaloniki, on a street now named Vasiléos Georgíou ("King George Street"). The bust, designed by sculptor Konstantinos Dimitriadis, is the oldest outdoor sculpture in the city.

Since 1960, a room at the Papafeio orphanage, a former military hospital where the body of George I was taken after the assassination by Alexandros Schinas, has been transformed into a small museum dedicated to the first King of the Hellenes.

In 2013, to mark the centenary of the king's assassination, the Hellenic Post released a series of ten commemorative envelopes featuring his image. One of these envelopes was presented to King Constantine II, the great-grandson of George I and the final sovereign of Greece.

The Crown series briefly references the assassination of George I, the grandfather of Prince Philip, Duke of Edinburgh, in the episodes "Smoke and Mirrors" (season 1, episode 5) and "A Company of Men" (season 2, episode 2).

The assassination is mentioned in sixth chapter of the video game Reverse: 1999.

== See also ==
- History of Thessaloniki
- List of assassinations

== Bibliography ==
=== Assassination ===
- Αναστασιάδης, Γιώργος Ο (2010). "Η δολοφονία του βασιλιά Γεώργιου Α' (1913)". Το παλίμψηστο του αίματος : πολιτικές δολοφονίες και εκτελέσεις στη Θεσσαλονίκη (1913–1968) (in Greek) (1st ed.). Επίκεντρο. ISBN 9789604582808. OCLC 713835670.
- Ashdown, Dulcie M (2011). Royal Murders : Hatred, Revenge and the Seizing of Power. The History Press. ISBN 9780752469195. OCLC 779141017.
- des Cars, Jean (2014). "En Grèce, le souverain, héros de la guerre balkanique, est victime de sa modestie". Le Sceptre et le Sang : Rois et reines dans la tourmente des deux guerres mondiales (in French). Paris: Perrin. pp. 46–47. ISBN 978-2-262-04110-6.
- Μέγας, Γιάννης (2020). "18 Μαρτίου 1913 : Δολοφονία του βασιλιά Γεώργιου". Απαγωγές και δολοφονίες στη Θεσσαλονίκη 1852-1913 (in Greek). University Studio Press. pp. 247–258. ISBN 978-960-12-2510-4.
- Newton, Michael (2014). "George I of Greece (1845-1913)". Famous Assassinations in World History : An Encyclopedia [2 volumes]. ABC-Clio. pp. 179–181. ISBN 9781610692861. OCLC 957637380.
- Προυσσιώτη, Αρίστη (2013). Οι δολοφονίες του βασιλέως Γεωργίου Α' : Επάλληλες αναδιηγήσεις (in Greek). Athens: Μελάνι. ISBN 9789609530422.
- West, Nigel (2017). "George I". Encyclopedia of political assassinations. Rowman & Littlefield. p. 83. ISBN 9781538102381. OCLC 980219049.

=== George I and his family ===
- Christmas, Captain Walter (1914). King George of Greece. New York: MacBride, Naste & Company.
- Greece, Christopher (2021). Ma famille côté cours (in French). Paris: Lacurne. ISBN 978-2-35603-025-2.
- de Kertanguy, Inès (2023). Princesse Alice de Battenberg : Le tragique destin de la mère du prince Philip (in French). Paris: Presses de la Cité. ISBN 978-2-258-20066-1.
- Kreuter, Peter Mario (2014). "From Dybbøl to Thessaloniki : George I, King of the Hellenes, and the Fate of War". The Changing Places and Faces of War. Brill Publishers. pp. 87–116. doi:10.1163/9781848882966_006. ISBN 9781848882966. OCLC 904802285.
- Sáinz de Medrano, Ricardo Mateos (2004). La Familia de la Reina Sofía : La Dinastía griega, la Casa de Hannover y los reales primos de Europa (in Spanish). Madrid: La Esfera de los Libros. ISBN 978-84-9734-195-0.
- Van der Kiste, John (1994). Kings of the Hellenes : The Greek Kings, 1863-1974. Sutton Publishing. ISBN 0750921471.
- Vickers, Hugo (2000). Alice : Princess Andrew of Greece. Londres: Hamish Hamilton. ISBN 0-241-13686-5.

=== Anarchist movement ===
- Bach Jensen, Richard (2015). "Anarchist terrorism and counter-terrorism in Europe and the world, 1878–1934". The Routledge History of Terrorism. Routledge. pp. 111–129. ISBN 9781317514879. OCLC 951551065.
- Bach Jensen, Richard (2016). "Historical lessons : an overview of early anarchism and lone actor terrorism". Understanding Lone Actor Terrorism : Past Experience, Future Outlook, and Response Strategies. Routledge. pp. 29–45. ISBN 9781317328612. OCLC 947086466.
- Kemp, Michael (2018). "Beneath a White Tower". Bombs, Bullets and Bread : The Politics of Anarchist Terrorism Worldwide, 1866–1926. McFarland & Company. pp. 178–186. ISBN 9781476671017. OCLC 1043054028.
- Mattox, Henry E (2015). Chronology of World Terrorism, 1901–2001. McFarland & Company. ISBN 9781476609652. OCLC 910878829.

=== History of Greece ===
- Clogg, Richard (1992). A Concise History of Modern Greece. Cambridge: University Press. ISBN 978-0-521-00479-4.
- Dakin, Douglas (1972). The Unification of Greece, 1770-1923. Ernest Benn Limited. ISBN 9780510263119. OCLC 2656514.
- Driault, Édouard; Lhéritier, Michel (1926a). Histoire diplomatique de la Grèce de 1821 à nos jours : Le Règne de Georges Ier avant le traité de Berlin (1862–1878) – Hellénisme et slavisme (in French). Vol. III. PUF.
- Driault, Édouard; Lhéritier, Michel (1926b). Histoire diplomatique de la Grèce de 1821 à nos jours : Suite du règne de Georges Ier jusqu'à la Révolution turque (1878–1908) – Hellénisme et Germanisme (in French). Vol. IV. PUF.
- Driault, Édouard; Lhéritier, Michel (1926c). Histoire diplomatique de la Grèce de 1821 à nos jours : La Grèce et la Grande Guerre – De la Révolution turque au traité de Lausanne (1908–1923) (in French). Vol. V. PUF.
- Gallant, Thomas W (2001). Modern Greece. Londres: Arnold. ISBN 9780340763360. OCLC 248722096.
- Kaloudis, George (2019). Navigating Turbulent Waters : Greek Politics in the Era of Eleftherios Venizelos. Rowman & Littlefield. ISBN 9781498587396. OCLC 1108993066.
