= White Tower of Thessaloniki =

White Tower
- Λευκός Πύργος; Beyaz Kule; Kuli Blanka
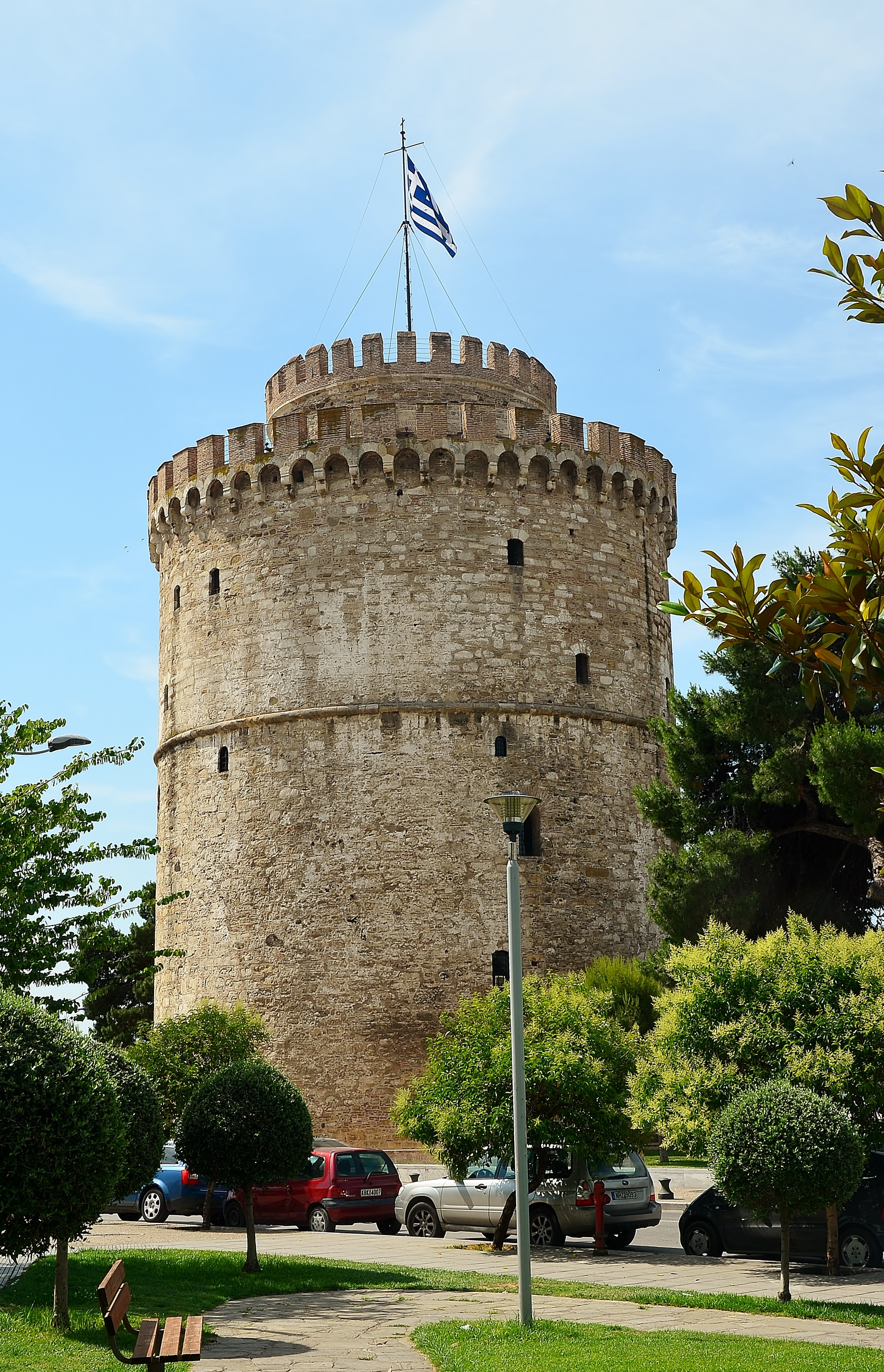
- The White Tower c. 2015

General information
- Status: Museum
- Type: Fortress; garrison; prison
- Architectural style: Byzantine and Early Ottoman
- Location: Thessaloniki, Greece
- Coordinates: 40°37′35″N 22°56′54″E
- Completed: c. 15th century

Height
- Height: 33.9 m (111 ft)

Dimensions
- Diameter: 22.7 m (74 ft)

Technical details
- Floor count: 6

The White Tower of Thessaloniki (Greek: Λευκός Πύργος Lefkós Pýrgos; Turkish: Beyaz Kule; Ladino: Kuli Blanka) is a monument and museum on the waterfront of the city of Thessaloniki, capital of the region of Macedonia in northern Greece. The present tower likely replaced an old Byzantine fortification, known to have been mentioned around the 12th century, that the Ottoman Empire reconstructed to fortify the city's fortress some time after Sultan Murad II captured Thessaloniki in 1430. During the period of Ottoman rule, the tower became a notorious prison and the scene of numerous mass executions, most famously of the Janissaries who revolted during the reign of Mahmud II.

In 1912, as Greece gained control over the city, the White Tower was substantially remodeled and its exterior was whitewashed. The White Tower has been adopted as the symbol of the city.

== Physical attributes ==
The White Tower takes the form of a cylindrical drum 23 m (75 ft) in diameter with a height of 34 m (112 ft) above ground level, on top of which is a turret 12 m (39 ft) in diameter and 6 m (20 ft) high. Some of the embrasures in the outer wall of the tower are reached by a spiral ramp; others are accessed from a central room on each of the six floors.

The turret houses a platform with a diameter of 10 m (33 ft), and the platform at the top of the main tower in front of the turret is about 5 m (16 ft) wide.

== History ==
=== Origins ===
The present tower likely replaced an older Byzantine tower mentioned by the 12th-century archbishop Eustathius of Thessalonica during the sack of the city in 1185. The present tower which once guarded the eastern end of the city's sea walls was for many years attributed to Venice, to which the Byzantines ceded Thessaloniki in 1423. It is now known that the tower was constructed by the Ottomans sometime after the army of Sultan Murad II captured Thessaloniki in 1430. Until 1912, an inscription in Ottoman Turkish verse above the door attributed the tower's construction to AH 942 (1535–1536) on the orders of Sultan Suleiman.

Historian Franz Babinger speculated that the structure was designed by the Ottoman architect Mimar Sinan, who is known to have built fortifications, including a similar tower at the Albanian port Valona in 1537. This dating is supported by historian Michel Kiel, though he states that Sinan's involvement cannot be ascertained. Another study by French scholars estimates a date between 1450 and 1470, arguing that the 16th-century inscription refers only to an outer chemise.

=== Modifications ===
The Ottoman-built structure itself has been altered substantially over the years. Early illustrations show that it was originally covered by a conical roof, like similar towers in the Yedikule Fortress and Rumelihisarı fortress in Istanbul.

Until its demolition in 1917, a chemise stood at the foot of the tower, supporting the heavy guns and enclosing an area at least three times the diameter of the main tower. Octagonal turrets on the chemise and caponiers at ground level provided flanking fire around the tower. It is unclear whether the chemise was part of the original scheme for the tower or was a later addition.

The tower was for centuries part of the walls of the old city of Thessaloniki, separating the Jewish quarter of the city from the cemeteries of the Muslims and Jews. The city walls were demolished in 1866.

=== From the Red Tower to the White Tower ===
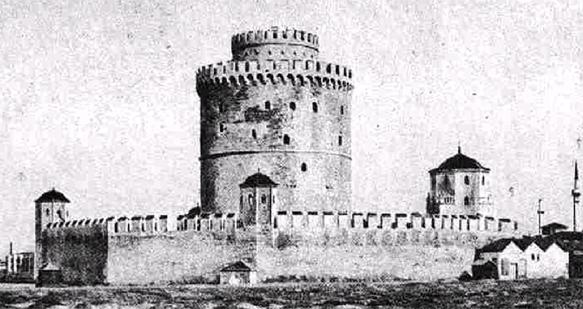
The White Tower in 1912, showing the chemise that surrounded the tower until its demolition in 1917

The Tower was used by the Ottomans successively as a fortress, garrison and a prison. In 1826, at the order of the Sultan Mahmud II, there was a massacre of the rebellious Janissaries imprisoned there. Owing to the "countless victims of Ottoman torturers and executioners", the tower acquired the name "Tower of Blood" or "Red Tower" (Turkish: Kanlı Kule), a name which it kept until the end of the 19th century.

The current name of The White Tower came to be in 1890, when it was whitewashed by a convict in exchange for his freedom. It has had many names over the centuries: "Lions Tower" in the 16th century, the "Fortress of Kalamaria" in the 18th century, and the "Janissary Tower" and the "Blood Tower" in the 19th century as it served as a prison and place of execution for long term convicts. After the incorporation of Thessaloniki into Greece in 1912, the tower became the symbol of the city.

King George I of Greece was assassinated not far from the White Tower in March 1913.

The Tower is now a buff colour but has retained the name White Tower. It now stands on Thessaloniki's waterfront boulevard, Nikis (Victory) Street. It houses a museum dedicated to the history of Thessaloniki and is one of the city's leading tourist attractions.

== White Tower Museum ==
The White Tower houses an exhibition dedicated to the city of Thessaloniki and its history throughout various periods, organized by the city's Museum of Byzantine Culture. It is under the administration of the Ephorate of Byzantine Antiquities of the Greek Ministry of Culture.

The Tower is open to the public, and visitors have the opportunity to view a map of the city with monuments and museums, a timeline with events relevant to Thessaloniki, scientific articles of distinguished historians and archaeologists, bibliography etc. School excursions may be arranged by contacting the Byzantine Museum.

== Depiction ==
Unofficial souvenir banknote from the Republic of Macedonia depicting the White Tower of Thessaloniki, c. 1992

In the 1990s, the White Tower was depicted on various objects, including T-shirts and posters, in the Republic of Macedonia (now North Macedonia).

According to historian Donald Sassoon, banknotes depicting the White Tower were created by extreme nationalist organizations in the Republic of Macedonia. VMRO-DPMNE proposed the White Tower-depicting banknotes' official adoption. However, the government in Skopje rejected its official use and adopted a different design for the new denar, which was issued in 1992.

IMPRES printed unofficial banknotes depicting the White Tower, which were sold as souvenirs on the streets of Skopje, bearing the disclaimer, "This is a souvenir banknote and not for official use."

== Gallery ==
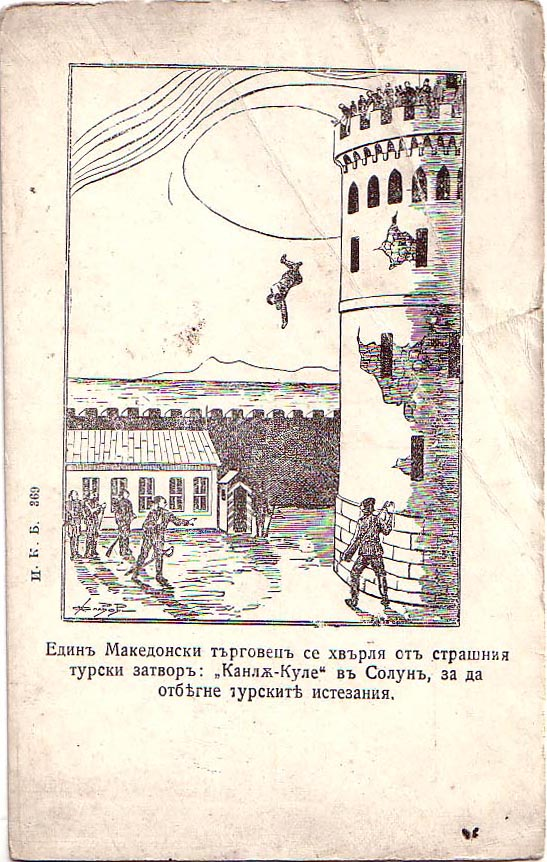
Bulgarian postcard from the late 19th century. The caption reads: A Macedonian merchant jumps from the scary Turkish prison "Blood Tower" in Salonica, to escape Turkish tortures.

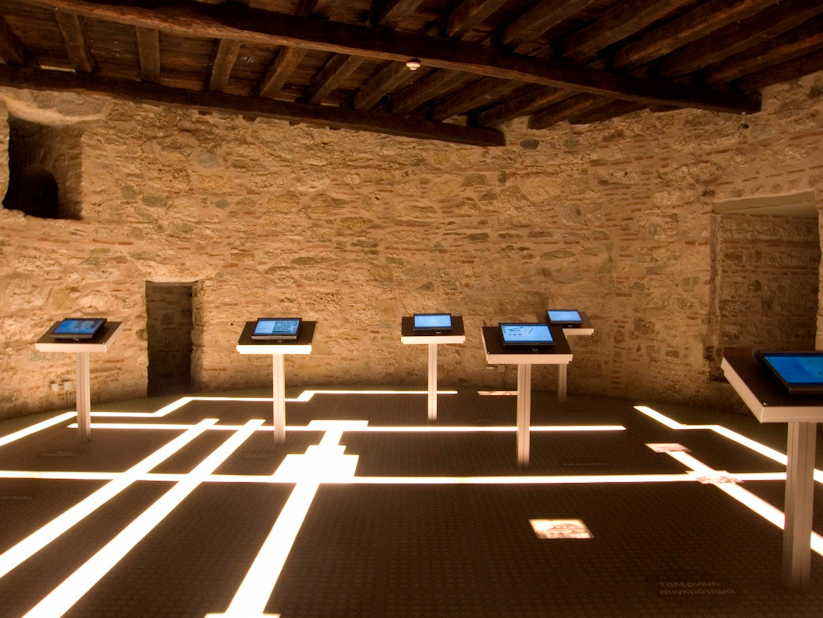
Second floor gallery

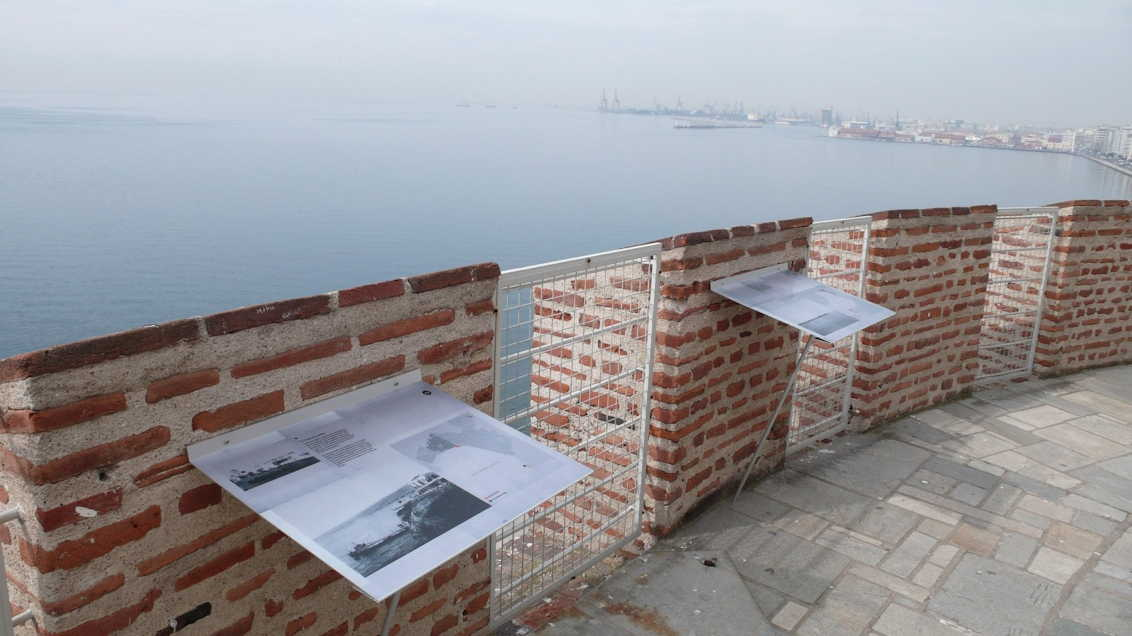
Roof

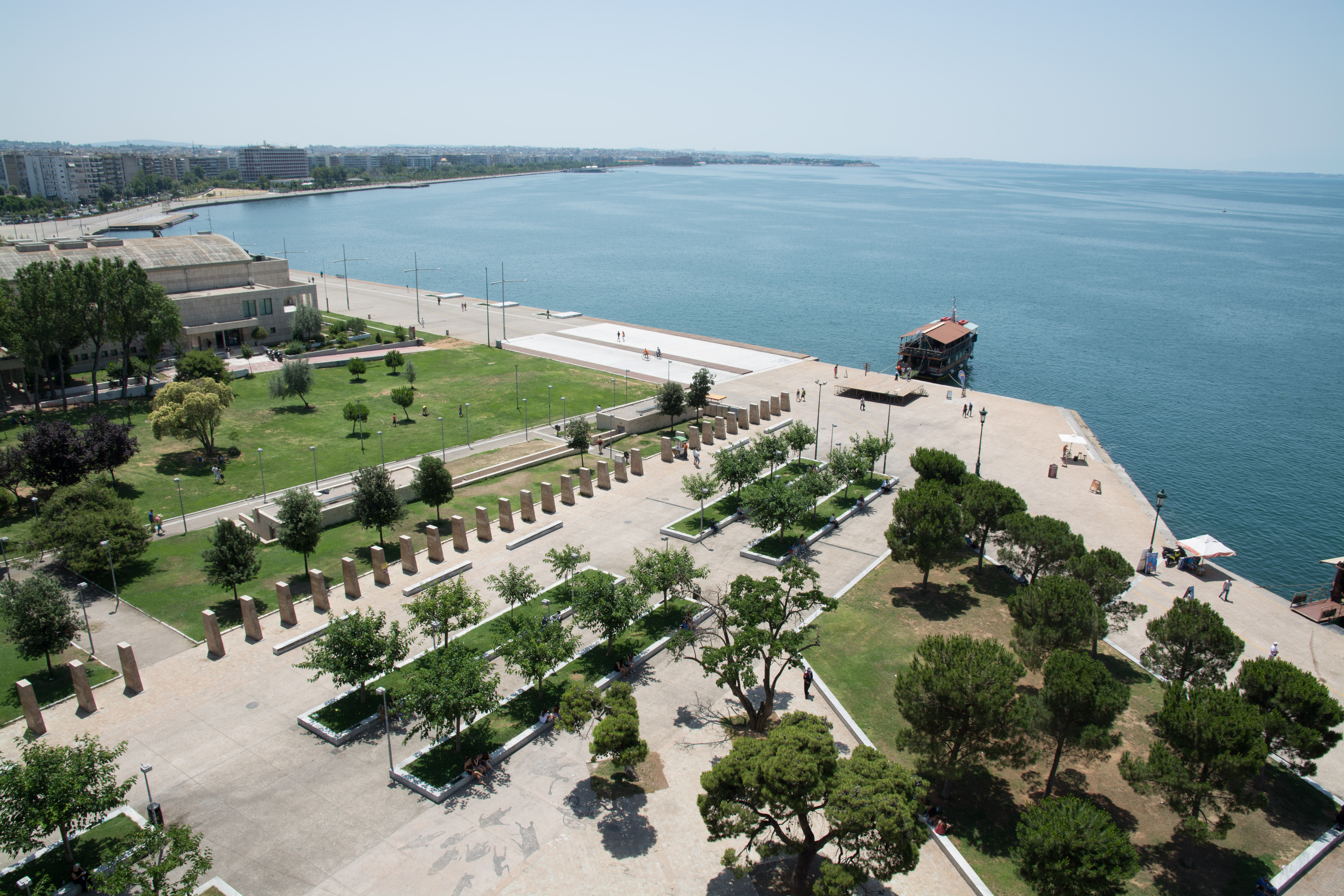
View from the roof

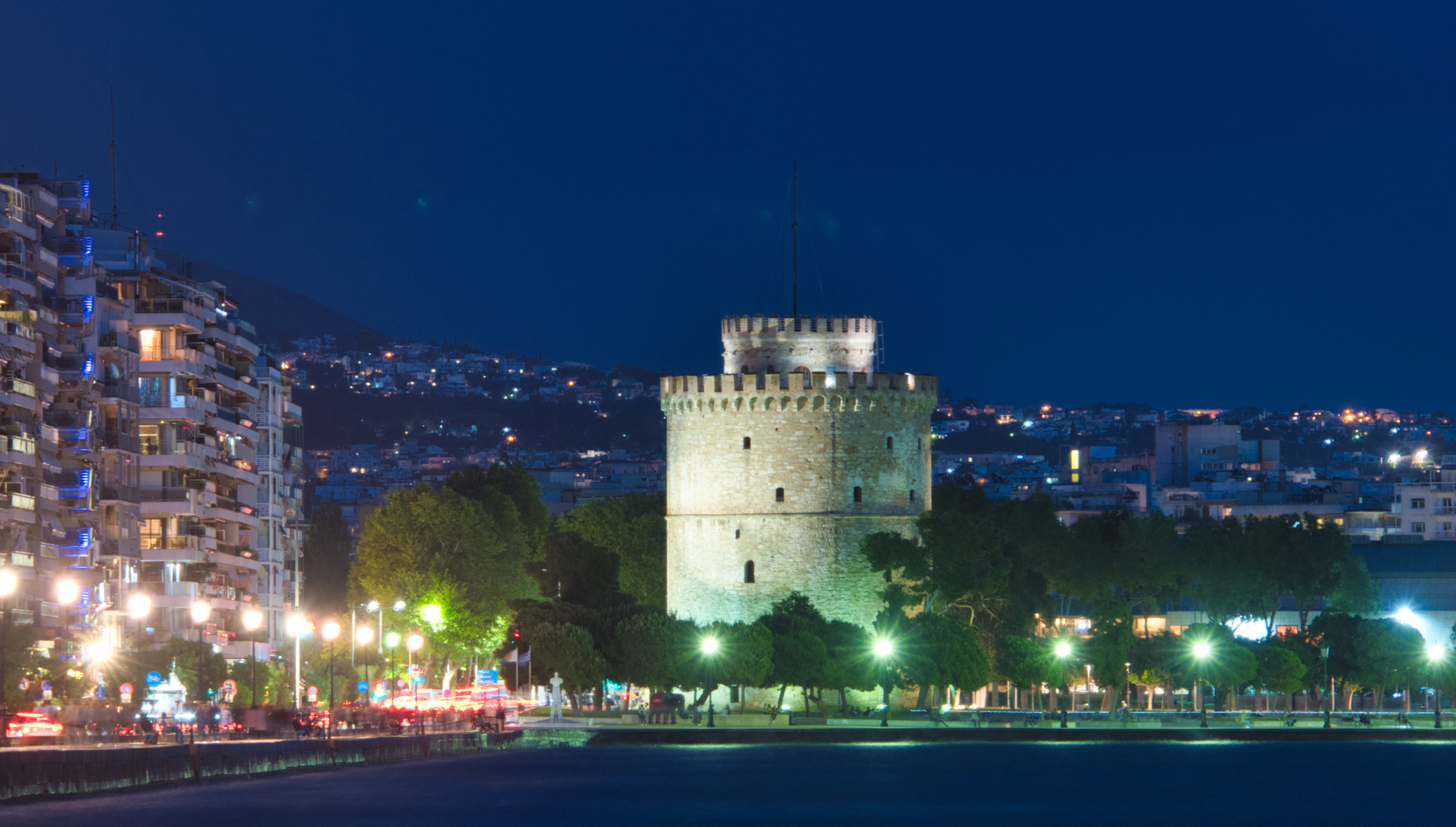
Night view

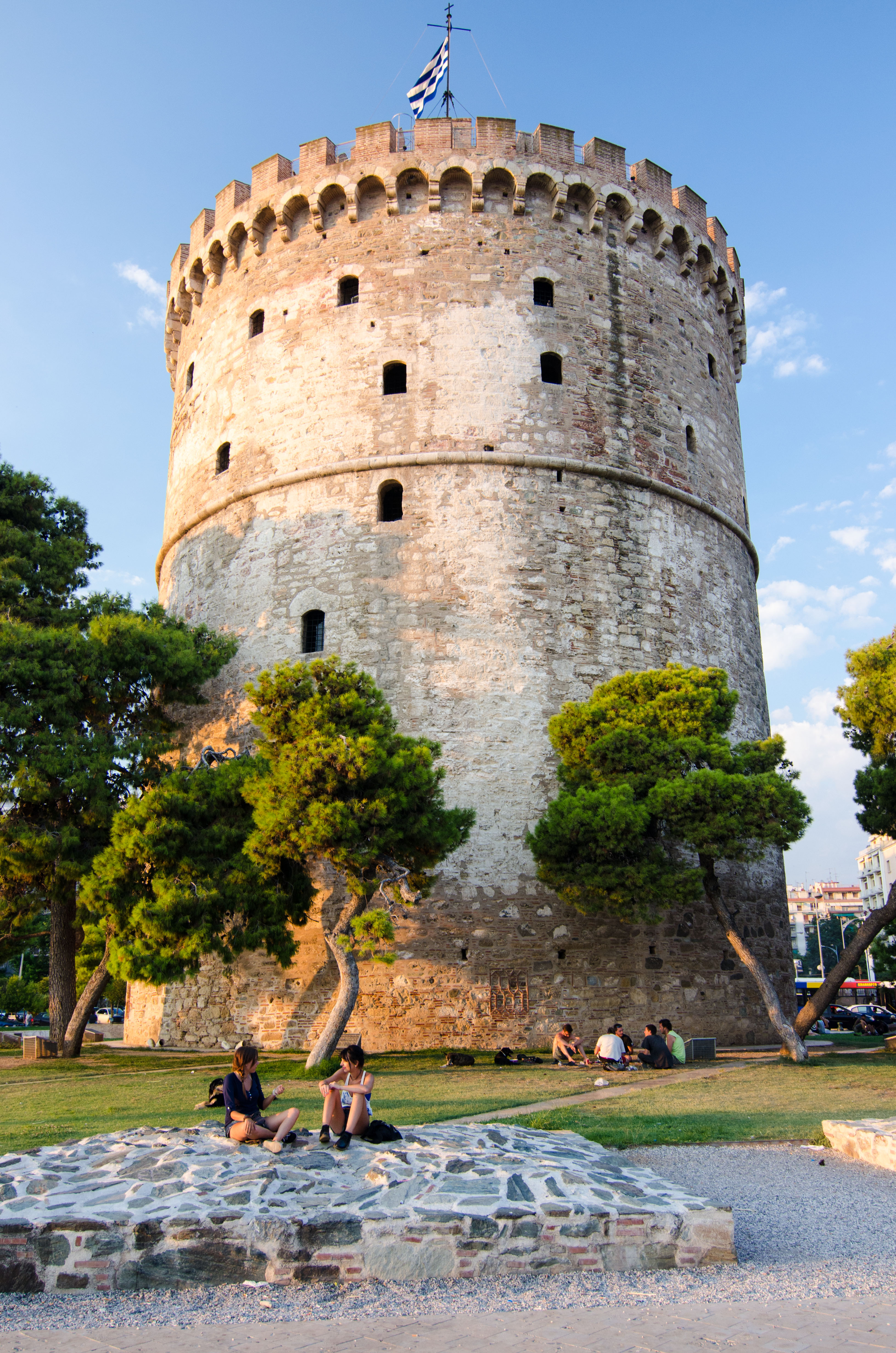
White Tower in 2013

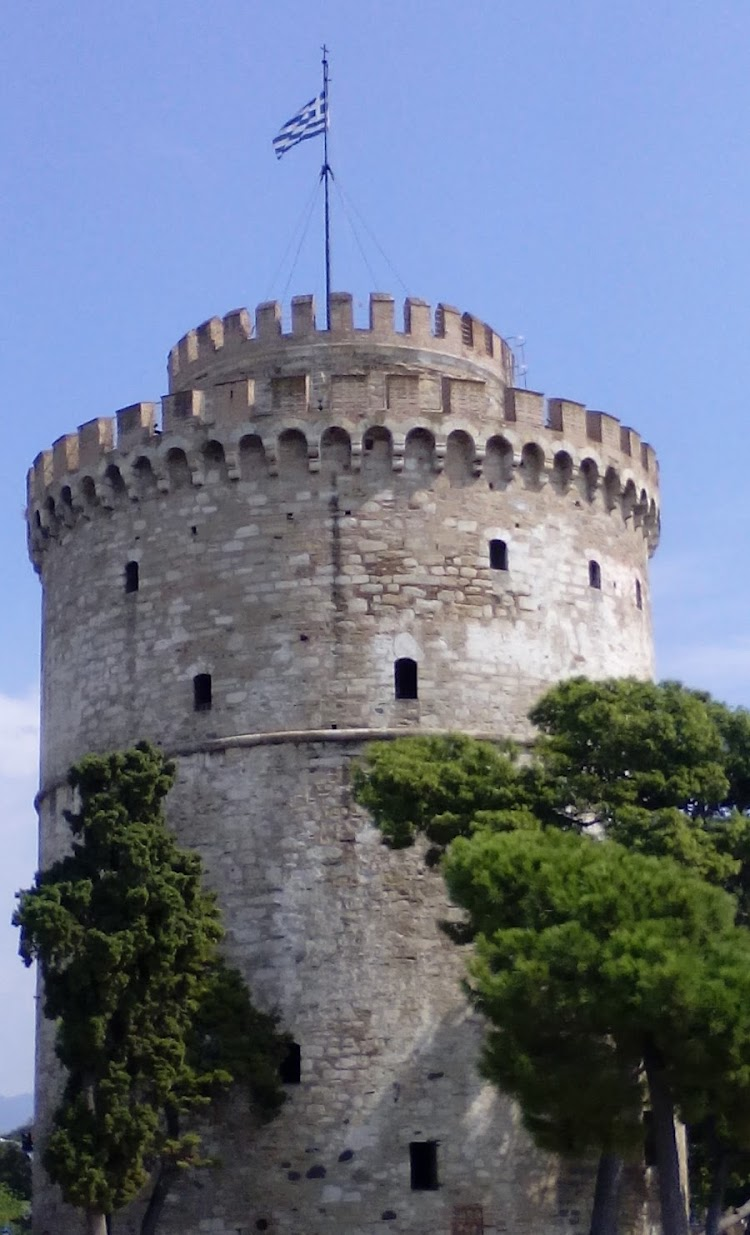
White Tower of Thessaloniki

== See also ==
- Ottoman architecture
- Ottoman Greece
- Byzantine architecture
- Byzantine Greece
