= Chemise (wall) =

Inner wall of a castle surrounding the keep

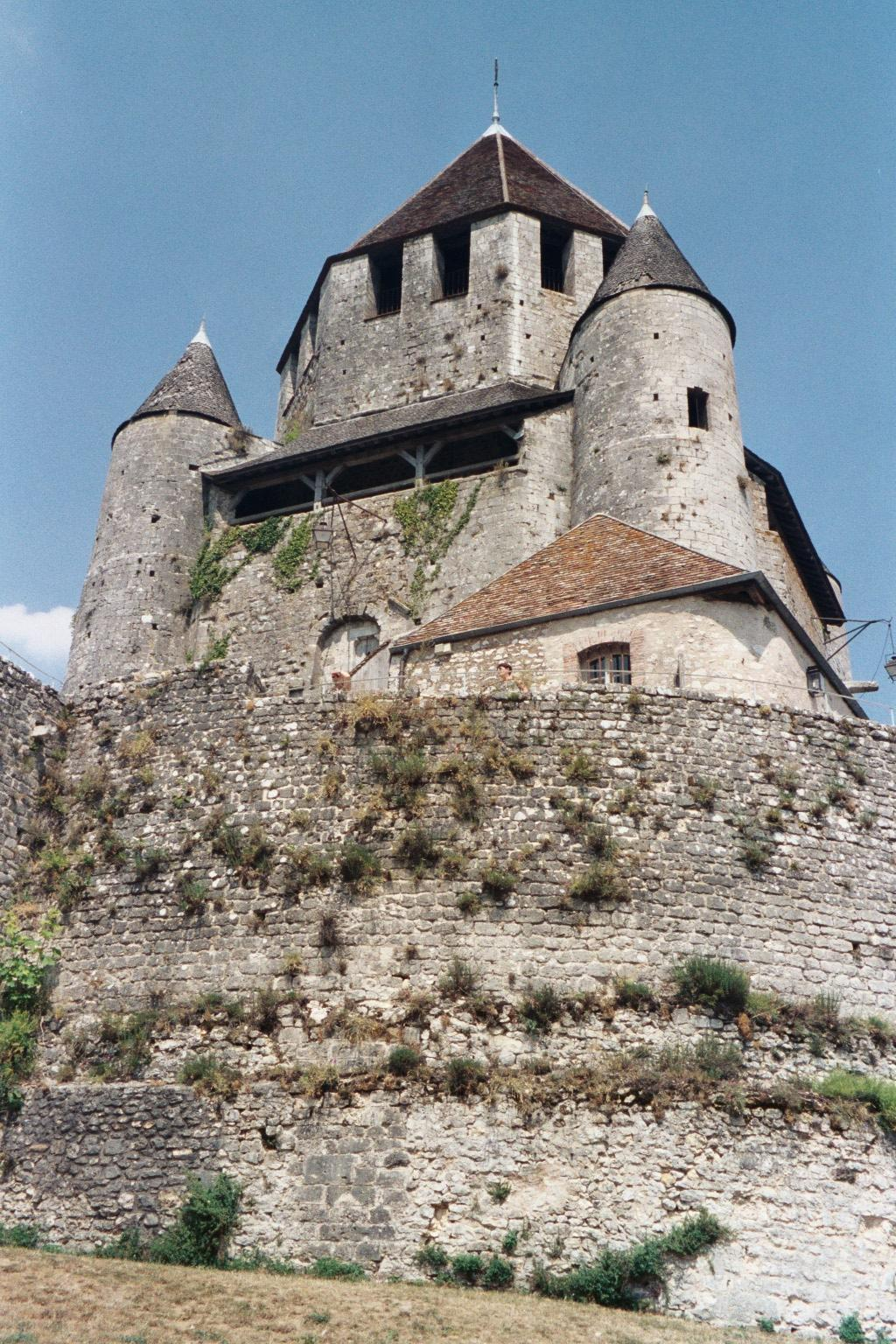
The keep at Provins encircled by a low wall

In medieval castles, the chemise (French: "shirt") was typically a low wall encircling the keep, protecting the base of the tower. Alternative terms, more commonly used in English, are mantlet wall or apron wall.

In some cases, the keep could be entered only from the chemise (i.e. at the first floor level). Numerous examples exist of highly varied form, including the heavily fortified chemise of Château de Vincennes, or the more modest example at Provins, both in France. Some chemises are suggested to have been developed from earlier motte and bailey defences, though they may not usually be referred to as chemise.

In later fortification, a chemise is a wall lined with a bastion, or any other bulwark of earth, for greater support and strength.

== Bibliography ==
- Mesqui, Jean (1997). Chateaux-forts et fortifications en France. Paris: Flammarion. p. 493 pp. ISBN 2-08-012271-1.
