= Solon Stylien J. Vlasto =

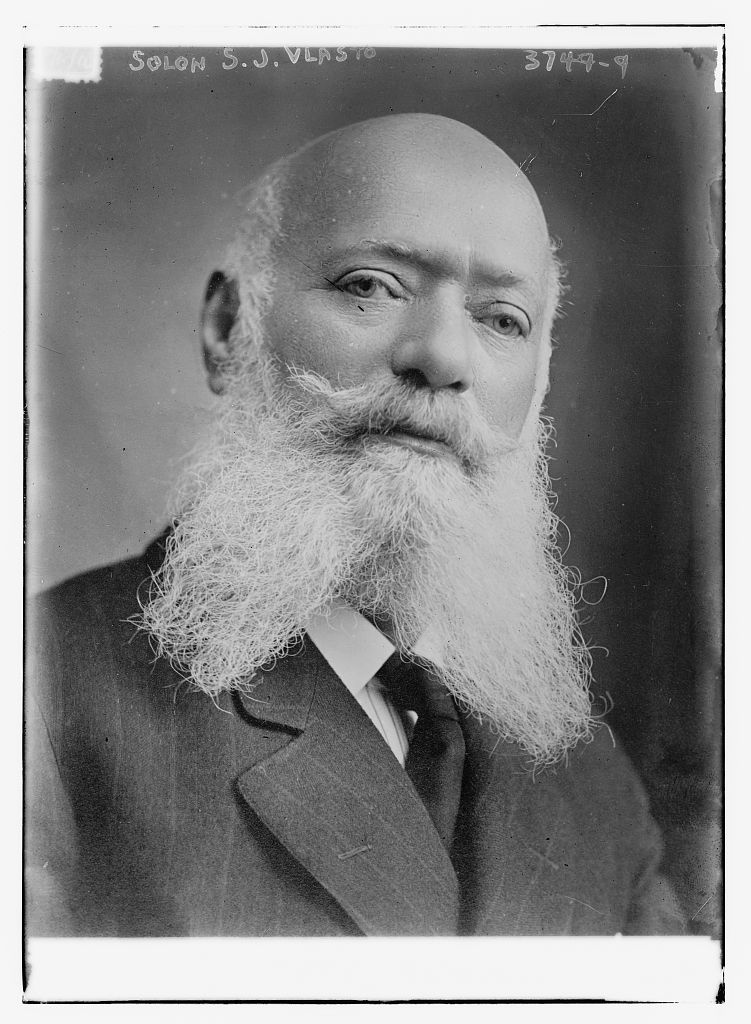
Solon Stylien J. Vlasto circa 1915

Solon Stylien J. Vlasto (September 1852 – 1927) was the Greek-born American editor of a Greek paper in New York City, THR1`Atlantis.

He migrated to the United States in 1873 and sold lamp oil. In 1894 he started Atlantis. He married and had a son, Solon G. Vlasto, who was born in Athens.
