= Columbia University School of General Studies =

Undergraduate school of Columbia University in New York City

Coordinates: 40.809163°N 73.962941°W

School of General Studies
- Coat of arms
- Motto: Lux in Tenebris Lucet
- Motto in English: The light that shines in the darkness
- Type: Private
- Established: 1947
- Affiliations: Albert A. List College (Jewish Theological Seminary of America), Sciences Po, Trinity College Dublin, Tel Aviv University, and City University of Hong Kong
- Dean: Lisa Rosen-Metsch
- Students: 2,603 (Fall 2019)
- Location: 408 Lewisohn Hall, New York City, U.S.
- Campus: Morningside Heights Campus, urban, 36 acres (0.15 km^{2}; 0.056 sq mi)
- Website: gs.columbia.edu

The School of General Studies (GS) is a liberal arts college and one of the undergraduate colleges of Columbia University, situated on the university's main campus in Morningside Heights, New York City. GS is known primarily for its traditional B.A. program for non-traditional students (those who have had an academic break of at least one year or are pursuing dual degrees). GS students make up almost 30% of the Columbia undergraduate population.

GS offers dual-degree programs with several leading universities around the world. It offers dual degrees with List College of the Jewish Theological Seminary, Sciences Po in France, Trinity College Dublin in Ireland, Tel Aviv University in Israel, and City University of Hong Kong. It also offers the BA/MA Option with the Graduate School of Arts and Sciences, the Combined Plan and the MS Express program with the School of Engineering and Applied Sciences, and five-year joint degrees with the School of International and Public Affairs. GS offers the Postbaccalaureate Premedical Program, the oldest and largest program of its kind in the United States.

Notable alumni include Nobel Prize winners Simon Kuznets, Baruj Benacerraf, and Louise Glück, as well as J.D. Salinger, Amelia Earhart, Leonard Cohen, Pat Boone and Princess Firyal of Jordan.

== History ==
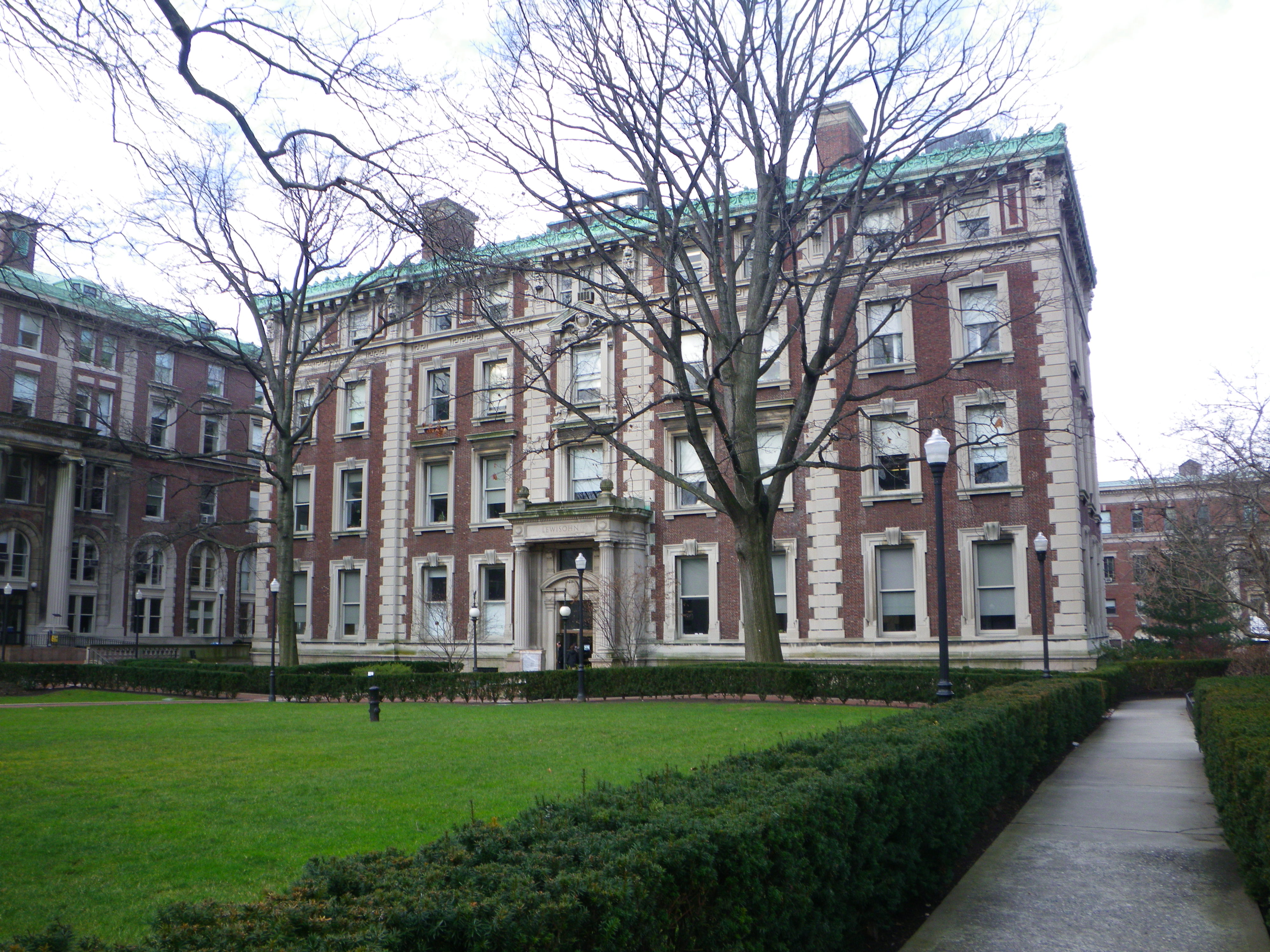
Lewisohn Hall at Columbia University, home to the School of General Studies.

=== Predecessor institutions ===
GS's evolutionary ancestor is the now-defunct, all-male Seth Low Junior College, named for former Brooklyn mayor and President of Columbia Seth Low. It was established in Downtown Brooklyn in 1928 to help alleviate the flood of Jewish applicants to Columbia College. The entrance requirements for Seth Low Junior College were reportedly the same as those enforced in Columbia College. Following completion of the two-year program, graduates could complete their undergraduate degrees at the university's professional schools, such as the School of Law, Business School, or School of Engineering and Applied Science (all of which conferred terminal bachelor's degrees at the time) or earn B.S. degrees in the liberal arts as University Undergraduates.

Seth Low Junior College was closed in 1936 due to the adverse economic effects of the Great Depression and concomitant popularity of the tuition-free Brooklyn College, which opened in 1930. Henceforth, its remaining students were absorbed into the Morningside Heights campus as students in the University Undergraduate program, which was established by Nicholas Murray Butler in 1904.

University Extension was responsible for the founding of the Columbia Business School, the School of General Studies and the School of Dental and Oral Surgery (now the College of Dental Medicine). The School of Continuing Education (now the School of Professional Studies), a separate school, was later established to reprise University Extension's former role.

=== The Establishment of the School of General Studies ===
With an influx of students attending the university on the GI Bill following the resolution of World War II, in December 1946, the University Undergraduate program was reorganized as an official undergraduate college for "qualified students who, because of employment or for other reasons, are unable to attend other schools of the University." Columbia University pioneered the use of the term "General Studies" when naming the college, adapting the medieval term for universities, "Studium Generale." Thus, the School of General Studies bears no semblance to general studies or extension studies programs at other universities in the United States. In December 1968, the University Council permitted GS to grant the B.A. degree instead of the B.S. degree (over the objections of some members of the Columbia College Faculty).

=== Merging of Columbia College and School of General Studies Faculties ===
In 1991, the Columbia College (CC), School of General Studies (GS), and Graduate School of Arts and Sciences (GSAS) faculties were merged into the Faculty of Arts & Sciences, which resulted in the complete academic integration between the School of General Studies and Columbia College. As a result, both GS and CC students receive B.A. degrees conferred by the Trustees of Columbia University through the Faculty of Art & Sciences, and GS is recognized as an official liberal arts college at Columbia University.

== Academics ==
School bulletin, 1980.

GS students make up almost 30% of the Columbia undergraduate population and in 2013 were reported as consistently collectively earning the highest average GPA among undergraduates at Columbia University. Approximately 20% of GS students are part-time students who have significant, full-time work commitments in addition to their academic responsibilities. Numerous GS students have gone on to win prestigious fellowships, including the Rhodes Scholarship, the Gates Cambridge Scholarship, and the Fulbright Scholarship.

The School of General Studies confers the degree of Bachelor of Arts in more than 70 majors. All GS students are required to complete the Core Curriculum, which includes University Writing, Literature/Humanities, Contemporary Civilization/Social Science, Art Humanities, Music Humanities, Global Core, Quantitative Reasoning, Science, and Foreign Language.

GS offers dual degree programs with Sciences Po, the City University of Hong Kong, Trinity College Dublin in Ireland, Tel Aviv University, and List College of the Jewish Theological Seminary. It also offers dual degree programs with the School of Engineering and Applied Sciences, the School of International and Public Affairs, and Columbia Business School. GS has a Post-baccalaureate Premedical Program, the oldest program of its kind.

== Admission ==
Admission to Columbia GS requires an online application, official high school (or GED) transcripts, an essay of 1,500-2,000 words, and two recommendation letters. Interviews are conducted in person and over phone.

== Dual degree programs ==
=== Joint Program with the Jewish Theological Seminary – Albert A. List College ===
Since 1954, the Jewish Theological Seminary of America (JTS) and the School of General Studies have offered a joint degree program leading to a B.A. from Columbia University and a B.A. from List College. Professor Lisa Rosen-Metsch, Dean of the School of General Studies, is an alumna of the Joint Program.

=== Dual BA with Sciences Po Paris ===
The Dual BA Program is a unique program in which undergraduate students earn two Bachelor of Arts degrees in four years from both Columbia University and Sciences Po, one of the most prestigious universities in France and Europe. This program is geared towards traditionally-aged applicants in high school, and is one of the most selective undergraduate programs in the nation.

Students spend two years at one of four Sciences Po campuses in France (Le Havre, Menton, Poitiers, or Reims), each of which is devoted to a particular region of the world. At Sciences Po, undergraduates can pursue majors in political science, economics, law, finance, history, among others. After two years at Sciences Po, students matriculate at Columbia University, where they complete the Core Curriculum and one of over 70 majors offered at Columbia. Graduates of the program are guaranteed admission to a Sciences Po graduate program.

=== Joint Bachelor's Degree with City University of Hong Kong ===
This program is open to top-ranked undergraduates enrolled at the City University of Hong Kong and allows graduates to receive two bachelor's degrees from the City University and Columbia in four years. Undergraduates spend their first two years at the City University and their final two years at Columbia, where they complete the Core Curriculum and choose one of 70 majors offered at Columbia.

=== Dual BA Program with Trinity College Dublin ===
The Dual bachelor's degree Program with Trinity College Dublin is a unique program in which undergraduate students earn two Bachelor of Arts degrees in four years from both Columbia University and Trinity College Dublin. Trinity College Dublin is the oldest university in Ireland and is widely considered to be its most prestigious institution. This program is geared towards traditionally-aged applicants in high school.

=== Tel Aviv University and Columbia University Dual Degree Program ===
The Tel Aviv Columbia Dual Degree Program allows undergraduates to earn two bachelor's degrees over the course of four years. Students spend the first two years of their undergraduate careers at Tel Aviv and then spend their final two years at Columbia while completing the Core Curriculum and major. Tel Aviv University is considered to be one of Israel's leading and most prestigious institutions. This program is geared towards traditionally-aged applicants in high school.

=== Combined Plan with the School of Engineering and Applied Science ===
GS students are eligible for competitive admission to the School of Engineering and Applied Science (SEAS) through the Columbia Combined Plan program, under the condition that they complete the necessary pre-engineering courses with a high GPA and obtain recommendations from 3 instructors. Students in the program receive a B.A. in a liberal arts discipline from GS and a B.S. in an engineering discipline from SEAS. Students may apply for the Combined Plan program in their junior (3-2 program) or senior (4–2) year of undergraduate study.

== Notable alumni ==
An asterisk (*) indicates a former student who did not graduate.

=== Academia ===
- Herbert Aptheker (1933), American Marxist historian and political activist
- Simon Kuznets (1923), Nobel Prize-winning economist.
- Alex B. Novikoff (1931), professor of Albert Einstein College of Medicine, recipient of the E.B. Wilson Medal
- Emil L. Smith (1931), American biochemist, professor at University of California, Los Angeles
- Isaac Asimov (1939), science fiction writer and biochemist, professor of biochemistry
- Baruj Benacerraf (1942), Nobel Prize-winning immunologist.
- Eric McKitrick (1949), professor at Columbia University, winner of the 1994 Bancroft Prize
- Allen Forte (1950), professor at Yale University, music theorist and musicologist
- Karl Katz (1952), art historian, former director of the Israel Museum and the Jewish Museum in New York City
- Irma B. Jaffe (1958), art historian, writer, research curator and academic
- Alfred Appel (1959), scholar on Vladimir Nabokov.
- Jehuda Reinharz (1964), President of Brandeis University
- Edward Cecil Harris (1971), Creator of the Harris matrix
- Roger Pilon (1971), Constitutional scholar and legal theorist.
- George M. von Furstenberg (1963), professor at Indiana University Bloomington
- Gershon Hundert (1968), Canadian historian of Jewish history at McGill University
- Barbara Ransby (1984), professor at the University of Illinois at Chicago and president of the National Women's Studies Association
- Keren Yarhi-Milo (2003), Dean of School of International and Public Affairs, Columbia University and professor of political science

=== Politics ===
- Philippe Reines (2000), Deputy Assistant Secretary of State for Public Affairs and Senior Advisor to Secretary of State Hillary Rodham Clinton.
- Patrick Gaspard* (1994–1997), United States Ambassador to South Africa (2013–2016), White House Political Affairs Director for U.S. President Barack Obama, former executive director of the Democratic National Committee.
- Mike Gravel (1956), Former United States Senator from Alaska and candidate for the 2008 Democratic nomination for President of the United States. Released full Pentagon Papers.
- Howard Dean (1975), Former Governor of Vermont and Chairman of the Democratic National Committee.
- Peter H. Kostmayer (1971), United States Congressman from Pennsylvania.
- Seymour Halpern (1934), United States Congressman from New York
- Gale Brewer (1997), 27th Borough president of Manhattan
- Stewart Rawlings Mott (1959), American lobbyist and philanthropist, son of General Motors co-founder Charles Stewart Mott
- Patricia Robinson (1955), First Lady of Trinidad and Tobago from 1997 to 2003
- Perezi Kamunanwire (1969), former ambassador of the Republic of Uganda to the United States and Germany; permanent representative at the United Nations
- John Paton Davies Jr. (1931), American diplomat, Medal of Freedom recipient, and one of the recognized China Hands who took part in the Dixie Mission.
- Zoltan Istvan (1998), American transhumanist who ran for President of the United States in 2016
- Ethan Gutmann (1986), China watcher and human rights advocate

=== Literature and arts ===
- Ashley Bryan (1950), writer and illustrator of children's books and recipient of the Children's Literature Legacy Award in 2009
- Ina Caro (1962), American travel writer, wife of Robert Caro
- J. D. Salinger* (1939), Writer, The Catcher in the Rye. Salinger is also a WWII combat veteran, having served in the U.S. Army's 12th Infantry Regiment. He stormed Utah Beach on D-Day during the Normandy landings.
- Federico García Lorca* (1929), Spanish poet and dramatist; influential member of the Generation of '27
- Barbara Probst Solomon (1960), American author, essayist and journalist
- Louis Simpson (1948), Pulitzer Prize-winning American poet
- Ingrid Bengis (1996), American writer
- Sasha Frere-Jones (1993), American writer, music critic, and musician
- Alicia Graf Mack (2000s), American dancer
- Ted Rall (1991), Syndicated cartoonist, president of the Association of American Editorial Cartoonists from 2008 to 2009
- Simi Linton (1977), author, consultant, public speaker who focuses on disability studies
- Menachem Kaiser (2009), author, winner of the 2022 Sami Rohr Prize for Jewish Literature
- Edward Klein (1960), Author.
- Kevin Brown* (1990), biographer, essayist, translator
- Joy Leftow (1983), poet, fiction writer, essayist
- Mykola Dementiuk (1984), American author; twice winner of the Lambda Literary Award
- Lee Siegel (1980s), cultural critic
- Cecil Brown (1966), African American writer and educator
- John Rousmaniere (1967), American sailor, author on sailing and yachting history
- Castle Freeman, Jr. (1968), author, Go with Me; contributor to Old Farmer's Almanac
- Hunter S. Thompson*, (1959). Writer, founder of the Gonzo journalism movement
- Herbert Kuhner (1959), Austrian writer and translator
- Donald Clarence Judd (1953), Artist.
- Dolores Dembus Bittleman (1952), American fiber artist
- Louise Glück (attended), poet, recipient of the 2020 Nobel Prize in Literature, former United States Poet Laureate
- Alexandra Ansanelli (2010-), American ballet dancer for The Royal Ballet
- Arlene Shuler (1977), President and CEO of the New York City Center
- Heidi Vanderbilt (1948–2021), stage actress, writer, and photographer
- Daniel Magariel (2008), American novelist

=== Technology and entrepreneurship ===
- Thomas Reardon (2008), creator of Internet Explorer
- John W. Backus (1949), Developer of Fortran, the first true computer language, winner of the 1977 Turing Award
- Scott Brinker (2005), programmer and entrepreneur, VP of HubSpot
- Chris Dixon (1996), angel investor, partner of venture capital firm Andreessen Horowitz, co-founder of Hunch and SiteAdvisor
- Lovens Gjed (2019), Founder of MEnvesti.com
- Arthur Kantrowitz (1934), American engineer, professor at Dartmouth College
- N. Robert Hammer (1965), former chairman, President, and CEO of Commvault

=== Activism ===
- Jane Jacobs* (1940s), author The Death and Life of Great American Cities, urban theorist and activist.
- Florynce Kennedy (1949), Feminist, Civil Rights advocate, Social activist
- Susan Mesinai (1965), activist, founder of the Ark Project that aimed to find out information on non-Russians taken prisoner by the former Soviet Union
- Matthew Lipman (1948), founder of the Philosophy for Children movement
- Irwin Kula (1978), co-president of CLAL, National Jewish Center for Learning and Leadership.
- Cameron Kasky (2023), student activist who founded Never Again MSD and organizer of March for Our Lives

=== Music ===
- Ira Gershwin* (1918), Pulitzer Prize-winning American composer.
- Heather D'Angelo (2012), member of the pop band Au Revoir Simone.
- Leonard Cohen* (1957), Musician and poet
- Jason Everman (2013), former member of Nirvana, Soundgarden, other side projects. Everman also served in the U.S. Army as both a Ranger and Green Beret. He completed tours in Iraq and Afghanistan.
- Yonatan Gat (2014), Musician, producer, founder of Monotonix and solo artist
- Gil Shaham (1990), Violinist.
- Lena Park (2010), Korean-American singer
- Robin Pecknold (2016), American musician and frontman of Seattle indie folk band Fleet Foxes
- Pat Boone (1957), Singer and actor.
- Tamar Kaprelian (2016), Singer.
- Ben Platt* (2016), Broadway actor and singer, Pitch Perfect, The Book of Mormon, Dear Evan Hansen, transferred from Columbia College
- Lipa Schmeltzer* (2018), singer, "the Lady Gaga of Hasidic music"

=== Film and entertainment ===
- Joseph Gordon-Levitt* (2000–2004), American actor and director
- Robert Sean Leonard*, American actor
- Jonathan Taylor Thomas (2010), Actor
- Kristi Zea (1974), American production designer, costume designer, art director, and director
- David O. Selznick* (1923), Hollywood producer, King Kong, Gone with the Wind
- Telly Savalas (1946), Actor, Emmy Award winner and Oscar nominee.
- Sarah Ramos (2013-), American actress, American Dreams, Parenthood
- Michelle Rejwan (2008), Senior vice president of Lucasfilm, producer of Star Wars: The Rise of Skywalker
- Eric Shaw (2003), Emmy Award-winning writer for SpongeBob SquarePants
- Ossie Davis (1948), Actor and social activist, Emmy- and Golden Globe-award nominee
- Eric Drath (1994), Sports Emmy Award-winning director and producer
- Julia Bacha (2003), Brazilian documentary maker, director of Budrus
- Larysa Kondracki (2001), Canadian film director, The Whistleblower
- Donald Richie (1953), Film Critic
- Anthony Perkins* (1954), Actor and writer known for his portrayal of Norman Bates in Alfred Hitchcock's Psycho
- Frank Sutton (1952), actor, Gomer Pyle, U.S.M.C.
- Famke Janssen* (1990s), Dutch actress, GoldenEye, the X-Men series, Hemlock Grove and How to Get Away with Murder
- Taylor Black (2014), American actress, All My Children, winner of Miss New York Teen USA in 2009
- Elegance Bratton (2014), filmmaker and photographer
- Chloe Bridges (2020), actress, Freddie, Camp Rock 2: The Final Jam
- Yeonmi Park (2020), North Korean defector and human rights activist
- Morgan Saylor (2023), actress, Homeland
- Madison Hu (2024), actress, Bizaardvark

=== Media ===
- R. W. Apple (1961), The New York Times associate editor.
- James S. Vlasto (1950s), American editor, public relations consultant for Franklin Delano Roosevelt Jr. and Herman Badillo; press secretary for Governor of New York Hugh Carey; father of Chris Vlasto, executive producer of Good Morning America
- Jacques Pepin (1970), internationally recognized French chef, TV personality, dean at the International Culinary Center
- Mary Helen Bowers (2008), celebrity fitness guru, entrepreneur, former New York City Ballet dancer
- Ray William Johnson* (2008), YouTube celebrity best known for his show "Equals Three"
- Trish Regan (2000), Fox Business Network anchor
- Steve Hofstetter (2002), comedian, host, and executive producer of "Laughs" on Fox television stations
- Erik Courtney (2000) Bravo TV personality Newlyweds: The First Year
- Mark Rotella (1992), senior editor at Publishers Weekly
- John Horgan (1982), American science journalist, known for his 1996 book, The End of Science
- Howard G. Chua-Eoan (1983), News Director, Time
- Jamal Dajani (1988), Palestinian-American journalist, Peabody Award winner, and former aide to Prime Minister of the Palestinian National Authority Rami Hamdallah
- Eytan Schwartz (2001), Israeli Reality television personality
- Mitch Swenson (2014), American freelance reporter and designer of video game 1000 Days of Syria

=== Athletics ===
- Red Auerbach* (1937–39), legendary basketball coach of the Washington Capitols, Tri-Cities Blackhawks, and general manager of the Boston Celtics
- Kimberly Navarro (2004), ice dancer, 2008 & 2009 U.S. bronze medalist and 2008 Four Continents bronze medalist.
- Trent Dimas (2002), Olympic champion gymnast
- Gillian Wachsman (1994), former skater; 1985 NHK Trophy champion and 1986 U.S. national champion
- Sandy Koufax* (1955), Hall of Fame pitcher for the Brooklyn and Los Angeles Dodgers
- Courtney King-Dye (2004), Olympic equestrian
- Troy Murphy (2015), former NBA player
- Sasha Cohen (2016), Olympic Silver medalist in figure skating
- Reed Kessler (2018 - attending), Olympic show jumping competitor
- Silvia Hugec (2023), figure skater and Slovak national champion

=== Fashion ===
- Gerard W. Ford (1957), Founder of the Ford Modeling Agency.
- Mary McFadden (1959), Fashion Designer
- Rachel Williams (1994), American model, landscape designer, daughter of architect Tod Williams and sister of filmmaker Tod Williams
- Kelly Killoren Bensimon (1998), model, author, socialite, The Real Housewives of New York City
- Sara Ziff (2011), American supermodel, president and founder of Model Alliance
- Cameron Russell (2013), model and activist, daughter of Zipcar founder Robin Chase
- Abby Stein (2014 - attending), model and activist, direct descendant of the Hasidic Savran dynasty
- Alexandra Waterbury (2021), ballet dancer and fashion model

=== Miscellaneous ===
- Amelia Earhart* (1920), American aviator and early female pilot
- Steve Brozak (1982), investment banker, retired marine
- Jim Dunnigan (1970), author, military-political analyst, wargame designer
- Princess Firyal of Jordan (1999) Jordanian princess, socialite, and philanthropist
- Yitzhak Aharon Korff (1969), Rebbe of the Mezhbizh and Zvhil dynasties, and ex-husband of ViacomCBS heiress Shari Redstone
- Menachem Mendel Schneerson (1962), Rebbe of the Chabad-Lubavitch Dynasty
- John Tauranac (1963), Chief designer of the New York City Subway map of 1979
- Josh Waitzkin* (1999), Child chess prodigy and author, whose life inspired the movie Searching for Bobby Fischer
- Gabby Gabreski (1949), American flying ace during World War II and the Korean War; headed the Long Island Rail Road
- Farahnaz Pahlavi (1986), eldest daughter of Mohammad Reza Pahlavi, last Shah of Iran
