= Vlasto =

Vlasto is a surname. Notable people with the surname include:

- Chris Vlasto (born 1966), American television producer
- Dominique Vlasto (born 1946), French politician
- James S. Vlasto (1934–2017), Press Secretary to Governor Hugh L. Carey of New York
- George S. Vlasto (1928–2014) Assistant Professor of Physiology and Neurobiology at University of Connecticut
- Alexis P. Vlasto (1915–2000) Slavonic scholar at Cambridge University
- Julie Vlasto (1903–1985), French tennis player
- Solon Stylien J. Vlasto (1852–1927) Founder of the Atlantis newspaper

== See also ==
- Vlastos
