= Boris Yuzhin =

American spy against the Soviet Union

Boris Nikolaevich Yuzhin (Russian: Борис Николаевич Южин; born February 21, 1942) is a former Soviet spy. He was a mole in the KGB, spying for the Federal Bureau of Investigation in the 1970s and 1980s before being caught and imprisoned. Arriving in San Francisco in 1975, he, as an expert in semiconductors, posed as a visiting scientist at UC Berkeley where he attempted to find any useful information or possible contacts. During his second assignment to the United States, Yuzhin was assigned by the KGB to monitor student activities under the cover of a TASS correspondent.

In 1978, Yuzhin began working for the FBI. He revealed the existence of the KGB's Group North (Russian: группа "Север"), which was an "elite unit of senior Soviet intelligence officers who specialized in recruiting American and Canadian targets worldwide. (Note: A group "North" unit usually consisted of one or two officers of the PR (political intelligence) and KR (foreign counterintelligence) lines, as well as one from the X line (scientific and technical intelligence). Occasionally, officers from group "North" would visit a residency to liaison with the work of the "main enemy groups". Group "North" was in the First Division of the PGU and was headed by Vadim Kirpichenko (Russian: Вадим Кирпиченко), who was the former KGB rezident for Tunisia and Egypt in Cairo (1970-1974) that allegedly recruited Nasser's intelligence chief Sami Sharaf.) Yuzhin would take pictures of sensitive documents using a tiny CIA camera disguised as a cigarette lighter. His information led to the arrest of Arne Treholt, a Norwegian diplomat who was spying for the Soviets.

Yuzhin worked at the Soviet Consulate General in San Francisco, California, where he revealed that Harry Bridges was a KGB agent and that Bridges told the KGB in 1980 that Ronald Reagan would be more predictable and that the KGB should support Reagan during the 1980 election rather than Carter whom the KGB abhorred. The KGB discovered that Yuzhin was a mole in 1985, first when CIA officer Aldrich Ames identified him (as well as Valery Martinov and Sergei Motorin, KGB officers based in the Soviet embassy in Washington), and later when FBI mole Robert Hanssen confirmed that the three were working for U.S. intelligence a few months later, in his first letter to his Soviet handlers on October 1, 1985. (Note: A Russian source in 2009 stated that twelve agents were arrested by Alpha Group during 1985 to 1986. David Wise stated that 36 agents were lost because of Ames.)

Martinov and Motorin, who were more junior KGB officers, were recalled to Moscow and executed. Yuzhin had returned to Moscow for reassignment in 1982 and was arrested in 1986 by an Alpha Group led by KGB Colonel Vladimir Nikolaevich Zaitsev who had previously been in the 7th Directorate of the KGB (Covert Surveillance). Yuzhin spent six years of a 15-year sentence in Perm 35 (ITK VS-389/35), a Siberian prison. According to one of Yuzhin's former FBI handlers, Yuzhin escaped execution because he was "never in residency in the KGB offices" and was able to "convince his interrogators he knew nothing about operations and cases." He was released on February 7, 1992 after the dissolution of the Soviet Union, when President Boris Yeltsin issued a general amnesty for political prisoners. Yuzhin immigrated to the United States, where the FBI helped him resettle in the San Francisco Bay area.

Ames was captured on February 21, 1994—Yuzhin's birthday. The day before Hanssen's arrest on February 18, 2001, Yuzhin received "a cryptic call" from an FBI contact telling him to "watch the news tomorrow." Described as "mild-mannered", Yuzhin currently lives in Santa Rosa in Northern California and is supported by a "modest government stipend." He lives with his wife Nadia and grown daughter Olga, an occupational therapist. Friends of Yuzhin's, including some longtime FBI agents who worked with him, said he lived in an attractive house he bought about five years ago in Santa Rosa, California with the money from the CIA. According to reports his "mother, sister and a married son, an economist, with children of his own, live in Russia ... Yuzhin has not been back to Russia since his release from prison in 1992, but his son and grandchildren come for visits." He "does historical research and augments his income with occasional lectures", including one lecture in October 2000 to the Southern California Fraud Investigation Association in Palm Springs, California, where Yuzhin spoke on "the Russian Mind".

Yuzhin has also worked with Susan Mesinai and the Ark Project on researching the cases of other former Soviet political prisoners, including Raoul Wallenberg and NSA cryptanalyst Victor Norris Hamilton, who defected to the Soviet Union in 1963 and was discovered in a Russian psychiatric hospital in 1992.
