= Atlantis (newspaper) =

Greek-language newspaper published in the United States

- The front page of Atlantis; Tuesday, November 14th, 1972
- Type: Daily newspaper
- Owner: The Atlantis Corporation
- Publisher: The Atlantis Corporation in 1904. In 1911, Atlantis Publishing Company published the Monthly Illustrated Atlantis.In 1921, the subsidiary Atlantis Greek Book Company was created.
- Founded: 1894
- Ceased publication: 1973
- Political alignment: Royalist
- Headquarters: West Forty-First Street, Manhattan, New York (1946 to 1953); 521 West 23rd Street, Manhattan, New York (1953–1973)
- Circulation: Peak circulation 35,000 (1917–1938)

The Atlantis was the first successful Greek language daily newspaper published in the United States. The newspaper was founded in 1894 by Solon J. and Demetrius J. Vlasto, descendants of the Greek noble family, Vlasto. The paper was headed by a member of the Vlasto family until it closed in 1973. Published in New York City, it had a national circulation and influence. Atlantis supported the royalist faction in Greek politics until the mid-1960s. Atlantis editorial themes included naturalization, war relief, Greek-American business interests, and Greek religious unity.

== History ==
The history of the Greek-language newspaper Atlantis is closely related to the careers of the Vlasto family in the United States. Like many other Greek-Americans, the Vlasto family retained close ties to Greece. The newspaper throughout its history was headed by a Greek-born and Greek-educated member of the family.

=== Founders ===
Solon J. Vlasto (1895)

Demetrius J. Vlasto (1895)

Founders of the Atlantis from the George S. Vlasto Collection

Founder Solon Stylien J. Vlasto (1852–1927) immigrated to the United States in 1873. He eventually formed an import-export partnership with his brother Demetrius J. Vlasto (1869–1944).

The Vlasto brothers were active in New York City's Greek-American community. In 1891, Solon founded the Greek Society of Athena and served as president from 1891 to 1895. Its 1,000 or so members dedicated themselves to helping Greek newcomers adapt to life in the United States. In 1892, the society established the first Greek Orthodox Church, The Holy Trinity, in New York City.

In 1893, Solon J. wrote to the mayor of New York City, Thomas Francis Gilroy asking him to have the national flag of Greece displayed over City Hall in celebration of Greek Independence Day; On April 6, 300 Greeks marched through Broadway up to Chambers Street, an event that was a forerunner to New York's Greek Independence Day Parade thirty years later.

Solon J. received the honorary title of "exarch" from the Patriarch Joachim III of Constantinople. In 1916, King Constantine I of Greece also conferred the Gold Cross of Officer of the Order of the Redeemer, the Greek Legion of Honor for his "continual services to Greece and to the Greeks of America."

In 1894, the two brothers founded the newspaper Atlantis. Solon J. served as publisher until his death in 1927. Demetrius, the treasurer and secretary, succeeded him, and their nephew Solon G. Vlasto became publisher after Demetrius' death. In June 1960, Athenagoras I of Constantinople awarded Solon G. Vlasto the title of Grand Archon, Exarch General of the Great Church of Christ. Despite initial outside investment, all capital stock in Atlantis and its subsidiaries was within the family by 1921.

=== Editors-in-chief ===
The editor-in-chief of Atlantis was traditionally hired from outside the family. Socrates A. Xanthaky, editor from 1897, left in 1907 to found the rival newspaper Panhellinios. Adamantios Th. Polyzoides was editor from 1907 to 1933; Vladimir Constantinides, from 1933 to 1960. Solon G. Vlasto filled the post for several years. Panayiotis Gazouleas became editor in 1963 until 1972.

=== Early period ===
Originally, Solon J. Vlasto, wrote accounts of events and posted them outside his office door. From these notes came his weekly newspaper.

Atlantis increased steadily in circulation and had 3,400 readers by 1900.

The newspaper then appeared semi-weekly, later tri-weekly, until it finally became a daily in 1905.

In 1910, the Sunday edition and a magazine, the Monthly Illustrated Atlantis, began circulation. The magazine was published into the 1930s then reappeared again in 1953. Atlantis also operated a Greek-language book department, which issued a calendar, published several titles, and distributed many others.

The Atlantis Corporation was formed in 1904 and underwent reorganization twice. In 1911, Atlantis Publishing Company was organized to purchase the Monthly Illustrated Atlantis. In 1921, the subsidiary Atlantis Greek Book Company was created.

== Editorial opinion ==
Solon G. Vlasto, Publisher from 1944 to 1973 - George S. Vlasto Collection

Atlantis was widely recognized as a family paper. Solon J. Vlasto, previously a stringent critic of the Greek dynasty, in subsequent years became an ardent supporter of King Constantine and a leader of the royalist factions in Greek communities in the United States. Atlantis remained a royalist paper through the vicissitudes of war, elections, and coup, until King Constantine II's differences with the regime of the colonels during the mid-1960s.

Solon's brother and nephew shared the same views. Demetrius J. Vlasto was also actively involved in Atlantis, in war relief campaigns, and in church affairs. Solon G. Vlasto (nephew) came to the United States in 1918, when he was 15 years old to join Atlantis as a copy boy. In 1944, he became publisher and managing editor and in the early 1960s served briefly as editor. He was also active in war relief work and the church.

Several Vlasto family members of the third generation, Solon's son James S., and Barbara, and Andrew Vlasto, worked for Atlantis as well. James Vlasto was managing editor and spokesman for the family when the newspaper closed in 1973.

The newspaper's nationwide distribution helped it become an influential voice in the Greek-American community. It carried social and organizational notices, fiction, classified advertising, and advice columns. It also published news of Greek-American affairs, of trade and diplomatic relations between the two nations, and of Greek internal politics.

== Atlantis and Panhellenios (1908–1913) ==
Socrates A. Xanthaky, editor-in-chief of Atlantis from 1897, resigned from his post after a series of disputes with Vlasto. Seeking to dethrone his boss, Xanthaky gathered sufficient funds to start publication of Panhellenios [The Panhellenic] in 1908 as a tri-weekly. This newspaper also served as the mouthpiece of the Panhellenic Union, the first national organization seeking to coordinate Greek interests in America. Initially, the Panhellenic Union received the support of Vlasto, but his policy changed by late 1908.

Outstanding differences in polity and personality set the stage for a journalistic battle between Vlasto's Atlantis and Xanthaky's Panhellenios, representing the Panhellenic Union and Lambros Coromilas (Greek ambassador to the United States in 1908). Circulation increased for both papers as the readership characteristically chose sides. Vlasto won the struggle, though, as Coromilas departed from his American position in 1910, and as the Panhellenic Union's size and prestige suffered from reports of a financial scandal during the 1912-1913 Balkan Wars. Xanthaky, too, lost the contest against Vlasto as the Panhellenios stopped its presses in 1913.

No publication, however, approached Atlantis in influence at the time.

== Wartime relief efforts ==
While assisting the Greek-American in his adjustment to the new environment, Atlantis did not permit him to forget his poor homeland and its needs. Constant attention was therefore devoted, as in Athens, to the military posture of the nation. Greece had suffered a humiliating defeat in 1897 at the hands of the Ottoman Empire, with which it maintained tense relations. Added to this conflict was the contest with Serbia and particularly Bulgaria over Macedonian lands. In support of the Greek cause, editorials and feature articles publicized the development of volunteer military units in Greek centers throughout the United States.

From 1909 to 1911, Atlantis printed many articles on the travels and exploits of a famous fundraiser in the Greek colonies around the world, Spyros Matsoukas, who crossed the country to raise money for the purchase of the destroyer Nea Genea ("New Generation"), named in tribute to the reborn national spirit. Atlantis detailed the activities and rhymes of this self-proclaimed poet, who usually composed his verses at a prolific rate on trains en route to his next destination. As was done with all fundraising campaigns, the pages of Atlantis listed all contributors and the amounts given, down to the small sum of twenty-five cents.

The Atlantis also sponsored the collection of money for the Patriarchate in Constantinople and for the purchase of an airplane for the Greek army."

When the Italo-Turkish War erupted in October 1911, Atlantis printed special editions with extensive coverage of events.

In the fall of 1912, when the Balkan states appeared ready to declare war on the Ottoman Empire, the columns of Atlantis encouraged immigrants to return to Greece for the imminent hostilities. Headline articles publicized patriotic demonstrations of Greeks throughout America as they raised money or packed their bags to rush eastward towards waiting ships in New York harbor.

On October 9, 1912, Atlantis began printing a second daily edition for the New York area, and, with Greece's entry into the First Balkan War on October 17, the coverage of the distant events intensified.

To honor the victories of the Army's Commander-in-Chief, Crown Prince Constantine, who subsequently acceded the throne in March 1913, the Atlantis sponsored a fundraising program and collected $3000.49 for the purchase of a commemorative sword from Tiffany & Co. Demetrius J. Vlasto was one of the four who presented the sword on behalf of the Greeks of America to King Constantine, on Easter Day, 1913.

In 1913, after Greece's victory in the Second Balkan War against Bulgaria, Vlasto initiated a campaign to check the advances of pro-Bulgarian sentiment in the United States. Vlasto and his colleagues drafted a series of articles in English, published first in Atlantis, which countered Bulgarian activities and arranged to have over 500 newspapers across the nation (most of them small town weeklies) print these articles during the first months of 1914.

Vlasto also produced a succession of strong pieces against William Randolph Hearst's pro-Bulgarian editorials in the New York American. After several weeks of concentrated effort, Vlasto and other prominent Greeks persuaded Hearst to temper his pro-Bulgarian statements and to substitute it for comments favorable to the Greek position in Balkan politics.

Immigrant interest in the Balkan Wars pushed circulation of Atlantis to over 30,000 in 1914, a figure higher than any Athenian daily of the period.

== Voice for American citizenship and naturalization ==
As naturalization became more popular after the First World War, Atlantis became a strong voice in favor of American citizenship. Participation in the war effort had accelerated the Americanization process. Atlantis distributed handbooks and encouraged its readers to begin the naturalization process.

Vlasto tried to introduce immigrants to US politics and was a staunch supporter of Theodore Roosevelt. In 1911, perhaps as a result of Vlasto's influence, the majority of the 2,000 New York Greeks who had taken American citizenship supported the Republican Party and had even founded a Republican Political Club.

== Atlantis and The National Herald ==
Greek Americans, eager for news of their homeland in a language they could read, helped make the Atlantis the largest-circulation Greek newspaper in America. Its only serious competition was the Ethnikos Kyrix (The National Herald).

Having effectively dominated Greek-American journalism for almost two decades, Vlasto faced his strongest rival in 1915. Petros Tatanis, a successful merchant, accumulated $100,000 for the launching of The National Herald on April 2, 1915.

The two papers were radically different in their political views. The Atlantis supported the monarchy in Greece and the Republicans in America, criticizing the Democrats and Franklin D. Roosevelt's New Deal programs of the 1930s. The National Herald supported liberal causes in Greece and America and defended the New Deal.

As politics in Greece became steadily polarized, the two major opposition groups found themselves represented by journalists over five thousand miles away. In the resulting struggle which endured for many years, Atlantis generally defended conservative, pro-royalist positions, while The National Herald supported the liberal, progressive forces of Eleutherios Venizelos

== The Greek monarchy and Eleutherios Venizelos ==
Atlantis moved into national prominence about the time that the conflict (the so-called "National Schism") between Greek liberal leader Eleutherios Venizelos and King Constantine of Greece with his strong German ties reached its height.

Eleutherios Venizelos, Prime Minister since 1910 and head of the Liberal Party, advocated an alliance with the French and British on the premise that the nation would be amply rewarded with new territory for this support. King Constantine, who was German-educated and relied heavily on pro-German military advisers, warmly backed the objectives of the Megali Idea, but demanded certain guarantees in arms, troops, and money from the Allies to ensure national security. The dispute sharpened during 1915 with Venizelos maintaining that the King exceeded his constitutional prerogatives in blocking Greece's entrance into the war.

In 1916, Venizelos declared a separate Provisional Government in Thessaloniki to place pressure on the royalist regime in Athens to change its policies. Eventually, on June 13, 1917, the English and French forced the departure of King Constantine; later that same month, a triumphant Venizelos arrived in Athens, thus reuniting Greece with foreign assistance and bringing her into the war on the side of the Entente, his political benefactor.

Atlantis, by supporting the neutral stand of King Constantine, exposed itself to pro-German accusations. In backing Venizelos, The National Herald denounced its journalistic opponent for the endorsement of the monarch's policies. Both newspapers spurred the development of organizations to facilitate public expressions of support for their respective leaders. Rallies and proclamations increased from the autumn of 1916 and caught the attention of the American press, specifically The New York Times

Consistently condemned for alleged pro-German propaganda, Atlantis found itself investigated for possible violations of the Espionage Act of 1917. An investigation of its editorial policy and articles indicated that Atlantis did not violate the law. It might be pointed out that after Venizelos's return to power in June 1917, the sale of Atlantis in Greece was prohibited.

This decade before World War I also was during the peak of Greek migration to the United States. Many immigrants regarded their stay in the United States as temporary and remained strong partisans in Greek politics. The pages of Atlantis and its rivals reflected that partisanship so vigorously that the Vlastos became embroiled in libel actions based on Atlantis articles. Some suits resulted from their criticism of consular and diplomatic representatives of the Venizelos government.

After King Constantine's abdication in 1917, many Greek-American liberals regarded "Constantinism" as German propaganda, and attacked Atlantis' reporting on Greek internal affairs as damaging to the Allied war effort. These attacks brought the newspaper's mailing permit under close government scrutiny. The Vlasto's fought hard to meet U.S. Post Office regulations for foreign-language press mailings, and to modify them.

== Atlantis in the 1920s ==
During the 1920s, Atlantis is most noted for continuing themes the dramatic events of the previous war decade had overshadowed. After supporting relief efforts in the 1912 Balkan War and World War I, it performed this service again during the Greco-Turkish War (1919–1922).

Another domestic issue during the 1920s was a "civil war" within the ecclesiastical administration of the Greek Orthodox churches in the United States.

Royalist and Venizelist leaders concluded that the struggle posed a serious threat to the cultural identity of the Greek-American community so the Church of Greece, the Greek government, and the Patriarchate of Constantinople nominated Damaskinos as Patriarchal Exarch to the United States. Atlantis wrote a "conciliatory" article about his arrival.

== Atlantis during World War I ==
With America's entrance into World War I, both Vlasto and Panos Callimachos (editor of The National Herald), advocated wholehearted support of the American war effort, the purchase of Liberty Bonds, enlistment into the armed forces, and application by Greeks for American citizenship. Moreover, in the early spring of 1918 and in order to foster Greek unity behind the American cause, both newspapers agreed to drop the succession of libel suits against each other.

Immigrants became increasingly Americanized and the distant disputes held less of an attraction for them. Furthermore, with the immigration quota restrictions imposed by the Immigration Act of 1924, the former flood of newcomers from Greece became a mere trickle. The directors of Atlantis (Solon J. Vlasto died in 1927) acknowledged these changed circumstances, and their editorials became less heated.

Circulation figures for the period from World War I to World War II indicate significant fluctuations. In 1917, the Atlantis recorded 30,121 and by 1920, circulation climbed to 35,000. But from this high point, the demand began to decline and the Atlantis' circulation dipped very sharply.

== Atlantis in the 1930s ==
The Depression decade of the 1930s produced difficult times for Greeks as well as for most Americans. Atlantis, labeled an independent newspaper, consistently supported Republican interests and criticized Franklin D. Roosevelt's New Deal. Prior to the outbreak of the war, Atlantis softened its stance towards the President, acknowledging, as did other Greek-American editors with Republican inclinations, that the overwhelming majority of Greeks fell into the lower and small business classes and therefore backed New Deal measures.

Atlantis welcomed the restoration of the monarchy in the autumn of 1935 and the proclamation of a dictatorship by Ioannis Metaxas on August 4, 1936.

In 1937, Atlantis joined the Greek consul-general and the Orthodox Church to welcome a visiting spokesman for the Metaxas dictatorship as the representative of Greece's legitimate government. After the Italian invasion of Greece under Benito Mussolini in 1940, the Greek-American political debate was set aside in favor of massive war relief activity conducted through the Greek War Relief Association (GWRA). Atlantis solicited and forwarded contributions to GWRA.

For 1930, statistics show 12,429 readers for Atlantis.

== Atlantis from 1940 to 1973 ==
The Atlantis Building on Forty-First Street in New York City

During the war years and the postwar period, dominated by the second, American-born generation, Ahepa and other fraternal organizations, rather than the press, led the Greek-American community. Greek-Americans argued the legitimacy of the British-supported royalist government, and the merits of the left and the Greek Communist Party positions, throughout the 1940s. Atlantis continued to support the royalists.

In 1944, Solon G. Vlasto, (Solon J.'s and Demetrius J.'s nephew) became publisher of Atlantis until the newspaper ceased publication. The newspaper was later willed to him by his uncle.

The circulation of Greek-language papers increased during the 1950s. The war effort had renewed Hellenic pride. The Greek Orthodox Churches became more active in their communities. There was an influx of refugee immigrants and a movement to liberalize American immigration laws. Greek internal affairs, including the defeat of the Greek Communists in 1949, the United States' role in Cyprus, and the ascendancy of the Greek military regime, 1967-1974 also continued to be of interest to the Greek-American community and Greek-language press.

The daily Atlantis was published until October 1973 after 79 years of active publishing. In 1972, the dismissal of three Newspaper Guild members provoked a strike that suspended publication. For eight weeks, publication resumed in New Jersey, but picketing halted it again. In October 1973, unable to reach agreement with one of its five unions, and pressured for back rent, the Vlasto family decided to cease publishing.

B. J. Marketos, former publisher of The National Herald, lamented the fall of his longstanding rival in an editorial entitled To Symptoma (The Symptom). According to Marketos, the foreign-language press faces great dangers, as evidenced by the number of Italian, Polish, German, Hungarian, and Jewish dailies decreasing by 85% since 1945. Regrettably, newspapers such as Atlantis, which ministered to the needs of their people for so long, had to close. Yet this fate has also confronted English-language journals with circulations in the millions."

The Internal Revenue Service seized Atlantis's property for delinquent taxes and auctioned it on October 26, 1973. An unknown bidder bought back issues, presses, and other equipment. James S. Vlasto, speaking for the family, stated that the landlord's impatience and the union's intransigence had closed the paper. "I really don't think there was reason for it to die. The market was there and it could have survived."

The building on West Forty-First Street in New York City was purchased in 1946 and owned by the Atlantis until it was torn down to build the West Side Airlines Terminal by the Port Authority of New York and New Jersey. Offices later moved to 521 West 23rd Street.

== Notable people ==
=== George S. Vlasto ===
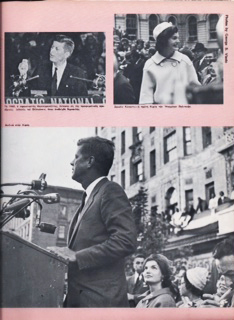
Photo of John F. Kennedy taken by George S. Vlasto, in New York City, two weeks before the election in November 1960 for the Monthly Illustrated Atlantis

George S. Vlasto, the eldest son of Solon G. Vlasto worked as a photo journalist while earning his degree at New York University. His photos were published in the editions of the Monthly Illustrated Atlantis. After earning his doctoral degree at New York University, he joined the University of Connecticut faculty at the Stamford campus as an assistant professor of Physiology and Neurobiology, teaching biology and pre-med. While working at the Atlantis, he covered many World War II victory celebrations, including ceremonies honoring Dwight D. Eisenhower, Chester W. Nimitz, and Winston Churchill. He also took photos of many major public figures including John F. Kennedy, Josip Broz Tito, Jawaharlal Nehru, Nikita Khrushchev and Fidel Castro. George S. Vlasto died at the age of 86 in August 2014.

=== James S. Vlasto ===
James S. Vlasto, the youngest son of Solon G. Vlasto joined the Atlantis in 1955 after two years service in the United States Army. He worked on the business side of the newspaper and later as a reporter and editor until he resigned in 1964 to join the campaign staff of United States Senator Kenneth B. Keating of New York. Mr. Vlasto served as traveling press officer for Senator Keating during his reelection campaign. Senator Keating lost the election to Robert F. Kennedy.

Mr. Vlasto later headed a political public relations firm in New York City until May 1976 when he was appointed Press Secretary to Governor Hugh L. Carey of New York. He later served as Press Secretary to New York City Public Schools Chancellor Joseph A. Fernandez.

He now serves as Project Director of the Homer L. Wise Memorial Committee that is raising funds to erect a bronze statue in Stamford, CT of Master Sergeant Homer L. Wise awarded the Medal of Honor on June 14, 1944; one of the most decorated infantrymen of World War II.

James S. Vlasto's oldest son is ABC News, Emmy Award winning, Executive Producer Chris Vlasto and his youngest son is former Communications Director for Governor Andrew Cuomo of New York, Joshua Vlasto.

=== Pete Hamill ===
In 1958, American journalist and novelist Pete Hamill worked as the art director of Atlantis after leaving the U.S. Navy and studying art on the GI Bill.

In the midst of laying out one edition, he suggested to editor James Vlasto that running a few stories in English might improve circulation, and the editor challenged him to try his own hand at writing one. Hamill chose to profile a promising Puerto Rican middleweight who trained under Cus D'Amato at the nearby Gramercy Gym. Hamill was paid $25 for what was his first published story, and the occasion boded well for both subject and author. By the time José Torres won the world light-heavyweight title seven years later, his lifelong friend Hamill had become the lead columnist for the New York Post.

Hamill wrote about his Atlantis experience in his best selling book, Drinking Life.

=== P.J. Gazouleas ===
P.J. Gazouleas was editor of the Atlantis from 1960 to 1972 and later editor of the Orthodox Observer a newspaper published by the Greek Orthodox Archdiocese of America. Gazouleas was an influential adviser to Archbishop Iakovos of America who led the Greek Orthodox Church in America for several decades.

== Notes ==
i: Translation from French pg.441 Livre D'or De La Noblesse Européenne "The only surviving branch of the family today is that of Chios, still active in commerce and who seek their fortunes in numerous countries. Some became bankers in Romania and other ship-owners in London or Marseilles. Others became businessmen in the USA: such as Solon Vlasto, founder of the Greek Fraternal Society in 1891 and of the first Greek Church in the USA, in New York in 1892.".
ii: "In contrast, the Panhellenic Union was an explicitly political organization whose aims were to help the immigrants become better citizens in the United States, and more importantly to rally them to the cause of Greek nationalism. The organization's ties with Greece meant that the Greek Consul was an influential figure. The Consul's role was resented by the leaders of the new immigrants, among them Solon J. Vlastos, and there was a great deal of tension between the Consul and immigrant leaders even though they were sympathetic with the Panhellenic Union's principles. Vlastos and others felt that the organization was overlooking the everyday needs of the New York Greeks."
iii: Spyros Matsoukas, a patriotic campaigner, came to America to raise money for a new Greek warship. Matsoukas often appeared in the uniform of a Greek Evzone, or highlander, a colorful figure in a white fustanella, or kilt, and a tasseled cap, whipping up the emotions of his audience with phrases such as 'Forward boys, our country needs money and bloode to become great!. Over $25,000 was raised for the new warship.
iv: An excerpt from an article in Atlantis published immediately following his arrival expresses this sentiment: "We are encouraged to believe that the dream of all Hellenism in America will come true and that it will see days of peace, love, and harmony in all respects. This longed-for guidance will be provided by Metropolitan Damaskinos, not only because he is the personal representative of the highest Greek Orthodox authorities, but because this is such a serious mission and he has been given wide powers to solve the entire problem."
v: As J. P. Xenides aptly commented in 1922,"Whatever bitter differences and quarrels newspapers may have among themselves they all defend the United States Government. They urge people to learn English and to respect and obey laws. They publish and explain all the news concerning the public welfare. The give also prominent space to all matter concerning the Liberty and Victory Loans, Red Cross, Y.M.C.A., Y.W.C.A., and other humanitarian organization. They preach Americanization."
vi: "The daily Atlantis is outspokenly royalist. Mr. Vladimir Constantinides, who is now Vice-President of the Atlantis Publishing Company and editor of its paper, has been and still is an ardent admirer of John Metaxas, whose portrait is prominently displayed in his office along with those of President Roosevelt and King George. He is quite evidently sincere in his belief that Metaxas was a truly great Greek. He is convinced that the Metaxas form of government—which he declares was not a dictatorship—probably "saved" Greece and he hopes that it will be reestablished after the war."
