= Susan Mesinai =

American poet, author and researcher (born 1942)

- Born: Susan Bromberg; September 25, 1942 (age 84); Detroit, Michigan, U.S.
- Education: Barnard College, Columbia University School of General Studies
- Occupations: Poet, author, researcher, activist
- Children: 2, including Raz Mesinai
- Father: Manuel Bromberg

Susan Mesinai (born 1942; née Susan Bromberg) is an American poet, author, researcher, and activist. She worked on researching the fates of foreign prisoners who disappeared into the Soviet Gulag during World War II and the Cold War. Co-founder of the Ark Project (1992–2005), she was founding president of the Independent Investigation into Raoul Wallenberg’s Fate, an educational human rights organization that furthers groundbreaking research carried out in the former Soviet Union, independently (1992–2003), and under the aegis of an official Swedish-Russian working group (1991–2001).

== Early life and education ==
Mesinai was born September 25, 1942, in Detroit, Michigan, to Manuel Bromberg, war artist for the European Theatre (1943–45) and Jane Dow Bromberg. Her father’s career as a painter, muralist, and professor of art and design placed her as a child in North Carolina, Europe, and Woodstock, New York, where she graduated salutatorian from Onteora Central School. During these years, she had personal contact with Buckminster Fuller, James Shotwell, Eleanor Roosevelt and Gore Vidal who each influenced her direction in life.

Mesinai entered Barnard College in 1960, intent upon a diplomatic career. However, her correspondence with Nobel Prize-winning author Hermann Hesse led instead to her study of myth, philosophy and comparative religion. A student of the theologian Reinhold Niebuhr and his wife Ursula, she graduated magna cum laude from the Columbia University School of General Studies in 1965. From 1983–1985, she studied philosophy at Jewish Theological Seminary, where she continued the project that led to the 1994 publication of Shlomo’s Stories. In 2004 Mesinai was designated, on an honor roll of 250 alumni spanning a 250-anniversary period, as Number 199 of Columbia University’s “greatest graduates.” Her selection was in response to her research into the Raoul Wallenberg case and her continued concern for the rights for the Disappeared.

== Career ==
Susan Mesinai is best known for her efforts to resolve the case of missing Swedish diplomat, Raoul Wallenberg. Wallenberg was revered for saving thousands of Jews from genocide in Nazi-occupied Hungary in the last half of 1944, and disappeared from Budapest on January 17, 1945. His status as a neutral and a diplomat as well as his humanitarian achievements fuel an ongoing international interest in determining his actual fate.

In 1981, as assistant to Dr. Irving Greenberg, then chairman of the U.S. President’s Commission on the Holocaust, Mesinai read a confidential eyewitness report that stated that Raoul Wallenberg remained alive in captivity, and posted a letter to him in the reported prison location. She would not become directly involved in the Wallenberg case until October 1989, after Soviet authorities returned Wallenberg's possessions to his next-of-kin, acknowledging their “tragic mistake,” but failing to present any evidence of his death. At this point, Mesinai states, she committed herself to the task of ascertaining Wallenberg's fate “beyond reasonable doubt.”

In 1991, Mesinai and Mikhail Kazachkov, a recently released Soviet prisoner, created the Ark Project, dedicated to enforcing “rule of law” in the case of foreign prisoners in the Gulag. Kazachkov and Mesinai initiated a trans-Russia appeal for information regarding missing American prisoners of war, both through publication in the human rights press and radio networking. Ark's discovery of Victor Hamilton, a former NSA cryptologist being held in a psychiatric prison hospital under another name in the Soviet Union, was world news. Because of this case and others in which she became involved, Mesinai was able to establish that anonymous foreign prisoners or dual nationals were still being held in asylums and psychiatric facilities throughout the former Soviet Union. Ark also worked with the families of American pilots lost in Cold War shoot-downs, leading to extensive media coverage through the NBC News Moscow Bureau, as well as a prize-winning article in U.S. News & World Report, in which Mesinai spoke of the Soviets' “policy of denial.” .”

In 1994, at the invitation of Wallenberg’s half-brother, Dr. Guy von Dardel, Mesinai became an ad hoc consultant to the official Swedish-Russian Working Group on Raoul Wallenberg’s Fate and instigated an archival research project to seek traces of Wallenberg in psychiatric facilities in Western Russia. As the majority of the earlier records had been removed to the East, she reverted to her comprehensive study of eyewitness reports, focusing also on other Swedes in the Gulag who could be mistaken for Wallenberg. In 1997, after assisting U.S. News & World Report with the reporting for a feature article, “The Angel Was A Spy,” Mesinai was employed by the Government of Sweden to do a full-time study of selected cellmates, indirect eyewitnesses and analogous cases, which might offer a paper trail that could lead back to Wallenberg.

Having gained unprecedented access to numbered prisoner files in 2000, Mesinai was able to place Wallenberg in a series of six missing numbered prisoners, should he have been convicted rather than executed in 1947. That Wallenberg was a numbered prisoner in 1947 was later substantiated by the Russians' admission that he was "most likely" Prisoner Number 7 interrogated one week after his alleged death date. In 2001, the Working Group, which had served under different Soviet/Russian leadership for a decade, was disbanded. On January 4, Mesinai addressed the question of Wallenberg’s returned possessions in an op-ed piece in Sweden’s prominent newspaper, Dagens Nyheter. She argued that according to prison regulations, a prisoner’s belongings taken at the point of arrest were either confiscated by the State or followed him throughout the Gulag until his repatriation or death. This raised the question of whether the invitation to Wallenberg’s next of kin in October 1989 was in fulfillment of the requirement that the possessions be returned within six months of a prisoner's death. That same week, Mesinai presented a report at an international press conference in Stockholm titled “Liquidatsia: The Question of Wallenberg’s Death or Disappearance in 1947”. Here, Mesinai again challenged the Soviet argument of an early death against the more prevalent practice of “disappearing” an important prisoner either by giving him a series of false identities, or a number.

Because of Russian insistence that all documents regarding Wallenberg's fate have been destroyed, Mesinai focuses on reconstructing Wallenberg’s paper trail through actual prison data as an alternative to a "smoking gun". In 2007, she joined her independent colleagues, Dr. Marvin Makinen of the University of Chicago, himself a former inmate of Vladimir Prison, and Ari Kaplan, prize-winning mathematician and statistician, to continue their combined studies initiated in Russia between 1997 and 2000. Building upon Makinen and Kaplan’s original report, Cell Occupancy Analysis of Korpus 2 of the Vladimir Prison, Mesinai focused on day-by-day movements of “unlisted” prisoners, without name or number. Together with Associate Aaron Slavik, who researches Soviet methods of concealment, Mesinai has added seven new findings that would verify previous eyewitness reports. Using the Russians' own registration system, she has further pinpointed one who remains "most likely" Raoul Wallenberg coming and going from Vladimir Prison over a 25-year period.

== Personal life ==
A former Board member of the Temple of Understanding, an international interfaith organization founded by Juliet Hollister, with Eleanor Roosevelt and Jawaharlal Nehru, Mesinai has worked in the not-for-profit sphere in welfare rights, indigenous rights, Holocaust and Jewish life, and environmental concerns.

Mesinai has two children: Maya Draisin Farrah, Associate Publisher, Marketing at Wired and arstechnica.com; and Raz Mesinai, composer, filmmaker and author. She currently resides in New York City.

== Publications ==
- "Shlomo's Stories," Rabbi Shlomo Carlebach with Susan Yael Mesinai, 1994. Aronson.
- "Welsh Woman Wandering & Other Poems," 2007, Codhill Press.
- "The Plight of the American POW in the Gulag," with Mikhail Khazhakov, Express Chronicle, Moscow. December 26, 1991, and January 9, 1992.
- "Oppna arkiven nu!" (In the Name of Raoul), Expressen MITT-i, January 28, 2000, page 25.
- "Beyond Reasonable Doubt," "Ryssarna doljer viktiga uppgifter," Dagens Nyheter, January 4, 2001.
- "Somebody's Swede," "Fler svenskar i Moskvas fanglager," Dagens Nyheter, July 5, 2002. Page A4.
- "Wheels Within Wheels: Dreams of Resurrection and Return" Parabola Magazine, Prison Issue. Summer 2003.
- "Thorny Truth," FOKUS.SE (Mesinai, Makinen, Berger, Kaplan), October 22, 2009.
- "Flamenco" And Then, v.17, 2013, p. 100.
