= Yuzhin =

Yuzhin (Russian: Южин) is a Russian masculine surname, its feminine counterpart is Yuzhina. It may refer to

- Alexander Yuzhin (1857–1927), stage name of Georgian Prince and Moscow theatre actor Sumbatov
- Boris Yuzhin (born 1942), Soviet spy
- Natalia Ermolenko-Yuzhina (1881–1937), Russian opera singer
