= Victor Hamilton =

Victor Hamilton may refer to:

- Victor Norris Hamilton (born 1919), American cryptologist
- Victor P. Hamilton (born 1941), Canadian / American theologian
