= Vlastos =

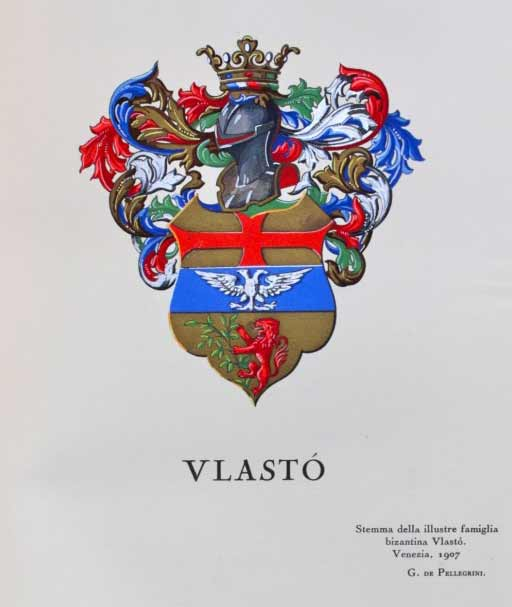
Coat of arms of the House of Vlasto

The Vlastos family, also spelled Vlasto is the name of an old Greek Phanariote family of Byzantine origin, whose members played important political role in the history of Greece.

== Notable members ==
- Carol J. Vlastos, American politician
- Georgios Vlastos (born 1964), Greek football striker and later manager
- Gregory Vlastos (1907–1991), scholar of ancient philosophy
- Kostia Vlastos (1883–1967) Greek scion of a family of bankers
- Sifis Vlastos (?), fifteenth century Cretan rebel

== See also ==
- Vlasto
