= Kevin Brown (author) =

American biographer

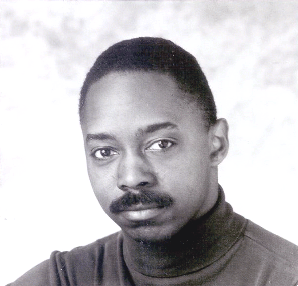
- Born: September 3, 1960 (age 66); Kansas City, Missouri, U.S.
- Education: City University of New York (CUNY)
- Occupations: Writer; essayist; critic; translator
- Years active: from 1978
- Organization: PEN American Center

Kevin Brown (born September 3, 1960) is an American biographer, essayist, translator, and author. Born in Kansas City, Missouri, Brown developed an interest in writing after completing high school in 1977. While pursuing his studies at Columbia University and City University of New York, he wrote literature reviews and essays for Threepenny Review.

Moving forward, Brown wrote, contributed, or anthologized in Afterimage, American Book Review, Washington Post, and many more. Furthermore, Brown has authored biographies for Romare Bearden (Romare Bearden: Artist) in 1994, and Malcolm X (Malcolm X: His Life and Legacy) in 1995. As well as a contributing editor to the African American Desk Reference in 1999.

== Early life ==
Kevin Brown was born in Kansas City, Missouri in 1960, from mother, Duan Nimmons, whose family had been active in the Harlem Renaissance and father John Brown a writer and a football running back. Before primary school, he traveled around Western Europe and North Africa with his father. In the late 60s, Brown lived in the Haight Ashbury district of San Francisco, attending Twin Peaks Elementary School. In the early 1970s, he lived in the Bay Area peninsula, in San Mateo and Santa Clara counties, attending Ralston Middle School in Belmont, California, as well as Rancho Junior High and Samuel Ayer High School in Milpitas, California, a suburb of San Jose. He graduated from Southeast High School in Kansas City, Missouri (1977). From 1978 to 1979, he lived in St. Louis, Missouri, reading, writing, and waiting tables.

== Higher education and partial career ==
From 1980 to 1984, in San Francisco, Brown studied Latin and Greek with a private tutor, reading widely in the works of the ancients and the French as well as contemporary post-war writers like Gore Vidal. He began publishing book reviews on writers like Zora Neale Hurston, Samuel Pepys and Virginia Woolf in newspapers such as the Oakland Tribune. Furthermore longer essays on Carlos Saura, and James Baldwin in the Threepenny Review.

In 1985, Brown worked as an editorial assistant in the publishing industry in New York, and contributed to The Times Literary Supplement.

In 1986, Brown moved to New York, attending the Columbia University School of General Studies for one year before transferring to the City University of New York. There, he double-majored in Spanish as well as Translating & Interpreting, completing his undergraduate degree in the CUNY Baccalaureate for Unique and Interdisciplinary Studies, headquartered at the Graduate Center of the City University of New York. He studied with literary translator Gregory Rabassa, among others.

From 1987 to 1989, Brown was a regular contributor to Kirkus Reviews, where he published book reviews on subjects as various as Africa, African-American writers, 20th century American poetry, Anglo-American common law, Australian-New Zealand writers, French history and literature, the Harlem Renaissance, music, photography, politics.

During the 1990s, he traveled in Central America and Eastern Europe, contributed to the American Book Review, American Visions and New York Newsday, and contracted to begin work on a series of biographies on Romare Bearden, Malcolm X and Countee Cullen.

In 1994, Brown's biography of Romare Bearden, Romare Bearden: Artist, was released.

In 1995, Brown's biography of Malcolm X Malcolm X: His Life and Legacy was released. Commissioned in 1993, just after the release of Spike Lee's movie on the same subject, Brown's second book attempts to chronicle the rise and fall of Malcolm X as well as that of rival leader Martin Luther King against the backdrop of the civil rights and black nationalist movements.

In 1999, Brown was a contributing editor for the book African American Desk Reference about essential information on African American history. Brown provided chapter 14 on music.

Brown's 2005 translation into Spanish of Virginia Woolf's little known essay "Reviewing" appeared in the Iowa University journal of literary translation eXchanges.

In 2006, his profile-interview of translator Gregory Rabassa was published in 2006 by the University of Delaware's Review of Latin American Studies.

Throughout his career, Brown contributed essays and articles for Afterimage, Apuntes, Asymptote, The Best American Essays 2021, The Brooklyn Rail, The Chattahoochee Review, The Delaware Review of Latin American Studies, eXchanges, Fiction International, Georgia Review, Hayden's Ferry Review, The Kansas City Star, Mayday, Metamorphoses, The Nation, Rain Taxi, Salmagundi, Two Lines, Washington Post, etc.

== Personal ==
=== Current family life ===
Brown lived in New York for 22 years, from 1985 to 2007, during which time he married and had a son. Brown returned to California in 2007, and currently lives in San Diego.

=== Family history ===
Brown's career and writing were influenced by his family history. His father, John Brown, was a writer and running back with the late 1950s Iowa Hawkeyes football team who played in the 1959 Rose Bowl. In the mid-1960s, John Brown was acquainted with writers William S. Burroughs, Ted Joans, and other writers of the Beat Generation. Brown's mother, Duan Nimmons, was born (1940) in New York City, where her family had been active in the Harlem Renaissance of the 1920s and early 1930s. His maternal great-grandmother was Ida Mae Roberson (later, Ida Cullen-Cooper), widow of Harlem Renaissance poet Countee Cullen.

== Partial bibliography ==
=== Biographies ===
- Brown, Kevin (1995). Romare Bearden. New York: Chelsea House. ISBN 0-7910-1119-4. OCLC 29878239.
- Brown, Kevin (1995). Malcolm X : his life and legacy. Brookfield, Conn.: Millbrook Press. ISBN 1-56294-500-9. OCLC 31044784.

=== Contributing editor ===
- The New York Public Library African American desk reference. New York: J. Wiley & Sons. 1999. ISBN 0-471-23924-0. OCLC 43421314.

=== Selected essays, articles & reviews ===
- "The Soul and the Dance" (On Carlos Saura). The Threepenny Review, Volume 18. (Summer 1984) pages 20–22.
- "The Epistles of James". (On James Baldwin) The Threepenny Review, Volume 19. (Autumn 1984), pages 6–8.
- "Woolf diary, Sackville-West letters shed a new light on both women's lives" (On Virginia Woolf) Oakland Tribune, (April 10, 1984), D4
- "Images of the Spirit". (On Graciela Iturbide) Afterimage, Volume 34.6 (May/June 2007), pages 33–34.
- "After the Renaissance: The Life of W.E.B. Du Bois". (On W. E. B. Du Bois) The Nation, (11 December 2000), pages 52–57.

=== Selected translations ===
- Virginia Woolf, "Reviewing" (1939). eXchanges: a Journal of Literary Translation ("Saints and Sinners" Issue, Winter 2006)
- Utah State University Digital Library, "Latino/a Voices Project": Ana Cecilia Barragán interview July 27, 2007.
- Utah State University Digital Library, "Latino/a Voices Project": Jorge Rodas interview July 13, 2007.
- Bartolomé, Herman Efraín; Brown, Kevin (2014). Ocosingo war diary : voices from Chiapas. Philadelphia. ISBN 978-0-9887903-3-9. OCLC 890614972.

=== As interviewer ===
- "Gregory Rabassa: An Interview". Delaware Review of Latin American Studies, Volume 7 Number 2 December 30, 2006.

=== As interviewee ===
- "Blueprint for Writing: An Interview with Kevin Brown". Harlem Arts Journal, Spring 2000.
