= James S. Vlasto =

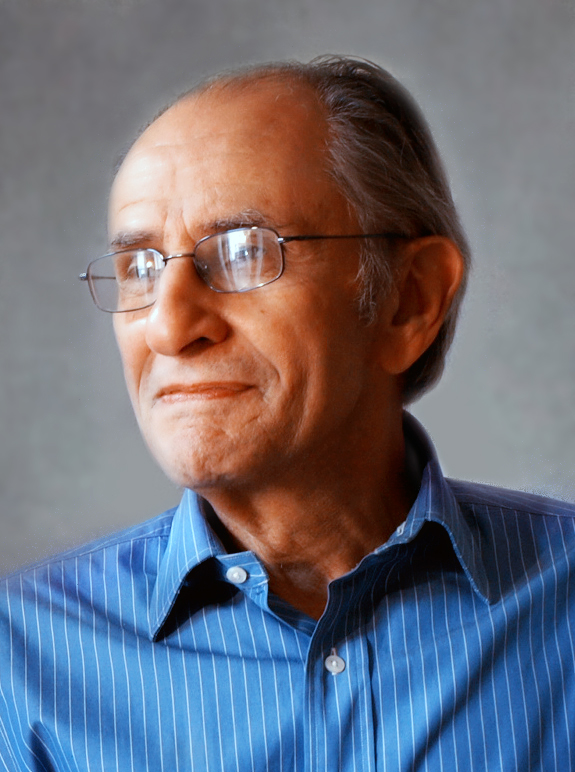
- Born: Dimitrius Solon Vlasto; June 11, 1934; New York, New York, US
- Died: January 19, 2017 (aged 82); Manhattan, New York, US
- Education: Columbia University
- Occupations: Editor; Political advisor; Public Relations Representative
- Children: 3

Dimitrius Solon "James" Vlasto (June 11, 1934 – January 19, 2017) was an American editor, political public relations consultant and public servant who served in federal, New York state and city senior government positions.

== Early life and education ==
Vlasto was born to a prominent family of Greek descent in Manhattan, New York City, the son of Solon G. Vlasto, publisher of the Atlantis, the first Greek language daily newspaper published in the United States.

He attended NYC public schools, the Hackley School located in Tarrytown, New York, Greenwich High School and Columbia University School of General Studies.

From November 1953 to October 1955 he served in the United States Army (post Korean War) in the 1st Cavalry Division at Hokkaido, Japan.

== Journalism ==
Vlasto joined the Atlantis in 1956 after his service in the United States Army. He worked on the business side of the newspaper and later as a reporter and finally managing editor until he resigned in 1964 to join the campaign staff of United States Senator Kenneth B. Keating of New York.

While managing editor, he hired Pete Hamill as illustrator and later lead writer for articles in the Monthly Illustrated Atlantis Magazine. Vlasto, a fight fan, agreed to let Hamill publish the first English article in the monthly magazine about Hamill’s friend, Puerto Rican professional boxer José Torres, then a neophyte middleweight and Olympic champion and who became light heavyweight Champion of the World. Hamill went on to become a journalist and best-selling author.

== Early campaigning ==
While managing editor of the Atlantis, Vlasto volunteered for political campaigns. His first position was assistant to the press secretary in Nelson A. Rockefeller’s 1958 campaign for Governor of New York.

He also worked in the press office for the campaign of Louis J. Lefkowitz in the New York City mayoral election in 1961 as well as in the re-election campaign of Senator Jacob K. Javits in the New York state election in 1962.

=== Presidential campaigns ===
Besides his position as Director of Nationalities Press for presidential candidate Richard Nixon in the United States presidential election in New York, 1960, Vlasto was also New York state public relations advisor for Senator George McGovern in the United States presidential election in New York, 1972, a member of the finance committee for presidential candidate Michael Dukakis in the United States presidential election in New York, 1988 and New York State public relations advisor for Mo Udall's run for the Democratic nomination for President in 1976.

== Political consulting ==
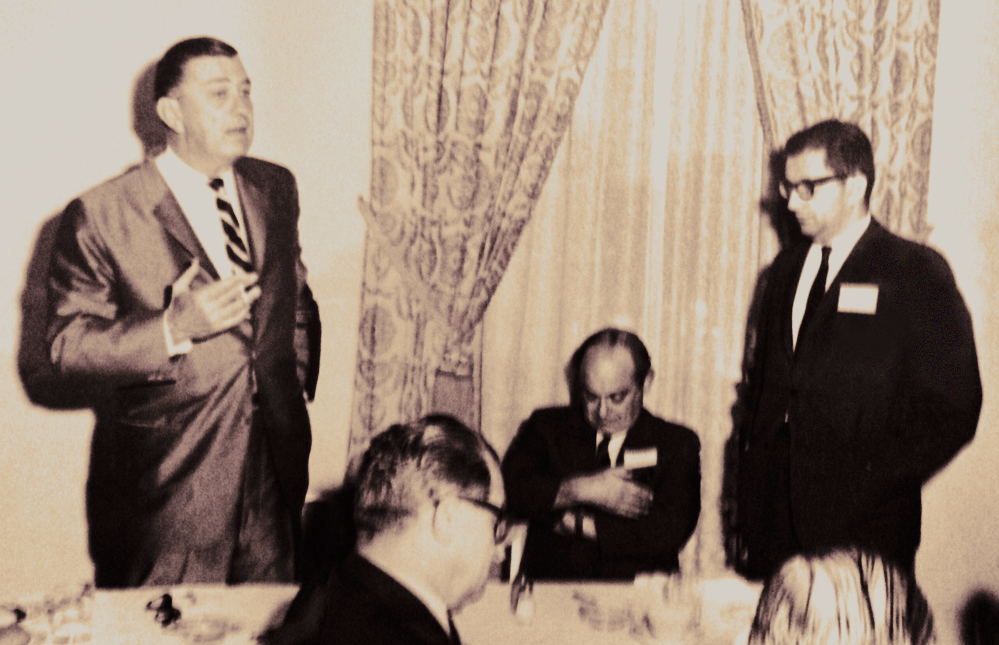
Franklin Delano Roosevelt, Jr. 1966

=== Kenneth Keating ===
In December 1963, lawyer Eugene T. Rossides, the All-American quarterback for Columbia University in the late 1940s and who served in high positions in the Eisenhower Administration was named campaign manager for the re-election campaign of Incumbent Republican U.S. Senator Kenneth B. Keating of NY. Rossides appointed Vlasto as traveling Press Officer.

=== Franklin Delano Roosevelt, Jr. ===
In March 1966, Franklin Delano Roosevelt, Jr. hired Vlasto to do PR for his campaign for Governor of New York on the Liberal Party ticket in 1966 against the incumbent Republican Nelson A. Rockefeller. Roosevelt retained Vlasto after the campaign when Roosevelt moved to Washington, allowing Vlasto to use his office in New York City.

=== Herman Badillo ===
Vlasto worked as press secretary for former Bronx Borough President Herman Badillo during his run for mayor in the New York City mayoral election in 1969. Badillo placed third in the Democratic primary behind nominee Mario Procaccino and former mayor Robert Wagner, Jr.

Vlasto also was spokesman for Badillo during his second run for mayor in the 1973 New York City mayoral election, forcing a runoff after placing a strong second to Abraham Beame in the Democratic primary and his run for mayor in 2001.

== Public relations ==
From January 1965 to April 1976, Vlasto established James S. Vlasto Associates, a public relations firm based in New York City and representing the following candidates for public office:

Vlasto was Press Advisor to Member of the U.S. House of Representatives Jonathan Brewster Bingham from the 23rd District of New York, a district in the Bronx.

In 1965, Vlasto was press advisor to Congressman William Fitts Ryan a candidate for the Democratic nomination for Mayor of New York City who finished third behind Abraham Beame and Paul Screvane.

In 1972, Vlasto was press advisor to Congresswoman Elizabeth Holtzman of NY who upset United States House Committee on the Judiciary chairman Emanuel Celler, the fifty-year incumbent and the House's longest serving member at that time. Holtzman took her seat in the 93rd Congress (1973–1975), at the age of 31, and became the youngest woman ever to serve in the House.

Vlasto was press advisor for then Assemblyman Andrew Stein of New York from 1969 to 1974

Vlasto was Communications Director for Richard L. Ottinger in the Democratic Party Primary for the United States Senate election in New York in 1970 against Republican U.S. Senator Charles Goodell and Conservative Party of New York nominee James L. Buckley.

In 1973, Vlasto was Communication Director for former New York City Finance Administrator, Richard Lewisohn’s campaign for NYC Comptroller on a ticket headed by Republican State Senator John J. Marchi, who was seeking to become mayor in the New York City mayoral election, 1973 in a run against Democrat Abraham Beame.

President and Archbishop Makarios of Cyprus

Eugene Rossides, Assistant Secretary of the U.S. Treasury from 1969 to 1973 and creator of the American Hellenic Institute which organized and led a successful battle in Congress to impose an arms embargo on Turkey following the 1974 invasion and subsequent occupation of Cyprus arranged for Vlasto to handle the media for Makarios III archbishop and primate of the autocephalous Church of Cyprus, a Greek Orthodox Church (1950–1977), and the first President of the Republic of Cyprus.

Archbishop Makarios had three meetings with U.S. Secretary of State Henry Kissinger, during which they discussed U.S. policy on Cyprus, US involvement in the 1974 Cypriot coup d'état by the Cypriot National Guard, the Greek military junta of 1967–1974 and the Turkish invasion of Cyprus and initiatives which Makarios wanted the United States to undertake so that Turkey would withdraw from the island.

== Under Hugh Carey ==
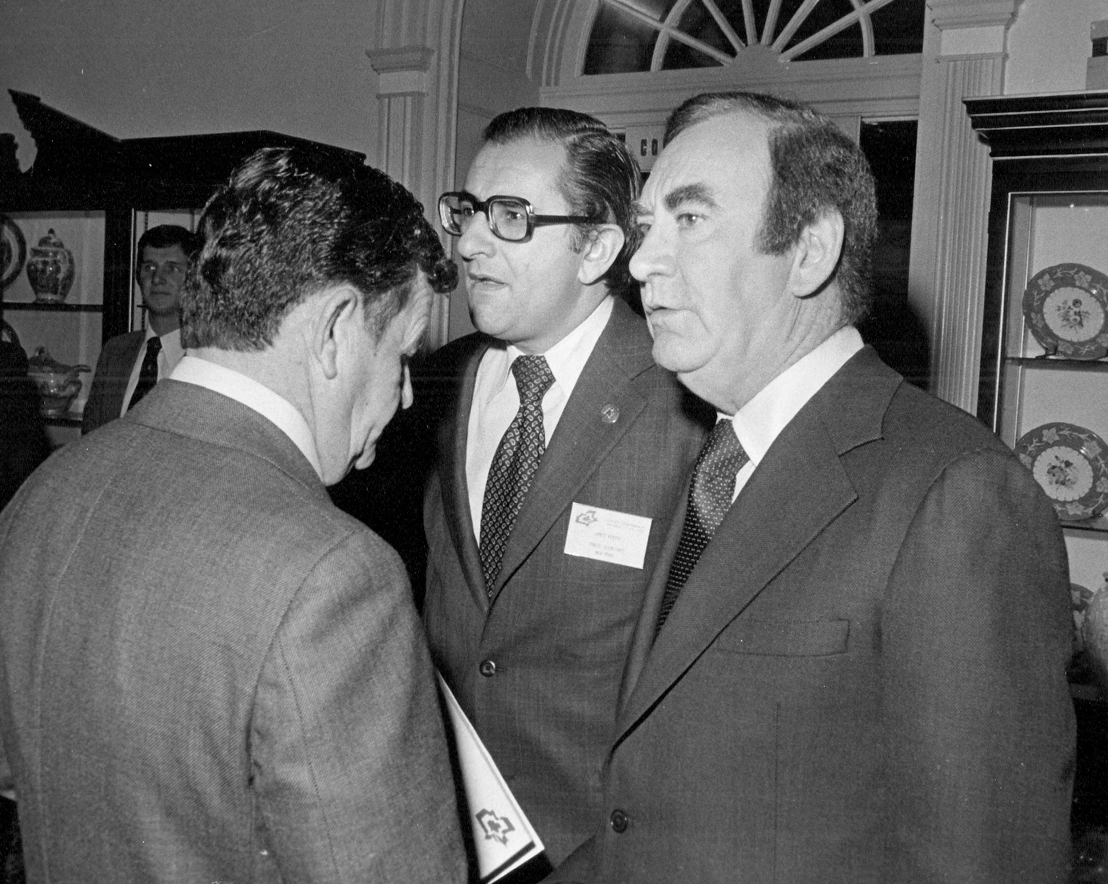
Governor Carey in 1973 with Press Secretary James Vlasto

In 1976, Governor Hugh Carey named Vlasto as press secretary on a recommendation by Executive Director of the New York City Financial Control Board, Stephen Berger.

During Carey's term as governor, New York City was on the verge of bankruptcy, Carey created the Municipal Assistance Corporation, known as MAC, to borrow money for the city and the Financial Control Board with the power to reject city budgets and labor contracts bringing together bankers and businessmen, politicians and labor leaders.

Vlasto during those critical days recalled the tense, exhausting negotiations, "We were working 18-hour days. With bankers and labor leaders shut up in the same room, it wasn't exactly a marriage made in heaven. But they all learned to respect each other and Carey's personality --and he was a very complicated man – won them over. He could make you laugh and cry. He was a great storyteller. He made enemies but he didn't let that stop him. Carey had a gift for hiring good people to staff his administration – and many politicians agree."

Vlasto resigned in 1977 and Carey said, "I could not have had a finer press secretary," and called Vlasto, "a trusted advisor and friend."

== Public relations ==
In January 1978 to 1990, Vlasto reestablished his public relations firm Vlasto & Co., which represented various corporations and non-profit organizations including: Touche Ross, New York City Partnership, and CEO’s of major corporations including Paul Milstein, Jerry Finkelstein and Robert J. Congel founder of The Pyramid Companies.

== Work in New York City ==
From January 1990 to July 1993, Vlasto was Press Secretary and Executive Director for Public Affairs to New York City Public Schools Chancellor Joseph A. Fernandez.

In April 1995 until May 2001 he was also Director of Communications for New Visions for Public Schools a non-profit that assisted in the New York City Public School System by developing programs and raising private funds.

From April 2003 to April 2008, Vlasto was Director of Communications for Public Advocate for the City of New York, Betsy Gotbaum.

== Veterans and the Medal of Honor ==
In 2008, Vlasto, with the assistance from Paul W. Bucha, recipient of the Medal of Honor, Vietnam 1968, and Morton Dean, former anchor and correspondent for CBS and ABC News, formed the Homer L. Wise Memorial Committee to raise funds and successfully erected a Bronze Statue of World War II Medal of Honor Recipient Master Sergeant Homer L. Wise. The statue was dedicated on May 26, 2013, in Veterans Park in Stamford, Connecticut.

Vlasto was at the time of his death the editor of Medal of Honor News, a website dedicated to honoring Medal of Honor recipients – members of the United States Armed Forces who distinguished themselves through "conspicuous gallantry and intrepidity at the risk of his or her life above and beyond the call of duty while engaged in an action against an enemy of the United States."

== Personal life ==
Vlasto had three children – a daughter, Tima Vlasto, author and web developer, his oldest son, Christopher J. Vlasto, executive producer of Good Morning America and youngest son Josh Vlasto who served as press secretary to Senator Charles Schumer of New York and to Governor Andrew Cuomo of New York.

James Vlasto died of idiopathic pulmonary fibrosis on January 19, 2017, at the age of 82.
