= Ingrid Bengis =

American writer

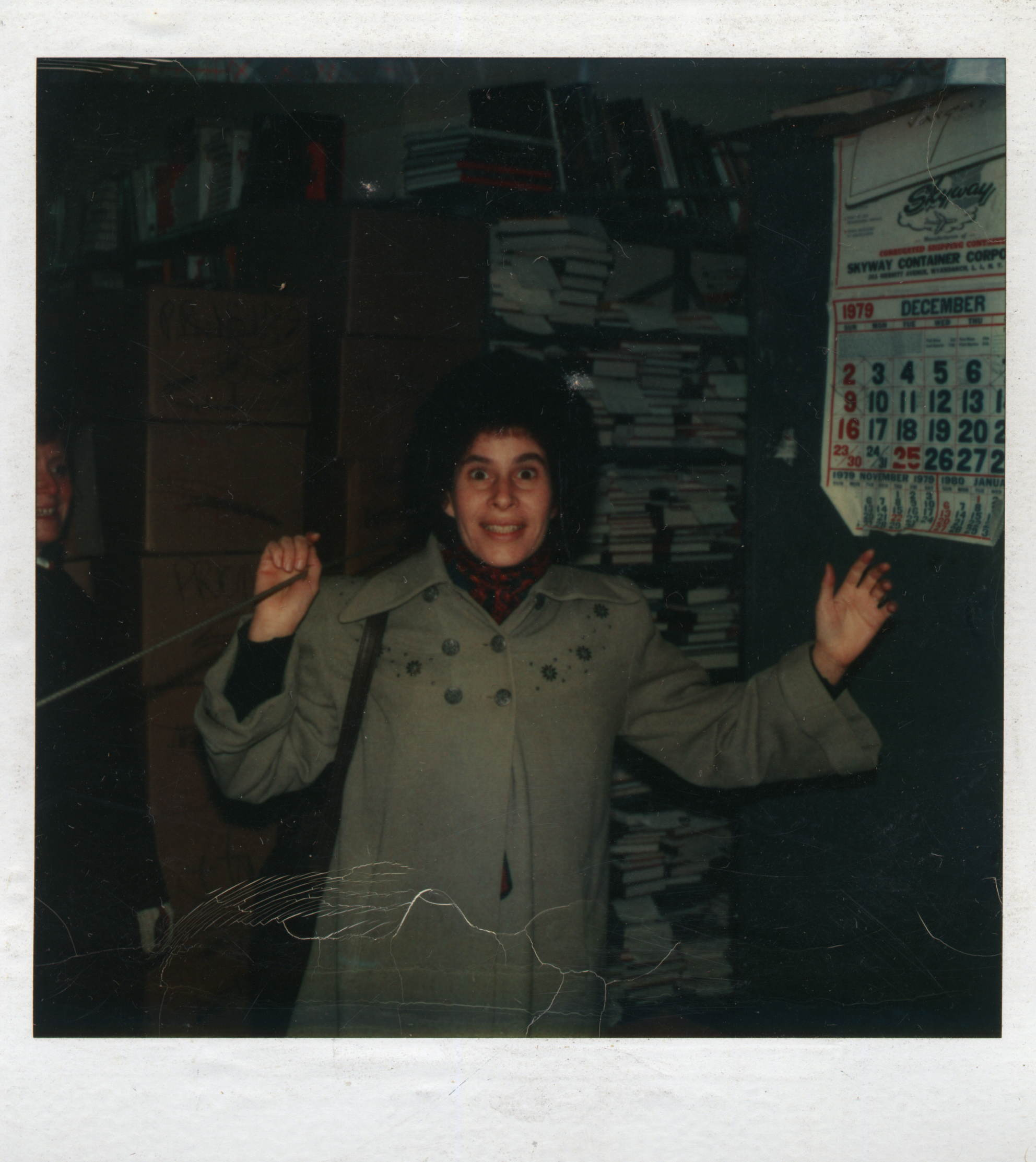
- Ingrid Bengis at the rope in the basement of the Strand Bookstore (1979)
- Born: Ingrid Anne Bengis; Ингрид Энн Бенгис; August 14, 1944 New York City, New York, U.S.
- Died: July 13, 2017 (aged 72) Stonington, Maine, U.S.
- Occupation: Writer; scholar; fishmonger; businessperson
- Education: Columbia University, 1970
- Notable works: Combat in the Erogenous Zone (1972)
- Spouse: Edouard Palei (m. 1998)
- Children: 1

Ingrid Anne Bengis-Palei (née Bengis; Russian: Ингрид Энн Бенгис-Палей; 1944–2017), known professionally as Ingrid Bengis (Russian: Ингрид Бенгис), was an American writer, scholar, fishmonger and businessperson based in Stonington, Maine and St. Petersburg, Russia. In 1973, Bengis was nominated for a National Book Award for Combat in the Erogenous Zone (1972).

== Early life and education ==
Ingrid Anne Bengis was born on August 14, 1944 in Manhattan, New York City to a Jewish–Russian parents. Bengis' mother, Maria Bengis (née Sklar), was born to a Jewish family in Odesa, Russian Empire (present-day Ukraine) and fled to the United States in 1921. Bengis' father, Lev Maximovich Bengis, was born to a Jewish family in Vilnius, Congress Poland (present-day, Lithuania). Bengis' paternal grandparents, aunts and uncles died during the holocaust.

Bengis grow up in Manhattan and Amsterdam, New York. Bengis' younger brother, Steven Bengis (1947–2015), was a psychologist known for co-founding the NEARI School and for being the director of the Massachusetts Adolescent Sexual Offender Coalition (MASOC).

Bengis graduated from Wilbur H. Lynch High School in 1961. In 1970, Bengis graduated from Columbia University School of General Studies.

== Career ==
=== Writer ===
She is best known for her pioneering collection of essays on love, hate and sexuality, Combat in the Erogenous Zone, (Knopf 1972). The book received critical acclaim and was nominated for a National Book Award. The New York Times Book Review said, "It must be read and it must be taken seriously if human sexuality is ever going to live up to its notices," while Newsweek called it "a remarkable book...that has probably moved both women and men on a deeper level than any other document of the new feminism." It was reissued in 1990 after Martin Duberman, writing in The Village Voice asked, "Where is this astonishing writer? Why has she dropped from sight". The reissue by HarperCollins included a new introduction by Duberman, in which he wrote, "(Bengis) was only twenty eight when the book was published, but had lived so intensely and could describe her experiences so freshly...that her ruminations about love, hate and sex struck many of us who were older than she as astonishingly vivid and wise. Nearly twenty years later, they still do." Among the most frequently cited quotes from the book are "Imagination has always had powers of resurrection that no science can match" and "For me, words are a form of action, capable of influencing change", quoted by Barack Obama in one of his 2008 campaign speeches.

In 2003, Farrar, Straus & Giroux, North Point Press published Bengis' book Metro Stop Dostoyevsky: Travels in Russian Time which takes place in Russia between 1990-1996. Naively in love with Russia and Russian literature, she settled in St. Petersburg in 1990 as the Soviet Union was collapsing, and quickly became immersed in "catastroika", a period of immense turmoil that mirrored her own increasingly complex and contradictory experience. Her friendship with a Russian woman whose marriage is also falling apart, reflects the social tumult, as well as the sometimes dangerous consequences, of American good intentions. It was hailed by Kurt Vonnegut as "the most sane and intelligent book anyone could possibly write about what it is like to be an American or a Russian at the start of the new millennium," and Norman Mailer said "There is so much to praise about Metro Stop Dostoyevsky that I will content myself with but one remark. I read it all in something approaching whole pleasure, and how often can we make such a claim?"

She is also the author of a novel, I Have Come here to be Alone (Simon & Schuster, 1977) and a contributor to many magazines and journals. Her work has been translated into six languages, most recently Russian, where her essay Home: Variations on a Theme appeared in the highly respected literary magazine Zvezda.

=== Ingrid Bengis Seafood ===
Bengis founded Ingrid Bengis Seafood in 1985 and owned and managed the establishment for 30 years. She developed a special connection between the fishermen of Maine and the elite chefs of the United States.

In 2005, Bengis was one of four shellfish dealers in Stonington.

== Personal life ==
In 1998, Bengis married Edouard Palei, a Russian ballet dancer. Bengis-Palei had one daughter and one stepson.

On July 13, 2017 Bengis died of cancer in 2017 in Stonington, Maine.

== Bibliography ==
- Bengis, Ingrid (1972). Combat in the Erogenous Zone (1 ed.). New York City: Alfred A. Knopf. ISBN 9780394475509. Distributed by Random House.
- Bengis, Ingrid (1976). I Have Come Here to Be Alone. New York City: Simon and Schuster. ISBN 9780671223304.
- Bengis, Ingrid (2003). Metro Stop Dostoevsky: Travels in Russian Time (1 ed.). New York City: North Point Press. ISBN 978-0865476721.
