= Manuel Bromberg =

American artist (1917–2022)

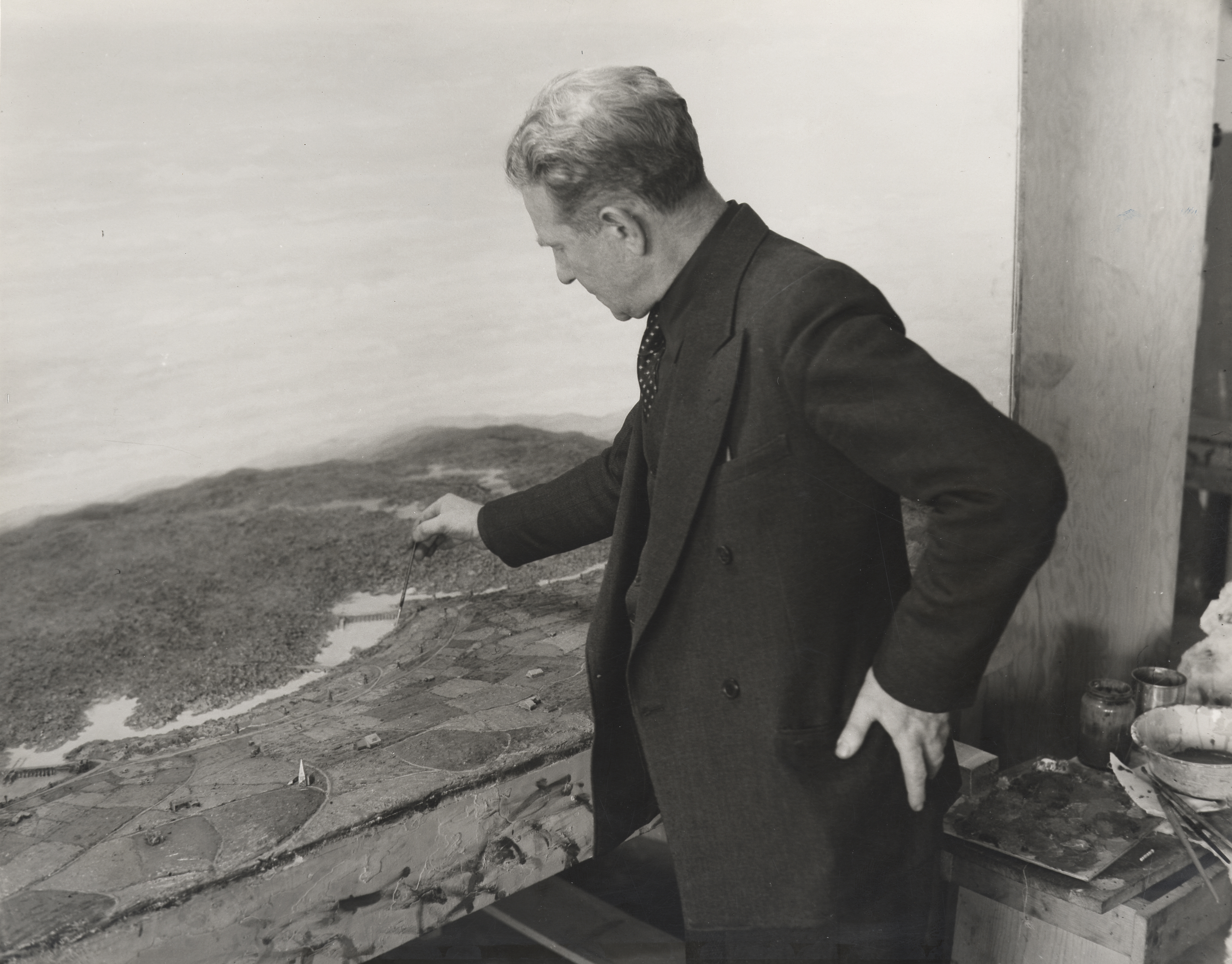
- Born: Manuel Abraham Bromberg; March 6, 1917; Centerville, Iowa, U.S.
- Died: February 3, 2022 (aged 104)
- Education: Cleveland Institute of Art; Colorado Springs Fine Arts Center
- Occupation: Artist
- Employers: North Carolina State University; State University of New York at New Paltz; Works Progress Administration
- Spouse: Jane Dow (m. 1941–2008; her death)
- Children: 2, including Susan Mesinai
- Awards: Guggenheim Fellowship (1946); Legionnaire of Legion of Merit

Manuel Abraham Bromberg (March 6, 1917 – February 3, 2022) was an American artist and educator. He served in the United States Army as Official War Artist for the European Theater of Operations during World War II. Bromberg was a Professor Emeritus of Art, at the State University of New York at New Paltz. He was a 1946 Guggenheim Fellow.

== Life ==
Bromberg was born in Centerville, Iowa, to David Bromberg, an immigrant from Germany, and Tonata Sobul, an immigrant from Poland. At the age of 16, Bromberg was chosen the winner of the prestigious George Bellows Award, a national art competition among high school students. First prize was a year's scholarship to the Pratt Institute in New York City, but he opted instead to accept a full scholarship to the Cleveland School of Art. He studied at the Colorado Springs Fine Arts Center, with Boardman Robinson and Henry Varnum Poor, from 1932 to 1940.

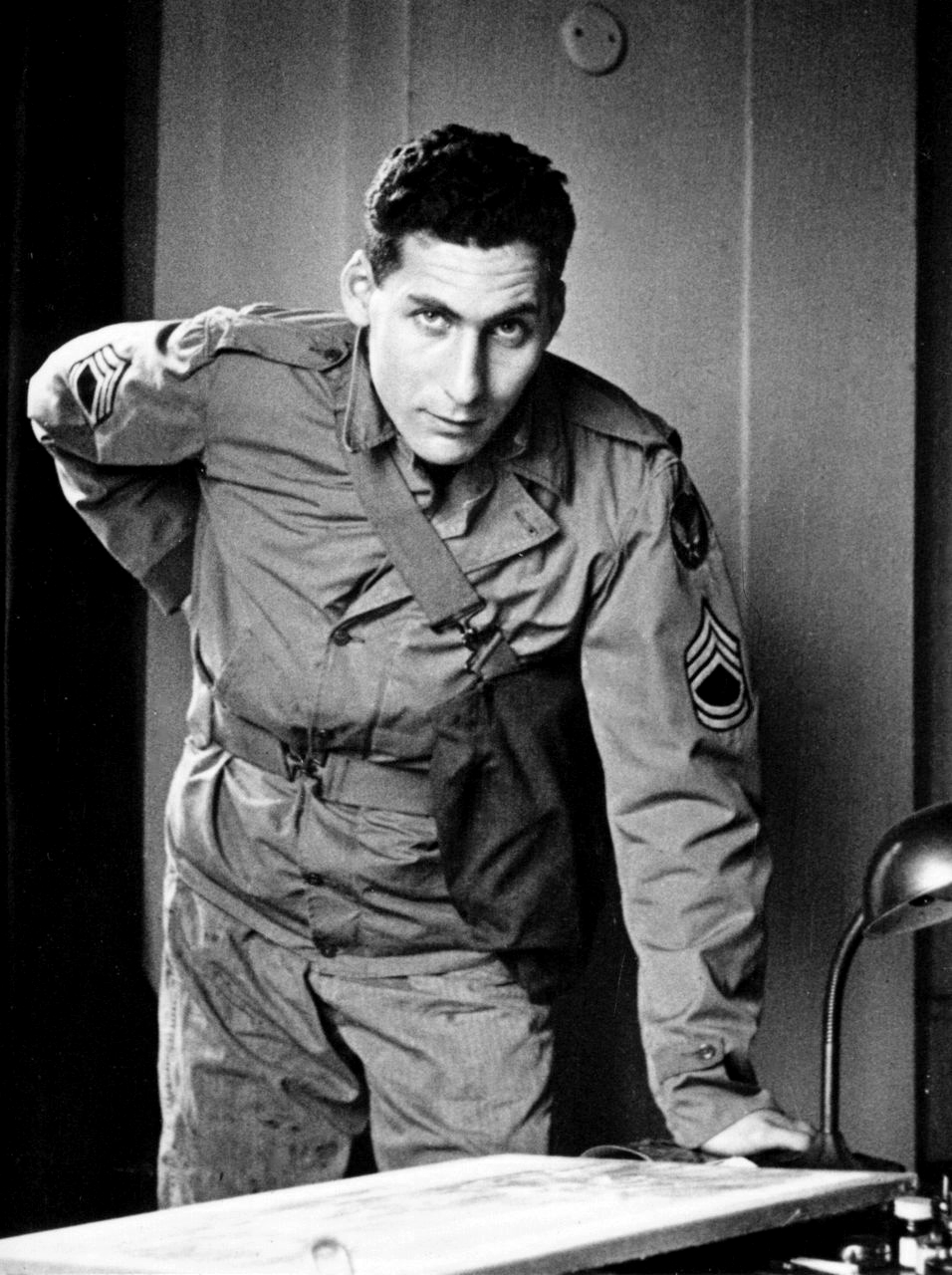
Technical Sgt. Manuel Bromberg, World War II

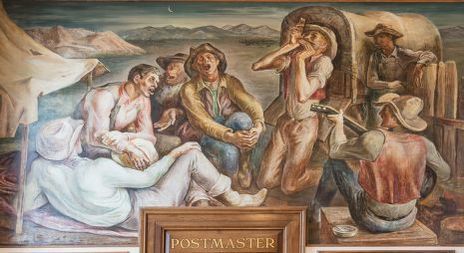
Chuck Wagon Serenade (1940), post office mural in Greybull, Wyoming

Bromberg completed three murals for the New Deal's Section of Fine Arts: Greybull, Wyoming, Tahlequah, Oklahoma, and Geneva, Illinois. Bromberg married Jane Dow in Woodstock, New York, in December 1941.

In 1943, at the age of 26, Bromberg was appointed by George Biddle, chairman of the War Department Art Advisory Board, as an official war artist. Bromberg was assigned to serve with the European Theater of Operations (England, France and Germany) and landed on Omaha Beach in June 1944. While in France, Bromberg met Pablo Picasso, Jean Cocteau, and Georges Braque.

In 1944, he was awarded the Legion of Merit.

Bromberg taught at Salem College, North Carolina State University College of Design, from 1949 to 1954, where he collaborated with Buckminster Fuller and others to form Skybreak Carolina Corp. In 1953, Bromberg was commissioned to create a mural for the student union building of NCSU.

In the 1960s, while Professor of Painting at the State University of New York at New Paltz, Bromberg created a series of monumentally-scaled castings of cliff faces. One of Bromberg's cliff sculptures appears in the permanent collection of Storm King Art Center.

Bromberg lived in Woodstock, New York. He turned 100 in March 2017, and died on February 3, 2022, at the age of 104.
