= Carol J. Vlastos =

Wyoming politician

Member of the Wyoming House of Representatives from the Natrona district
- In office 1989–1992

Carol J. Vlastos is an American Democratic politician from Casper, Wyoming. She represented the Natrona district in the Wyoming House of Representatives from 1989 to 1992.
