= Eytan Schwartz =

Israeli communications expert

- איתן שוורץ
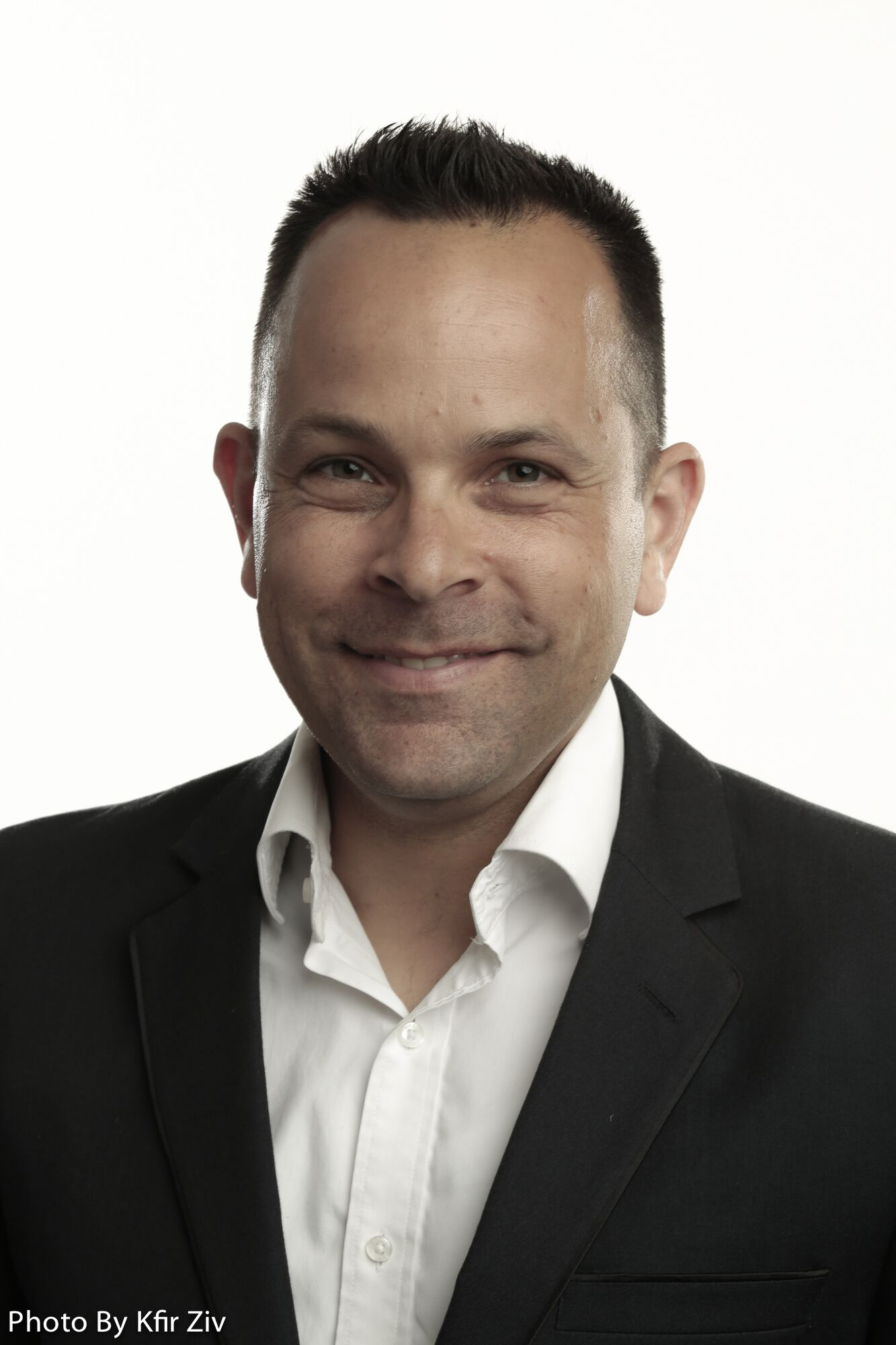
- Schwartz in 2019
- Education: Columbia University
- Occupations: Spokesperson, Reporter
- Known for: Winning "The Ambassador"
- Website: www.EytanSchwartz.com

Eytan Schwartz (Hebrew: איתן שוורץ) is an Israeli communications and public relations expert. He won the first season of "The Ambassador", a popular Israeli reality TV show that focused on creating better PR for Israel.

== Biography ==
Eytan Schwartz was born in New York City and emigrated to Israel with his family when he was 7. From a young age, he showed an interest in the performing arts, and participated in various plays. He was also a member of a children's choir and performed with the Israeli Opera. His interest in the arts continued throughout his teens; he attended the Thelma Yellin High School for the performing arts as a drama major and played the lead role in the Israeli national production of Neil Simon's Lost in Yonkers.

After high school, he joined the Israeli Army and served as an entertainment correspondent for the Military Radio Station, Galei Zahal.

After completing four years of service, he traveled to Paris and joined a local theatre group. Afterwards, Schwartz attended university in New York City, graduating summa cum laude from Columbia University with a B.A in anthropology. He also acted in several theatrical productions.

== Media career ==
Upon returning to Israel, Schwartz joined The Israeli Children's Television Network and served as editor and reporter on a daily news show for children. He then became an entertainment reporter on a daily entertainment news show on Israeli cable television.

In September 2004 Schwartz joined "The Ambassador", a ground-breaking reality show that focused on creating better PR for Israel. During the following 4 months, he competed with 13 other men and women on the right to represent Israel abroad with an NYC-based advocacy group, Israel at Heart. Finally, in a show aired to unprecedented ratings on February 20, 2005, he won the contest, and began working for "Israel at Heart" in April 2005.

In March 2005, American journalist David Kaufman published an article about Schwartz in New York magazine, in which he referred to Schwartz as the Bill Rancic of Israel.

Schwartz was the spokesperson for C.A.R.D., the Committee for Advancement of Refugees from Darfur and a project manager for Tel Aviv's Centennial celebrations.

== Political career ==
In 2013, he ran on the Labor Party list in the Knesset elections
