= Lovens Gjed =

Entrepreneur

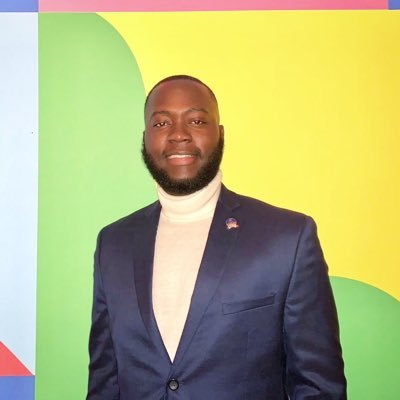
- Gjed at the 2019 Forbes Under 30 Summit
- Born: December 27, 1995 (age 30); Gonaives, Haiti
- Education: Columbia University
- Occupation: Entrepreneur
- Years active: 2017–present

Lovens Gjed (born December 27, 1995) is a Haitian-American entrepreneur, best known as the founder of MEnvesti LLC.

== Early life and education ==
Gjed was born and raised in Gonaives, Haiti and immigrated to the United States for his college education in 2014. His family settled in the State of New York where he attended community college before transferring to Columbia University. In a radio interview with the United Nations, Gjed invited the youth to support the UN 2030 agenda and contribute to its success globally. Gjed has written in support of the implication of the Haitian diaspora in creating sustainable infrastructures in their home country. In December 2017, he founded MEnvesti LLC and later launched an eponym reward-based crowdfunding service to connect small lenders in the US to entrepreneurs in Haiti.

== Personal life ==
Gjed survived the 2004 Hurricane Jeanne that hit Gonaives, Haiti and grew up in a monoparental family.
