= Homer L. Wise =

United States Army soldier in World War II

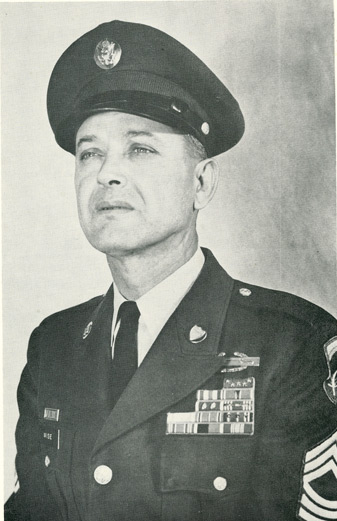
- Sgt. Homer L. Wise
- Born: February 27, 1917; Baton Rouge, Louisiana, US
- Died: April 22, 1974 (aged 57); Stamford, Connecticut, US
- Burial place: Saint John's Roman Catholic Cemetery, Darien, Connecticut
- Military career
- Allegiance: United States
- Branch: United States Army
- Service years: 1941–1945, 1947–1966
- Rank: First Sergeant
- Units: 142nd Infantry Regiment, 36th Infantry Division
- Conflicts: World War II: Italian Campaign; Operation Dragoon
- Awards: Medal of Honor; Silver Star; Bronze Star with Valor device Purple Heart (3); Croce di Guerra (Italy); Croix de Guerre (France)

Homer Lee Wise (February 27, 1917 – April 22, 1974) was a United States Army soldier who received the United States military's highest decoration—the Medal of Honor—for his actions in World War II.

After dropping out of school and working odd jobs he joined the Army at the age of 24 and after completing training was sent to Europe during World War II to fight in the Allied invasion of Italy. He continued fighting in various locations and battles throughout Europe, receiving the Medal of Honor, Silver Star, Bronze Star and Purple Heart for his actions in combat.

After he was discharged from the Army he worked at a local college before re-enlisting in the Army. He retired as a first sergeant in 1966. He was one of the six honorary pall bearers at the dedication of the Tomb of the Unknowns and was a guest of the President of the United States at the inaugurations of Presidents Eisenhower, Richard Nixon and Lyndon Johnson.

When he died in 1974 he was buried in Darien, Connecticut.

== Early life and family ==
Born in Baton Rouge, Louisiana, Wise grew up with a love of hunting and fishing. He left school after the eighth grade and worked odd jobs in Texas. At age 24 in 1941, he enlisted in the U.S. Army in Baton Rouge.

While stationed at Camp Edwards in 1942 on Cape Cod in Massachusetts, Wise met Madolyn DiSesa; the couple became engaged in January 1943 and married on February 12, 1945. DiSesa was from Stamford, Connecticut, and for the next 30 years they lived together in Stamford, having one child, a son Jeffrey, in 1949. Jeffrey died in 1990 at age 40.

== World War II service ==
From April to September 1943, Wise trained with the 36th Infantry Division in North Africa. He first entered combat on September 9 during the landings at Salerno, Italy, and continued to serve in the Italian Campaign for the next year. He fought in Naples and Rome and, on January 7, 1944, earned the Silver Star.

By June 14, 1944, he was serving as a staff sergeant in Company L, 142nd Infantry Regiment, 36th Infantry Division. On that day, in Magliano, Italy, Wise carried a wounded man to safety and repeatedly went ahead of his unit to engage the German forces alone. It was for his actions during this battle that he was later awarded the Medal of Honor. Only four days after his Medal of Honor action, on June 18, he suffered a shrapnel wound to the head and was awarded a Purple Heart.

Beginning in August 1944, Wise participated in the Allied invasion of southern France. On August 16 he earned a Bronze Star with V device for Valor and on August 22 a second Purple Heart for a bullet wound inflicted by a sniper. He was again shot by a sniper on September 22 and given a third Purple Heart for this wound. He was removed from combat in November and formally presented with the Medal of Honor by General Alexander Patch, commander of the Seventh Army, in Épinal, France. Among the other medals earned by Wise during the war were two foreign decorations, the Italian Croce di Guerra and the French Croix de Guerre.

== Later life ==
On July 21, 1945, he received an honorable discharge from the Army. Wise worked in Stamford, Connecticut, until 1947, when he re-enlisted in the Army and served in various recruiting and administrative roles. He was the director of Army recruiting in Stamford through 1959, interrupted by a two-year stint in Germany from 1952 to 1954. He served in France from 1961 to 1963, at Fort Devens, Massachusetts, from 1963 to 1965, and in Italy from 1965 to 1966. He retired from the military on December 21, 1966, having reached the rank of first sergeant, and returned to Stamford.

He was one of six honorary pall bearers at the dedication of the Tomb of the Unknowns on May 27, 1958, presided over by President Dwight D. Eisenhower. He was also a guest of the President of the United States at the inaugurations of Presidents Eisenhower, Richard Nixon and Lyndon Johnson.

Wise died in Stamford at age 57 of congestive heart failure. His widow died in 2002.

== Medal of Honor citation ==
Staff Sergeant Wise's official Medal of Honor citation reads:

While his platoon was pinned down by enemy small-arms fire from both flanks, he left his position of comparative safety and assisted in carrying 1 of his men, who had been seriously wounded and who lay in an exposed position, to a point where he could receive medical attention. The advance of the platoon was resumed but was again stopped by enemy frontal fire. A German officer and 2 enlisted men, armed with automatic weapons, threatened the right flank. Fearlessly exposing himself, he moved to a position from which he killed all 3 with his submachinegun. Returning to his squad, he obtained an M1 rifle and several antitank grenades, then took up a position from which he delivered accurate fire on the enemy holding up the advance. As the battalion moved forward it was again stopped by enemy frontal and flanking fire. He procured an automatic rifle and, advancing ahead of his men, neutralized an enemy machinegun with his fire. When the flanking fire became more intense he ran to a nearby tank and exposing himself on the turret, restored a jammed machinegun to operating efficiency and used it so effectively that the enemy fire from an adjacent ridge was materially reduced thus permitting the battalion to occupy its objective.

== Memorials ==
In 2008, James S. Vlasto with the assistance from Paul W. Bucha, recipient of the Medal of Honor, Vietnam 1968, and Morton Dean, former Anchor and correspondent for CBS and ABC News, formed the Homer L. Wise Memorial Committee to raise funds and successfully erected a Bronze Statue of World War II Medal of Honor Recipient Master Sergeant Homer L. Wise. The statue was dedicated on May 26, 2013, in Veterans Park in Stamford, Connecticut.

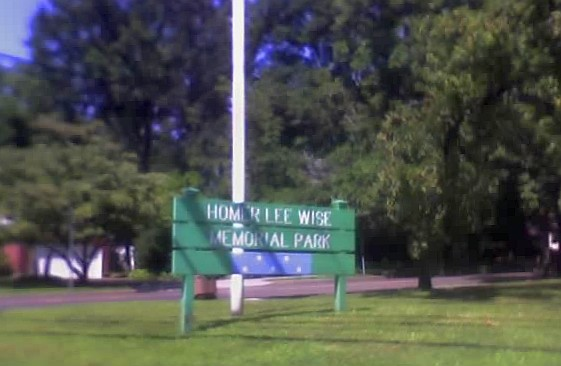
Homer Lee Wise Memorial Park Stamford CT

There is also a small park, the "Homer Lee Wise Memorial Park" at the corner of Chester and Bedford Streets in Stamford, Connecticut.

== See also ==
- List of Medal of Honor recipients for World War II
