= Herbert Kuhner =

Austrian writer and translator (born 1935)

- Born: 1935 (age 90–91); Vienna, Austria
- Occupations: Writer, translator
- Website: www.herbertkuhner.com

Herbert "Harry" Kuhner (born 1935 in Vienna) is an Austrian writer and translator.

== Life ==
Kuhner emigrated with his parents to the US in 1935 and graduated from Columbia University. He returned to Vienna in 1963, where he is still working as a writer and translator. He came up with the concept of remigration, which is "a neologism, which means coming back to where you have been driven out."

The President of Austria conferred on him the title of Professor.

Herbert Kuhner's translations have been advocating the literature of Austrian ethnic groups in particular and made them accessible for an English-speaking audience. Furthermore, he compiled an anthology of Austrian lyric poetry after 1945 through Schocken Books.

== Works ==
=== In English ===
- Herbert Kuhner: Nixe. Funk & Wagnalls, New York City 1968.
- Herbert Kuhner: Broadsides and Pratfalls: Selected Poems, Stories and Translations. The Menard Press, London 1976.
- Herbert Kuhner (Hrsg.): Austrian Poetry Today. Schocken Books, New York City 1985, ISBN 0-8052-3903-0.

=== In German ===
- Herbert Kuhner: Der Ausschluss. Memoiren eines Neununddreissigers. Wiener Verlag, Himberg 1988, ISBN 3-900915-00-8.
- Herbert Kuhner: Liebe zu Österreich. Der Apfel, Wien 1995, ISBN 3-85450-079-3.
- Herbert Kuhner: Minki die Nazi Katze und die menschliche Seite. Theodor Kramer Gesellschaft, Wien 1998, ISBN 3-901602-04-6.
