= Joy Leftow =

American poet

- Born: Washington Heights, New York City
- Education: Columbia University, B.A., 1983; Columbia University, MSW, 1985; City College of New York, M.A., 1991
- Occupations: poet, writer
- Children: Joey Leftow
- Writing career
- Notable works: A Spot of Bleach & Other Poems and Prose, Tupelo Honey

Joy Leftow (born in Washington Heights, New York City) is an American poet, fiction writer, essayist and artist.

Leftow's poetry is narrative and lyrical, and each poem tells a complete story. More recently, Leftow is exploring what she has labeled Bluetry, a rhythmic freestyle poetry, which she reads to music and which some reviewers have called "rap". Some poems have gained critical acclaim, such as "Tupelo Honey," "Advancing on Satori," and the more recent "Being Jewish," "My Mother," and "I Sing The Blues For You Today," all of which have been published in several journals. Her poems are often gritty and raw urban tales based on her unique observations and experience. Familiar themes in her work encompass analysis of identity and inclusion and family and social issues. She covers themes of overall inclusion and exclusion into various groups in general (the nuclear family) and organizations. Leftow's Jewish identity has become another developing theme along with her recent poetic performance /writing style, for which Leftow has created the name Bluetry, to describe her art form.

== Early life and education ==
Joy Leftow claims to have written her first poem on snowflakes when she was four years old. After dropping out of high school and living for some time on welfare, Leftow restarted her education under the auspices of the New York State Higher Education Opportunity Program and obtained a B.A. from Columbia University in anthropology. During her undergraduate studies, she began writing again by taking elective writing courses. Leftow continued her studies and obtained a post-graduate Masters of Science in Social Work degree from Columbia University in New York City and a Master of Fine Arts in Creative Writing from City College of New York. Leftow maintains her Licensed Clinical Social Work licensing with NY State.

== Career ==
Leftow frequently appears on New York City radio shows, such as the Teachers & Writers Collaborative Radio Show, Everything Goes, Poetry Central, The Sounds of Poetry on Adelphi Radio WBAU-FM, Jazz Poetry Café with Phillip Gregory on WFLO, Cool on the Groove on Rockland World Radio Program and Indiefeed Performance Poetry. She has also been featured on television programs such as The New Yorkers,. She has read her poetry at CBGB's, the Wetlands, Cornelia Street Cafe, Bowery Poetry Club, the Back Fence, Palmer Vineyards and the Paris Cafe. She organized and hosted the spoken word event at the 4th, 5th and 6th Annual Uptown Arts Stroll event.

In addition to working as a clinical social worker, Leftow taught youth literacy classes for young children through the Beacon After School Program. She was also a production editor for Augustus Publishing with Anthony Whyte as part of their Dream Team for several years and still edits The Cartier Street Review. She is a member of Poets & Writers and is listed at their site. Leftow has also worked on several other magazines. She has two books published and one chapbook and has been published in over 300 journals to date.

== Personal life ==
Leftow lives in Inwood, a little further north in Manhattan than Washington Heights.

== Writings ==
Leftow's second book Tupelo Honey (Aquillrelle Press 2017) was published as the result of winning third place in a poetry publication contest out of 268 submissions.

Leftow's first book, A Spot of Bleach & Other Poems and Prose (Big Foot Press, 2005), was praised by the Aquarian East Coast Rocker as:

bringing a bold energetic humor to the matters of everyday life. Growing up in a not so “Leave It To Beaver” household, she reflects on her relationships with family members and friends with more sarcasm than you could find in a whole season of “Seinfeld.” Her prose is like a catchy tune, keeping the reader engaged within every line and pause, allowing her words and loud voice to linger around in your head. Her observations and analysis of human nature represent the cynicism with which we think but never have the guts to say out loud.

=== Poetry ===
- One More Pill To Help Me Chill So I Don't Kill Anyone
- Tupelo Honey
- In A Little Café 04/2013
- Asheville Poetry Review
- Poetry in Performance # 34, #35 (City College of New York)
- New Press Literary Quarterly
- Inner Joy chapbook1996
- Medicinal Purposes
- Grist on Line 1995
- Poetry Magazine of the Lower East Side
- A Spot of Bleach & Other Poems and Prose (Big Foot Press, 2005)
- Poetry Kite Anthology
- Soul Fountain
- RainTiger.com
- Wings Magazine
- Online Wings Magazine

=== Prose ===
- Menopause: (essay) Online Wings Magazine, Summer 2005
- Esmerelda's Gift: Spot Of Bleach, November 2005
- False Pride, short story in the anthology, Lipstick Diaries (Augustus Publishing, 2007)
