= Chris Vlasto =

American television news producer (born 1966)

Chris J. Vlasto
- Born: Chris J. Vlasto; October 27, 1966 (age 59); Manhattan, New York, U.S.
- Education: Choate Rosemary Hall
- Alma mater: University of Southern California
- Occupation: Television news producer
- Years active: 1989–present
- Employer: ABC News
- Spouse: Deirdre Michalopoulos (m. 1995)
- Children: 2
- Awards: Daytime Emmy Award; Gerald Loeb Award

Chris J. Vlasto (born October 27, 1966) is an American television news producer. He is senior executive producer of investigations at ABC News, and was previously executive producer of Good Morning America. Earlier, he was a senior producer at 20/20 and at ABC News's Law and Justice unit. He won a Daytime Emmy Award as a senior broadcast producer of Good Morning America. In 2019, he co-hosted the ABC News podcast The Investigation.

== Early life and education ==
Vlasto was born in Manhattan. He graduated from Choate Rosemary Hall in 1984 and received his undergraduate degree from the University of Southern California in 1988.

== Career ==
On January 21, 1998, Vlasto produced the reports by correspondent Jackie Judd which first broadcast the allegations about President Clinton's association with former White House intern Monica Lewinsky. Vlasto also produced the Diane Sawyer interview with Ken Starr and the Barbara Walters interview with Monica Lewinsky which was one of the most watched news interviews in television history.

Vlasto also covered the September 11, 2001 attacks on the World Trade Center, the Florida Recount, the Lewinsky scandal, Oklahoma City bombing, and the OJ Simpson Trial.

Jim McDougal, the real estate speculator whose mismanagement of the Whitewater land deal with his partners Bill Clinton and Hillary Clinton led to the Whitewater controversy of the 1990s, says of Vlasto in the book Arkansas Mischief by Boston Globe writer, Curtis Wilkie:

"Though Chris had the lean and hungry look of a young journalist, his manner was that of a scholar. I discovered that the man belonging to the gentle voice on the phone had the cunning of a con artist but the soul of a true friend"

In 2002, Details named Vlasto one of the 50 most powerful people in the United States under 37. Diane Sawyer said, "He is of the tradition of journalists you don't see any more. He has got a craggy integrity."

In 2011, Vlasto produced the first interview with Meagan Broussard, one of the women Anthony Weiner was sexting with, together with 20/20 anchor Chris Cuomo.

== Awards ==
Vlasto has won more than a dozen awards, including the Edward R. Murrow Award and the Joan Barone Award for his coverage of President Clinton.

He also won an Emmy Award and a Sigma Delta Chi Award for his coverage of the 9/11 terror attacks.

He was a 2003 Gerald Loeb Award winner for Television Short Form business journalism.

=== Emmy Awards ===
| Year | Category | Nominated work | Result |
|---|---|---|---|
| 2005 | Best Report in a News Magazine | Primetime Live ("Back from Iraq") | Nominated |
| 2005 | Outstanding Coverage of a Breaking News Story in a News Magazine | Primetime Live ("Tsunami: Wave of Destruction") | Nominated |
| 2005 | Outstanding Investigative Journalism in a News Magazine | Primetime Live ("Non-Profit Hospital Litigation") | Nominated |
| 2007 | Excellence in Morning Programming | Good Morning America | Won |
| 2010 | Outstanding Coverage of a Breaking News Story in a Regularly Scheduled Newscast | Good Morning America ("Pittsburgh Gym Shooting") | Nominated |
| 2012 | Outstanding Interview | 20/20 ("Jaycee Dugard: Her First Interview") | Nominated |
| 2019 | Outstanding Morning Program | Good Morning America | Nominated |
| 2019 | Outstanding Coverage of a Breaking News Story in a Newscast | World News Tonight / Nightline ("Crisis at the Border") | Nominated |
| 2021 | Outstanding Continuing Coverage of a News Story in a News Magazine | 20/20 (episode #43.32) | Nominated |

== Personal life ==
Vlasto lives in Rye, New York, with his wife, Deirdre Michalopoulos, and their two sons.

His father, James Vlasto, was press secretary to New York Governor Hugh Carey. His half-brother, Josh Vlasto, was deputy communications director to Governor Andrew Cuomo. He is the grandson of Solon G. Vlasto, publisher of the Atlantis, a Greek-language daily newspaper in the United States. Atlantis was founded in 1894 by Solon G. Vlasto's uncle, Solon J. Vlasto, who also founded the Holy Trinity Greek Orthodox church in New York City in 1892.
