= Victor Norris Hamilton =

American cryptologist and defector

Victor Norris Hamilton (July 15, 1919 – November 11, 1997) was an American cryptologist who defected to the Soviet Union in 1963. He was discovered in a mental hospital in Russia in 1992, where he had been for 20 years.

== Early life ==
Hamilton was born as Fouzi Demitri Hindaly in Jaffa, in the British Mandate of Palestine, in July 1919. He graduated from the American University of Beirut, and married Lilly Bell Drake, an American, in Libya, who persuaded him to go to the United States. By his own account, he became a naturalized U.S. citizen, and was licensed as a teacher in Georgia but was denied work because he was an Arab. He worked as a doorman until a colonel recruited him to work for the National Security Agency (NSA).

Hamilton secured employment with the NSA in 1957, and worked there for two years in the "A.L.L.O." (all other countries) unit, assigned to study and break coded communications of Middle Eastern governments, including (but not limited to) those involving the Soviet Union. He suffered a nervous breakdown in February 1959, but was kept on at the NSA as it had few employees competent in Arabic. He was discharged in June 1959 for mental health reasons. He later claimed that he faked the symptoms so he could be allowed to leave the agency.

== Defection ==
In 1963, Hamilton defected to the Soviet Union. In July, Izvestia published an account by Hamilton of his work at the NSA.

== Mental illness and later life ==
Hamilton was confined for schizophrenia in the USSR, initially at a Kremlin hospital for high officials. In 1971, he was transferred to Special Psychiatric Hospital No. 5 in Troitskoye, about 30 miles south of Moscow. He was rediscovered there in 1992 by the Ark Project, which sought U.S. POWs who might be in Soviet hands once the USSR fell. Hamilton was convinced that the Pentagon was communicating with him through the radio, then later through his television set. When they learned of his whereabouts in 1992 his wife and children, surprised to learn he was still alive, stated that they would seek his repatriation. Hamilton died in November 1997 at the age of 78.
