= Ark Project =

The Ark Project or Ark Project of Freedom was an organisation co-founded by Susan Mesinai in March 1991 in Waterbury, Connecticut, to find out information on non-Russians taken prisoner by the former Soviet Union. These have included Raoul Wallenberg, American military POWs and others. Mesinai was a former program director of The Raoul Wallenberg Committee of the United States.

While searching for American POWs, the group discovered Victor Norris Hamilton in 1992.
