= Schedule of the 2004 Democratic National Convention =

The 2004 Democratic National Convention featured a variety of speakers, ranging from former presidents to rising newcomers.

== Monday, July 26th ==
=== Principal speakers ===
Name	Position/Notability
Bill Clinton	42nd President of the United States (1993–2001)
Jimmy Carter	39th President of the United States (1977–1981)
Al Gore	45th Vice President of the United States (1993–2001) 2000 Democratic presidential nominee
Hillary Clinton (Note: Clinton would go on to run two future campaigns for president, first being in 2008 where she would lose to then-Senator Barack Obama from Illinois. Second and final time was in 2016, when she won the nomination and selected Senator Tim Kaine from Virginia as her running mate. Clinton would go on to lose the 2016 election against then-businessman Donald Trump of New York, losing by an electoral vote margin of 306-227. Trump would go on to lose in 2020 against then-former Vice President Joe Biden of Delaware by a margin of 306-227, but gain the presidency for a second nonconsecutive term after winning the 2024 election against Vice President Kamala Harris of California by a margin of 312-226)	U.S. Senator from New York (2001–2009) Former First Lady of the United States (1993–2001) Wife of Bill Clinton

=== Featured speakers ===
Name	Position/Notability
Roberta Achtenberg	Assistant Secretary of Housing and Urban Development (1993–1995) Senior Advisor to the Secretary of Housing and Urban Development (1995–1997)
Tammy Baldwin	U.S. Congresswoman from WI-02 (1999–2013)
Rosa DeLauro	U.S. Congresswoman from CT-03 (1991–present)
Shirley Franklin	58th Mayor of Atlanta (2002–2010)
Terry McAuliffe	Chairman of the Democratic National Committee (2001–2005)
Greg Meeks	U.S. Congressman from New York (1998–present)
Bob Menendez	U.S. Congressman from NJ-13 (1993–2006)
Lottie Shackelford	Vice Chair of the 2004 Democratic National Convention 68th Mayor of Little Rock, Arkansas (1987–1988)
Stephanie T. Jones	U.S. Congresswoman from OH-11 (1999–2008)
Tom Vilsack	40th Governor of Iowa (1999–2007)

=== Quotes ===
- "Democrats and Republicans have very different and honestly held ideas on that choices we should make, rooted in fundamentally different views of how we should meet our common challenges at home and how we should play our role in the world. Democrats want to build an America of shared responsibilities and shared opportunities and more global cooperation, acting alone only when we must. We think the role of government is to give people the tools and conditions to make the most of their lives. Republicans believe in an America run by the right people, their people, in a world in which we act unilaterally when we can, and cooperate when we have to. They think the role of government is to concentrate wealth and power in the hands of those who embrace their political, economic, and social views, leaving ordinary citizens to fend for themselves on matters like health care and retirement security. Since most Americans are not that far to the right, they have to portray us Democrats as unacceptable, lacking in strength and values. In other words, they need a divided America—but we don't." —Bill Clinton
- "Strength and wisdom are not opposing values."—Bill Clinton
- "And so I say to you and to others around the world, whether they wish us well or ill — do not underestimate us Americans. We lack neither strength nor wisdom." —Jimmy Carter
- "I'll be candid with you. I had hoped to be back here this week under different circumstances, running for reelection. But you know the old saying — you win some, you lose some. And then there's that little-known third category." —Al Gore
- "Take it from me — every vote counts. In our Democracy, every vote has power. And never forget — that power is yours. Don't let anyone take it away or talk you into throwing it away. And let's make sure that this time every vote is counted." —Al Gore

== Tuesday, July 27th ==
=== Principal speakers ===
Name	Position/Notability
Teresa Heinz Kerry	Wife of John Kerry
Christopher Heinz	Stepson of John Kerry
Barack Obama (Note: Would go on to win the Presidency in 2008 against Arizona U.S. Senator John McCain and in 2012 against (then) former Governor of Massachusetts Mitt Romney, serving as President from 2009-2017.)	State senator from Illinois' 13th district (1997–2004) 2004 Democratic nominee for U.S. Senate in Illinois

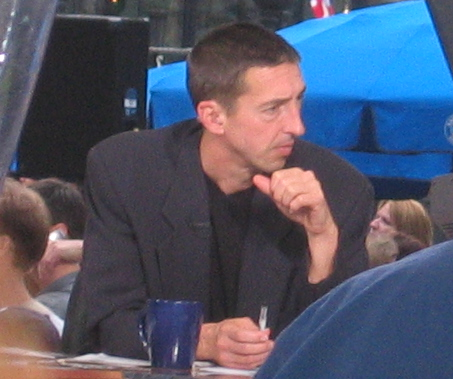
Ron Reagan being interviewed by MSNBC at the Quincy Market during the DNC

=== Featured speakers ===
Name	Position/Notability
Carol Moseley Braun	14th U.S. Ambassador to Samoa (2000–2001) 14th U.S. Ambassador to New Zealand (1999–2001) U.S. Senator from Illinois (1993–1999)
Robert Caro	Two-time Pulitzer Prize winning author and historian
Tom Carper	U.S. Senator from Delaware (2001–2025)
Jon Corzine	U.S. Senator from New Jersey (2001–2006) (Note: Would run for Governor in 2005 and would go on to serve as the 54th Governor of New Jersey from January 17, 2006 to January 19, 2010.)
Tom Daschle	Senate Majority Leader (2001–2003; 2001) Senate Minority Leader (2003–2005; 2001; 1995–2001) Chair of the Senate Democratic Caucus (1995–2005) U.S. Senator from South Dakota (1987–2005)
Howard Dean	79th Governor of Vermont (1991–2003) 2004 Democratic presidential candidate
John Dingell	U.S. Congressman of Michigan (1955–2015)
Dick Gephardt	House Majority Leader (1995–2005) U.S. Congressman of MO-03 (1977–2005) 2004 Democratic presidential candidate 1988 Democratic presidential candidate
James P. Hoffa	President of the International Brotherhood of Teamsters (1998–2022)
Mike Honda	U.S. Congressman from California (2001–2017)
Jesse Jackson	U.S. Shadow Senator from the District of Columbia (1991–1997) 1984 and 1988 Democratic presidential candidate
Ted Kennedy	U.S. Senator from Massachusetts (1963–2009)
Kwame Kilpatrick	68th Mayor of Detroit (2002–2008)
Bob Matsui	U.S. Congressman from California (1979–2005)
Ben McKenzie	Actor and commentator (2002–present) Political activist
Janet Napolitano	21st Governor of Arizona (2003–2009)
Ron Reagan	Son of 40th President of the United States Ronald Reagan
Linda Sánchez	U.S. Congresswoman from California (2003–present)
Christie Vilsack	First Lady of Iowa (1999–2007) Wife of Tom Vilsack

=== Quotes ===
- "I’ve seen their desire to take our country back for the American people. I saw it in a college student in Pennsylvania who sold her bicycle and sent us a check for one hundred dollars with a note that said, "I sold my bicycle for democracy." I saw it in a woman from Iowa who handed me fifty dollars — all in quarters. She saved it from her monthly disability check, because she wanted to make America well again. And I saw it in the 19-year-old from Alabama who had never been involved in politics before he got in his car and drove up to Vermont, because he didn't feel like he was being heard in Washington. He was just one of so many. They learned that politics was too important to be left to the politicians. They didn't just pack their bags—they backed their hopes that we can take our country back. And you know what? We will." —Howard Dean
- "Words can be cheap in a political year, we all know that. But I'm going to borrow some familiar ones, to tell you that we need John Kerry as president — because we need a uniter, not a divider, in the White House. We need John Kerry as president because it's time to restore honor and dignity to the White House — to have a president whose whole life is a testament to his goodness and decency, to his courage under fire. We need John Kerry as president of the United States of America, because he will fight for working families, and help America to be what it ought to be." —Richard Gephardt
- "Today, more than two centuries after the embattled farmers stood and fired the shot heard "round the world", the ideals of our founders still resonate across the globe. Young people in other lands — inspired by the liberty we cherish — linked arms and sang "We Shall Overcome" when the Berlin Wall fell, when apartheid ended in South Africa, and when the courageous protests took place in Tiananmen Square. The goals of the American people are every bit as high as they were more than two hundred years ago. If America is failing to reach them today, it's not because our ideals need replacing, it's because our President needs replacing." —Edward M. Kennedy
- "I learned something then, and I believe it still. There is a value in taking a stand whether or not anyone may be noticing and whether or not it is a risky thing to do. And if even those who are in danger can raise their lonely voices, isn't more required of all of us, in this land where liberty had her birth? In America, the true patriots are those who dare speak truth to power." —Teresa Heinz Kerry
- "I was elected mayor at age 31 because I dared mighty things for the citizens of my city." —Kwame Kilpatrick
- A twelve-year-old founder of Kidsforkerry. Org addressed the delegates. She scolded Dick Cheney for his use of an expletive in a public remark to U.S. Senator Patrick Leahy. "When our vice president had a disagreement with a Democratic senator, he used a really bad word. If I said that word, I would be put in a timeout. I think he should be put in a timeout." —Ilana Wexler

== Wednesday, July 28th ==
=== Principal speakers ===
Name	Position/Notability
John Edwards	U.S. Senator from North Carolina (1999–2005) 2004 Democratic presidential candidate 2004 Democratic vice presidential nominee (Note: Would run for the Democratic nomination for a second time in 2008, but would come in third behind Hillary Clinton and Barack Obama who had also spoken on day one and day two of the convention)
Elizabeth Edwards	Wife of John Edwards (1977–2010)
Cate Edwards	Daughter of John Edwards

=== Featured speakers ===
Name	Position/Notability
Steve Brozak	Businessman Retired Marine Lieutenant Colonel 2004 Democratic nominee for NJ-07
Elijah Cummings	U.S. Congressman from MD-07 (1996–2019)
Harold Ford Jr.	U.S. Congressman from TN-09 (1997–2007)
John Glenn	U.S. Senator from Ohio (1975–1999) 1984 Democratic presidential candidate NASA Astronaut (1959–1964)
Bob Graham	U.S. Senator from Florida (1987–2005) 38th Governor of Florida (1979–1987)
Jennifer Granholm	47th Governor of Michigan (2003–2011)
Cheryl Jacques	State Senator for Massachusetts Senate's Norfolk, Bristol and Middlesex district (1993–2004) President of Human Rights Campaign (2004)
Claudia J. Kennedy	First female Lieutenant General in the United States Army (1969–2000)
Dennis Kucinich	U.S. Congressman from OH-04 (1997–2013) 2004 Democratic presidential candidate
Ed Pastor	U.S. Congressman from Arizona (1991–2015)
Bill Richardson	30th Governor of New Mexico (2003–2011) 9th United States Secretary of Energy (1998–2001) 21st United States Ambassador to the United Nations (1997–1998) Chairman of the 2004 Democratic National Convention
Al Sharpton	Reverend

- Cheryl Jacques, President of Human Rights Campaign
- Claudia J. Kennedy, first female Lieutenant General in the United States Army
- Dennis Kucinich, United States Representative from Ohio
- Ed Pastor, United States Representative from Arizona
- Bill Richardson, Chairman of the 2004 Democratic National Convention and Governor of New Mexico
- Al Sharpton, Former Democratic presidential candidate

=== Quotes ===
- "My fellow Americans, I don't need to tell you that the world is a dangerous place. We are reminded of that in our everyday lives — and we have seen it on the streets and in the subways and airports outside this convention. Al Qaeda is the heir to enemies we have defeated before — today's equivalent of Nazis and fascists who hate the values at the core of the American way of life: democracy and pluralism, diversity and tolerance, innovation and achievement, strength and freedom. And the fate of Al Qaeda will be the same as those other tyrants and thugs—we will defeat them." —Bill Richardson
- "This is not about a party. It is about living up to the promise of America. The promise of America says that we will guarantee quality education for all children, and not spend more for metal detectors than computers in our schools. The promise of America guarantees health care for all of its citizens, and does not force seniors to travel to Canada to buy prescription drugs they cannot afford here. The promise of America provides that those who work in our health care system can afford to be hospitalized in the very beds that they clean everyday. The promise of America is government that does not seek to regulate your behavior in the bedroom but to guarantee your right to provide food in the kitchen. The promise of America is that we stand for human rights – whether it's fighting slavery in Sudan, AIDS in Lesotho, or police brutality in this country. The promise of America is one immigration policy for all who seek to enter our shores, whether they come from Mexico, Haiti, or Canada. The promise of America is that every citizen's vote is counted and protected, and election schemes do not decide elections." —Al Sharpton
- "As I ran for president, I hoped that one child would come out of the ghetto like I did, could look at me walk across the stage with governors and senators and know they didn't have to be a drug dealer, they didn't have to be a hoodlum, they didn't have to be a gangster. They could stand up from a broken home, on welfare, and they could run for president of the United States." —Al Sharpton
- "There is not a liberal America, and a conservative America. There is the United States of America. There is not a black America, and a white America, a Latino America, an Asian America. There is the United States of America." —Barack Obama

== Thursday, July 29th ==
=== Principal speakers ===
- John Kerry, 2004 Democratic presidential candidate
- Alexandra Kerry, Daughter of John Kerry
- Vanessa Kerry, Daughter of John Kerry

=== Featured speakers ===
- Juanita Millender-McDonald, United States Representative from California
- Joe Biden, United States Senator from Delaware (Note: Failed 2008 presidential campaign, but became Vice President from 2009 to 2017. He went on to successfully run in 2020 and become President in 2021.)
- Wesley Clark, former NATO Supreme Allied Commander and 2004 presidential candidate
- Madeleine Albright, 64th United States Secretary of State
- Max Cleland, former United States Senator from Georgia
- Joe Lieberman, United States Senator from Connecticut, 2004 presidential candidate, and 2000 vice-presidential candidate. (Note: Left the Democratic Party, became an independent senator, and campaigned in 2008 for GOP presidential candidate John McCain against Barack Obama.)
- Nancy Pelosi, United States Representative from California and House Minority Leader (Note: Went on to become the Speaker of the House from 2007 to 2011, and then reelected Speaker of the House in 2019.)
- Byron Dorgan, United States Senator from North Dakota
- Mark Warner, Governor of Virginia

=== Quotes ===
- "During the course of this campaign, I've heard people talk about John Kerry the father and John Kerry the public servant as if they were two people divided. But, I can assure you all they are truly one and the same. I know his values-revealed in quiet 11 p.m. phone calls of frustration from what he's seen at work, or the simple reminder that we never turn our backs on those in need. What drives my father to serve is exactly what has made this public servant the father I'm proud of, look up to, and love." —Vanessa Kerry
- "To every little girl her father is a hero. It's taken some getting used to, that my father actually is one. And not just in the obvious ways. Because he likes to listen as much as he likes to talk; because he's studious in the way someone is when everything in the whole world interests them; because he leads by example; because he trusts people with the truth and doesn't pander or play to our baser instincts." —Alexandra Kerry
