= 2004 United States House of Representatives elections in New Jersey =

- November 2, 2004

All 13 New Jersey seats to the United States House of Representatives
- Turnout: 73% (▲27pp)
	Majority party	Minority party
Party	Democratic	Republican
Last election	7	6
Seats won	7	6
Seat change	Steady	Steady
Popular vote	1,721,392	1,514,784
Percentage	52.41%	46.12%
Swing	▲1.06%	▼0.43%

Democratic hold
Republican hold
Democratic
40–50%
50–60%
60–70%
70–80%
90–100%
Republican
50–60%
60–70%
70–80%

The 2004 United States House of Representatives elections in New Jersey were held on November 2, 2004, to determine who would represent the people of New Jersey in the United States House of Representatives. This election coincided with national elections for U.S. President, and the U.S. House and U.S. Senate. There was no concurrent election for Senator or Governor in the state. New Jersey has thirteen seats in the House, apportioned according to the 2000 United States census. Representatives are elected for two-year terms.

== Overview ==
United States House of Representatives elections in New Jersey, 2004
Party	Votes	Percentage	Seats	+/–
Democratic	1,721,392	52.41%	7	Steady
Republican	1,514,784	46.12%	6	Steady
Libertarian	16,379	0.50%	0	Steady
Green	10,033	0.31%	0	Steady
Independents	22,007	0.67%	0	Steady
Totals	3,284,595	100.00%	13	—

== District 1 ==
2004 New Jersey's 1st congressional district election
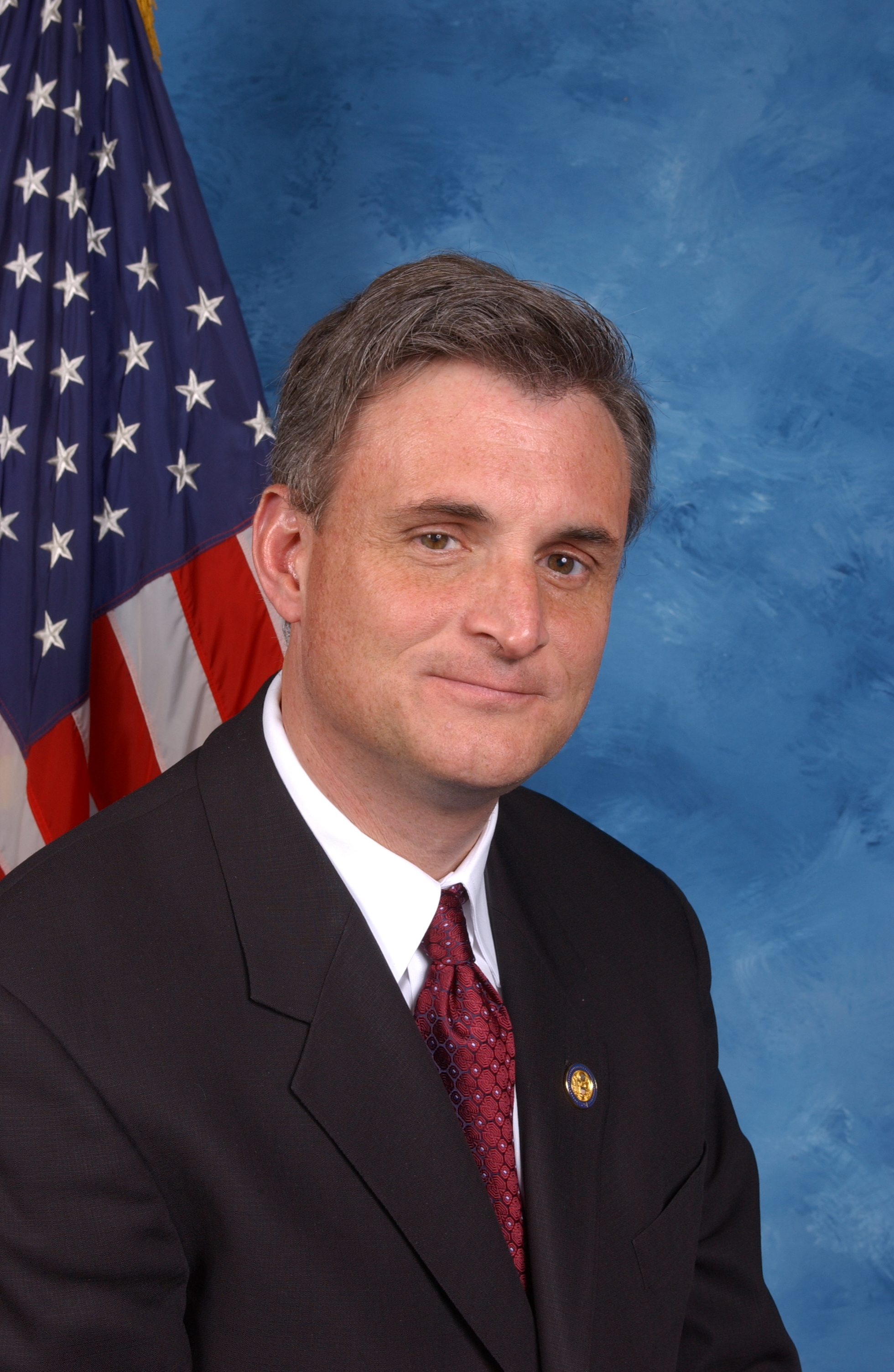

Nominee	Rob Andrews	Dan Hutchison
Party	Democratic	Republican
Popular vote	201,163	66,109
Percentage	75.0%	24.6%
- County results Andrews: 70–80%
U.S. Representative before election
Rob Andrews
Democratic
Elected U.S. Representative
incumbent
Democratic

Incumbent Democrat Rob Andrews won. This district covers Camden County. Shortly after losing the election, Hutchison switched parties and became a member of the Democratic Party. He was later elected to the Gloucester Township Committee and New Jersey General Assembly in 2023.

=== General election ===
==== Candidates ====
- Rob Andrews, incumbent Representative from Haddon Heights since 1990 (Democratic)
- Arturo Croce (Independent)
- Dan Hutchison, Gloucester Township attorney (Republican)

==== Predictions ====
Source	Ranking	As of
The Cook Political Report	Safe D	October 29, 2004
Sabato's Crystal Ball	Safe D	November 1, 2004

==== Results ====
New Jersey's 1st congressional district election, 2004
Party	Candidate	Votes	%
Democratic	Rob Andrews (incumbent)	201,163	75.00%
Republican	Dan Hutchison	66,109	24.65%
Independent	Arturo Croce	931	0.35%
Majority		135,054	50.36%
Turnout		268,203	
Democratic hold			

== District 2 ==
2004 New Jersey's 2nd congressional district election
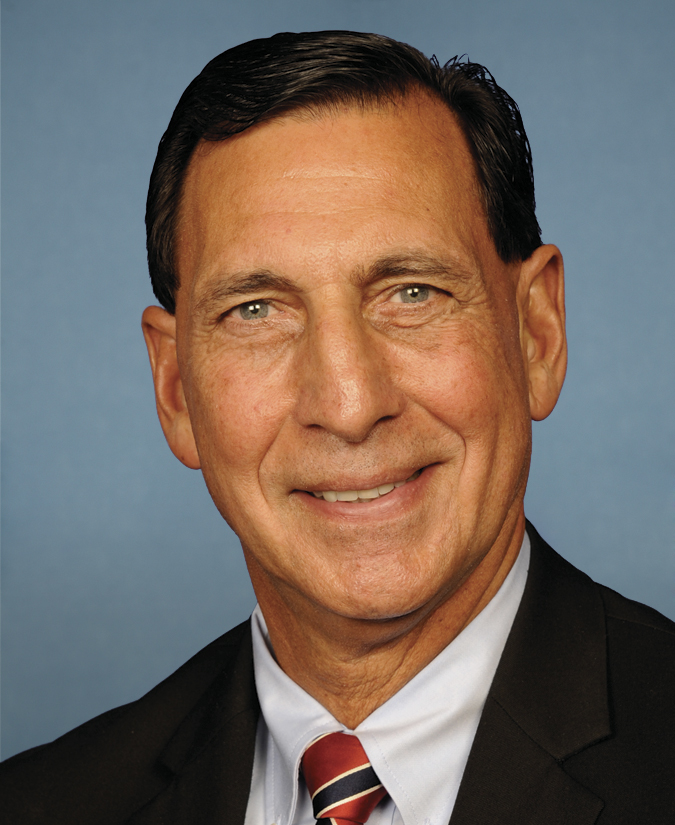

Nominee	Frank LoBiondo	Timothy Robb
Party	Republican	Democratic
Popular vote	172,779	86,792
Percentage	65.1%	32.7%
- County results LoBiondo: 50–60% 60–70% 70–80%
U.S. Representative before election
Frank LoBiondo
Republican
Elected U.S. Representative
incumbent
Republican

Incumbent Republican Frank A. LoBiondo defeated Democrat Timothy Robb. This district covers the southern part of the state.

=== General election ===
==== Candidates ====
- Jose Alcantara (Green)
- Frank LoBiondo, incumbent Representative from Millville since 1995 (Republican)
- Michael Matthews Jr. (Libertarian)
- Willie Norwood (Independent)
- Timothy Robb (Democratic)
- Constantino Rozzo (Independent)

==== Predictions ====
Source	Ranking	As of
The Cook Political Report	Safe R	October 29, 2004
Sabato's Crystal Ball	Safe R	November 1, 2004

==== Results ====
New Jersey's 2nd congressional district election, 2004
Party	Candidate	Votes	%
Republican	Frank LoBiondo (incumbent)	172,779	65.09%
Democratic	Timothy Robb	86,792	32.70%
Independent	Willie Norwood	1,993	0.75%
Libertarian	Michael Matthews Jr.	1,767	0.67%
Green	Jose Alcantara	1,516	0.57%
Independent	Constantino Rozzo	595	0.22%
Majority		85,987	32.39%
Turnout		265,442	
Republican hold			

== District 3 ==
2004 New Jersey's 3rd congressional district election
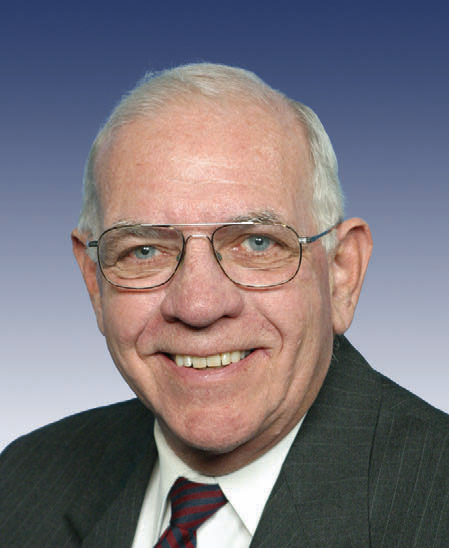

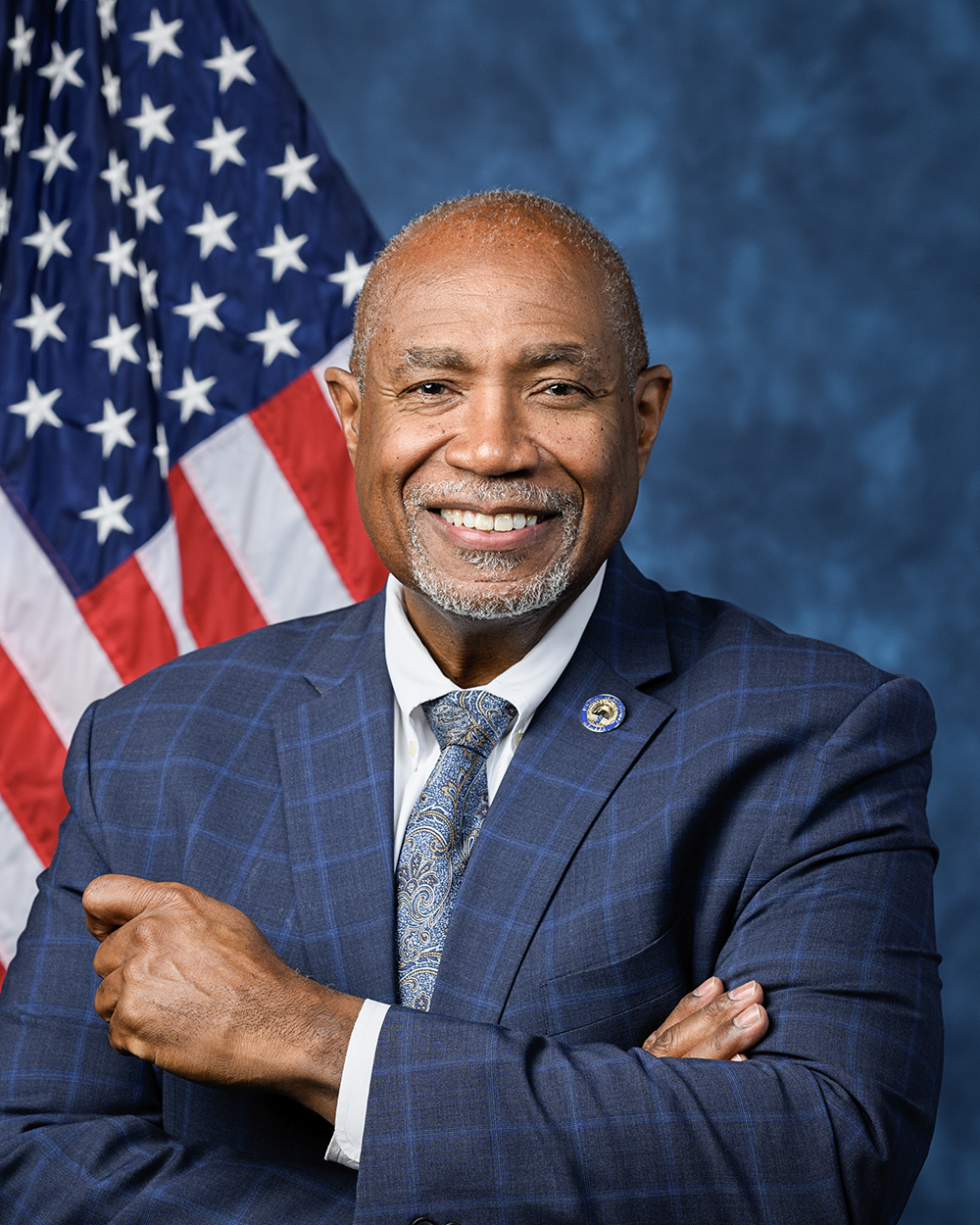
Nominee	Jim Saxton	Herb Conaway
Party	Republican	Democratic
Popular vote	195,938	107,034
Percentage	63.4%	34.6%
- County results Saxton: 50–60% 60–70%
U.S. Representative before election
Jim Saxton
Republican
Elected U.S. Representative
incumbent
Republican

Incumbent Republican Jim Saxton defeated Democratic State Assemblyman Herb Conaway. The district covers Burlington and Ocean counties. Twenty years later in 2024, Conaway would be elected to represent the district.

=== General election ===
==== Candidates ====
- Herb Conaway, physician and Assemblyman from Delanco (Democratic)
- Ed Forchion, marijuana legalization activist (Independent)
- Frank Orland (Libertarian)
- Jim Saxton, incumbent Representative from Mount Holly since 1984 (Republican)

==== Predictions ====
Source	Ranking	As of
The Cook Political Report	Safe R	October 29, 2004
Sabato's Crystal Ball	Safe R	November 1, 2004

==== Results ====
New Jersey's 3rd congressional district election, 2004
Party	Candidate	Votes	%
Republican	Jim Saxton (incumbent)	195,938	63.44%
Democratic	Herb Conaway	107,034	34.65%
Independent	Edward Forchion	4,914	1.59%
Libertarian	Frank Orland	976	0.32%
Majority		88,904	28.78%
Turnout		308,862	
Republican hold			

== District 4 ==
2004 New Jersey's 4th congressional district election
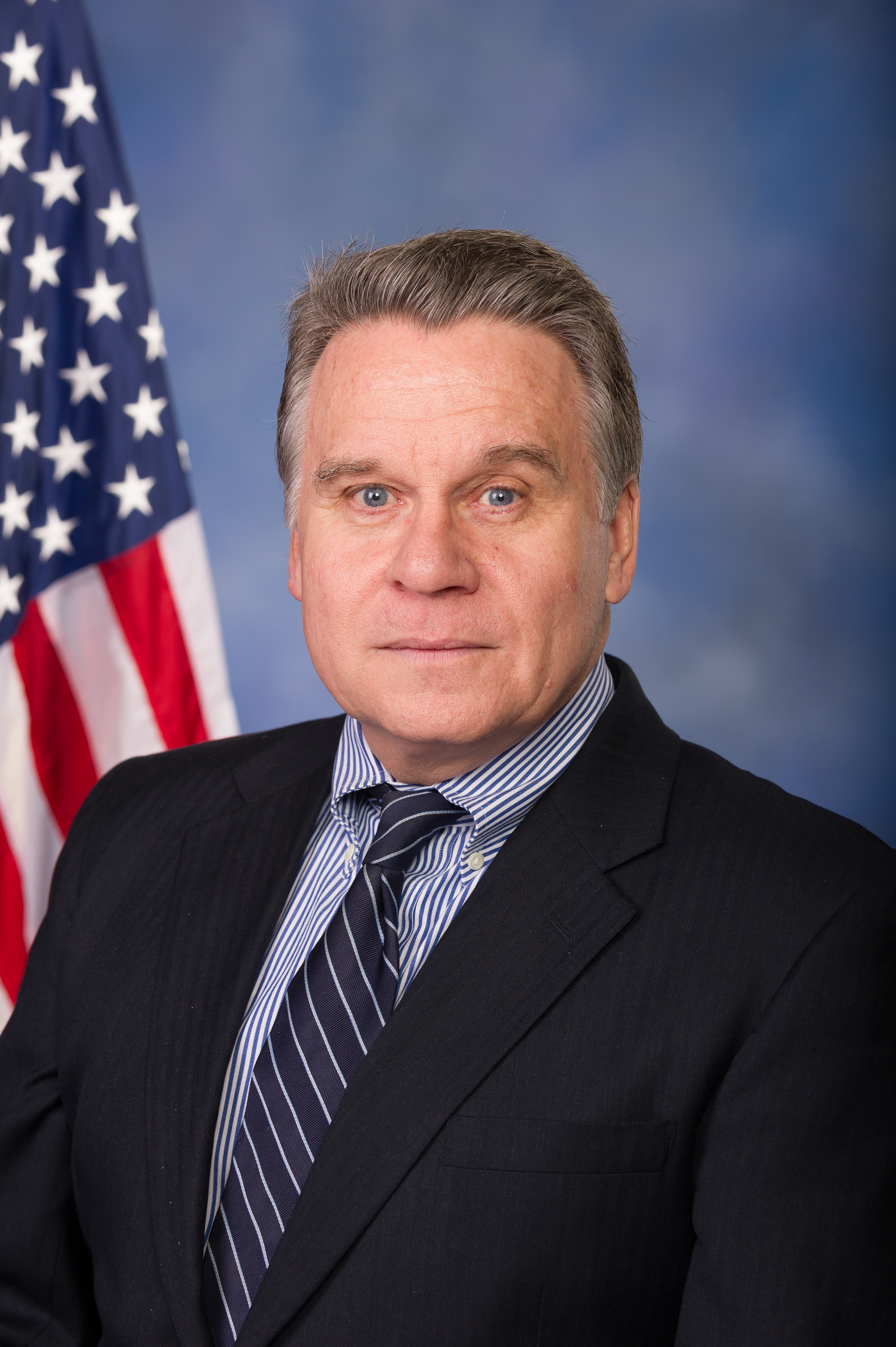

Nominee	Chris Smith	Amy Vasquez
Party	Republican	Democratic
Popular vote	192,671	92,826
Percentage	67.0%	32.3%
- County results Smith: 60–70%
U.S. Representative before election
Chris Smith
Republican
Elected U.S. Representative
incumbent
Republican

Incumbent Republican Chris Smith defeated Democrat Amy Vasquez. This district covers 4 counties in the central part of the state.

=== General election ===
==== Candidates ====
- Richard Edgar (Libertarian)
- Chris Smith, incumbent Representative since 1981 (Republican)
- Amy Vasquez, child advocate attorney (Democratic)

==== Predictions ====
Source	Ranking	As of
The Cook Political Report	Safe R	October 29, 2004
Sabato's Crystal Ball	Safe R	November 1, 2004

==== Results ====
New Jersey's 4th congressional district election, 2004
Party	Candidate	Votes	%
Republican	Chris Smith (incumbent)	192,671	67.00%
Democratic	Amy Vasquez	92,826	32.28%
Libertarian	Richard Edgar	2,056	0.71%
Majority		99,845	34.72%
Turnout		287,553	
Republican hold			

== District 5 ==
2004 New Jersey's 5th congressional district election
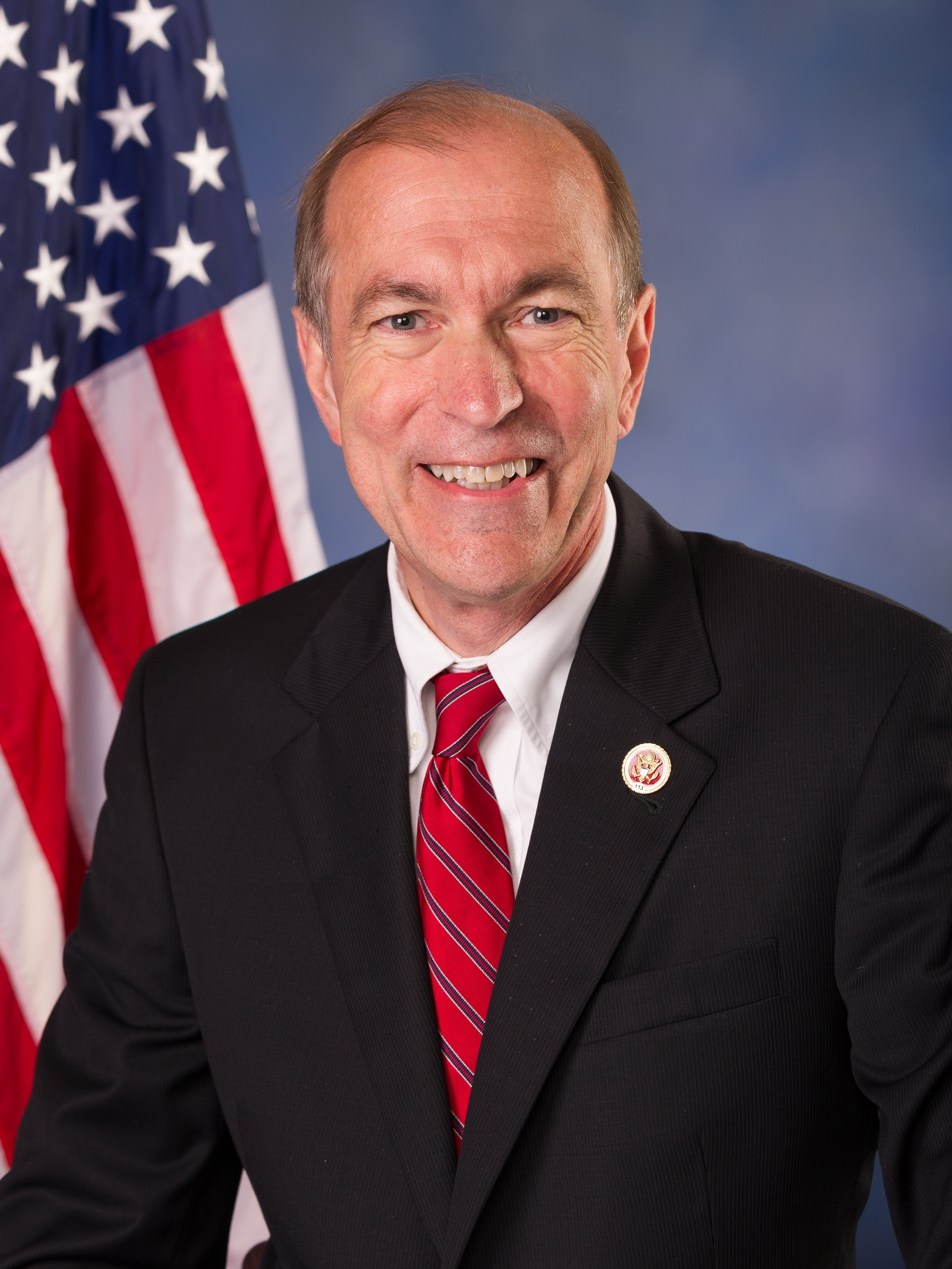

Nominee	Scott Garrett	Dorothea Anne Wolfe
Party	Republican	Democratic
Popular vote	171,220	122,259
Percentage	57.6%	41.1%
- County results Garrett: 50–60% 60–70%
U.S. Representative before election
Scott Garrett
Republican
Elected U.S. Representative
incumbent
Republican

Incumbent Republican Scott Garrett defeated Democrat Dorothea Anne Wolfe. This district covers the northern border of the state.

=== Democratic primary ===
==== Candidates ====
- Frank Fracasso, businessman
- Dorothea Anne Wolfe, chair of the Bergen County Improvement Association

==== Endorsements ====
Anne Wolfe

U.S. Senators

- Jon Corzine, U.S. Senator from New Jersey

County party organizations

- Bergen County Democratic Organization
- Passaic County Democratic Organization
- Warren County Democratic Organization

=== General election ===
==== Candidates ====
- Scott Garrett, incumbent Representative from Wantage since 2003 (Republican)
- Victor Kaplan (Libertarian)
- Gregory Pason (Independent)
- Thomas Phelan (Independent)
- Dorothea Anne Wolfe, chair of the Bergen County Improvement Association (Democratic)

==== Predictions ====
Source	Ranking	As of
The Cook Political Report	Safe R	October 29, 2004
Sabato's Crystal Ball	Safe R	November 1, 2004

==== Results ====
New Jersey's 5th congressional district election, 2004
Party	Candidate	Votes	%
Republican	Scott Garrett (incumbent)	171,220	57.57%
Democratic	Dorothea Anne Wolfe	122,259	41.11%
Libertarian	Victor Kaplan	1,857	0.62%
Independent	Thomas Phelan	1,515	0.51%
Independent	Gregory Pason	574	0.19%
Majority		48,961	16.46%
Turnout		297,425	
Republican hold			

== District 6 ==
2004 New Jersey's 6th congressional district election
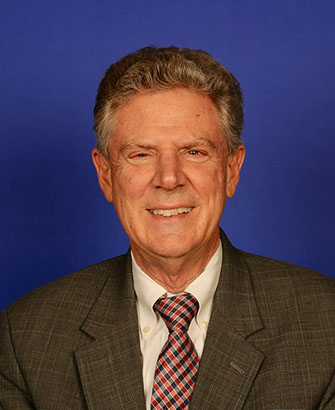

Nominee	Frank Pallone Jr.	Sylvester Fernandez
Party	Democratic	Republican
Popular vote	153,981	70,942
Percentage	66.9%	30.8%
- County results Pallone: 60–70% 70–80% 80–90%
U.S. Representative before election
Frank Pallone Jr.
Democratic
Elected U.S. Representative
incumbent
Democratic

Incumbent Democrat Frank Pallone defeated Republican challenger Sylvester Fernandez. Between 2003 and 2013, this district covered parts of Monmouth, Middlesex, Somerset, and Union counties.

=== General election ===
==== Candidates ====
- Sylvester Fernandez (Republican)
- Virginia Flynn (Libertarian)
- Mac Dara Lyden (Independent)
- Frank Pallone, incumbent Representative from Long Branch since 1988 (Democratic)

==== Predictions ====
Source	Ranking	As of
The Cook Political Report	Safe D	October 29, 2004
Sabato's Crystal Ball	Safe D	November 1, 2004

==== Results ====
New Jersey's 6th congressional district election, 2004
Party	Candidate	Votes	%
Democratic	Frank Pallone Jr. (incumbent)	153,981	66.90%
Republican	Sylvester Fernandez	70,942	30.82%
Libertarian	Virginia Flynn	2,829	1.23%
Independent	Mac Dara Lyden	2,399	1.04%
Majority		83,039	36.08%
Turnout		230,151	
Democratic hold			

== District 7 ==
2004 New Jersey's 7th congressional district election
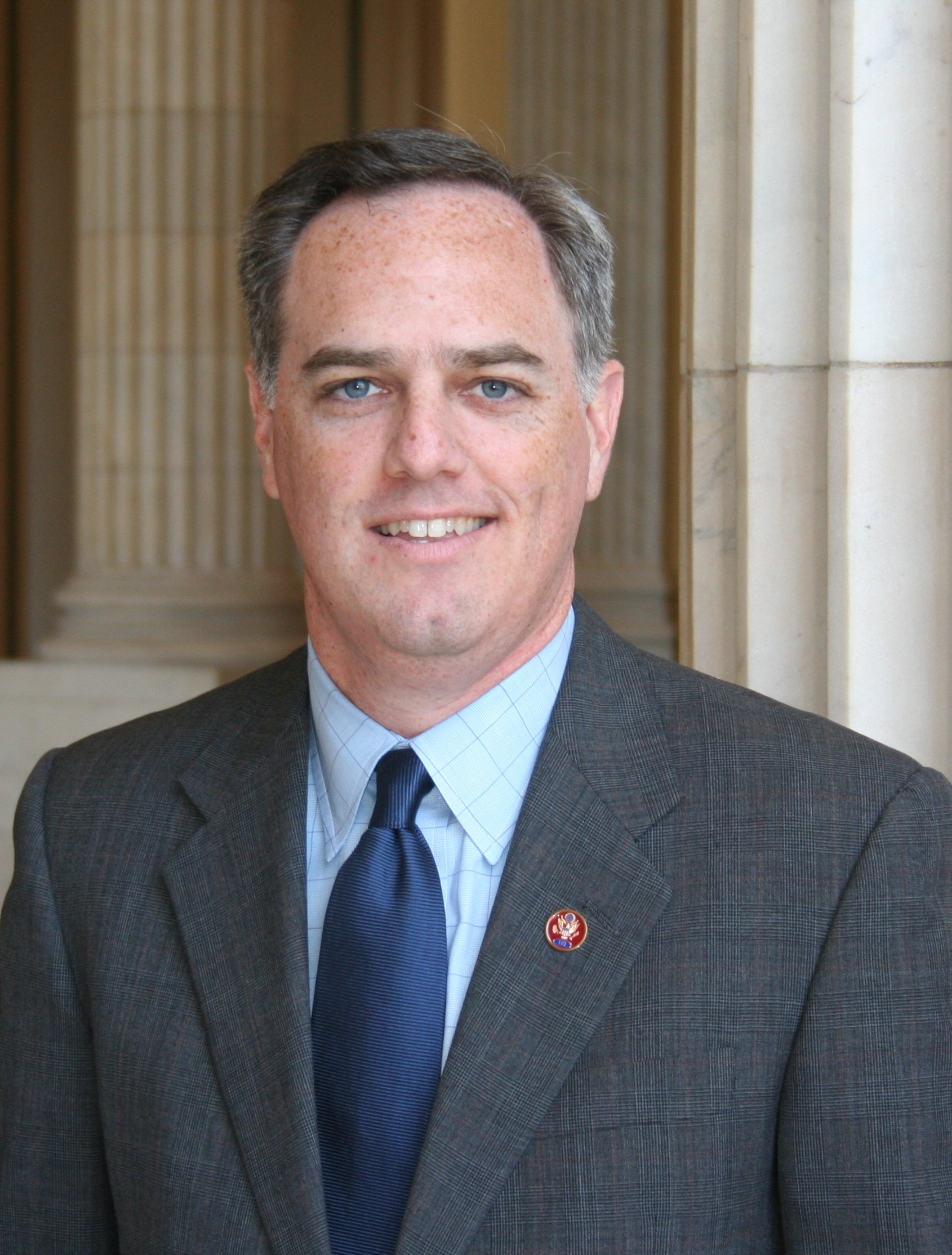

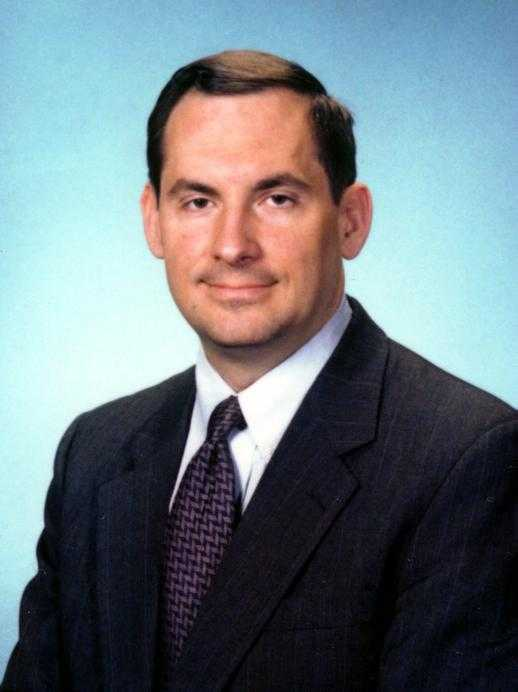
Nominee	Mike Ferguson	Steve Brozak
Party	Republican	Democratic
Popular vote	162,597	119,081
Percentage	56.9%	41.7%
- County results Ferguson: 50–60% 60–70% Brozak: 50–60%
U.S. Representative before election
Mike Ferguson
Republican
Elected U.S. Representative
incumbent
Republican

Incumbent Republican Mike Ferguson defeated Democrat Steve Brozak. Between 2003 and 2013, this district covered parts of Middlesex, Union, Somerset, and Hunterdon counties.

=== General election ===
==== Candidates ====
- Thomas Abrams (Libertarian)
- Steve Brozak, lieutenant colonel in the United States Marine Corps (Democratic)
- Mike Ferguson, incumbent Representative from Union since 2001 (Republican)
- Matthew Williams (Independent)

==== Campaign ====
Brozak, a former Republican who switched party lines to run, launched his campaign with a front-page story in The Wall Street Journal. He focused his message on the management of Operation Iraqi Freedom, warning that the shortage of U.S. troops presented an insurmountable obstacle to its mission and calling for a modified strategy to subdue insurgency and create a stable government in Iraq. Writing for Salon, Michelle Goldberg referred to his campaign as "a referendum on Bush's military folly". Brozak also called for deregulation of stem cell research and fair trade with foreign countries.

Brozak was a primetime speaker at the 2004 Democratic National Convention, where he criticized the Bush administration for its lack of planning in advance of the invasion of Iraq.

==== Predictions ====
Source	Ranking	As of
The Cook Political Report	Likely R	October 29, 2004
Sabato's Crystal Ball	Safe R	November 1, 2004

==== Results ====
New Jersey's 7th congressional district election, 2004
Party	Candidate	Votes	%
Republican	Mike Ferguson (incumbent)	162,597	56.88%
Democratic	Steve Brozak	119,081	41.66%
Libertarian	Thomas Abrams	2,153	0.75%
Independent	Matthew Williams	2,016	0.71%
Majority		43,516	15.22%
Turnout		285,847	
Republican hold			

== District 8 ==
2004 New Jersey's 8th congressional district election
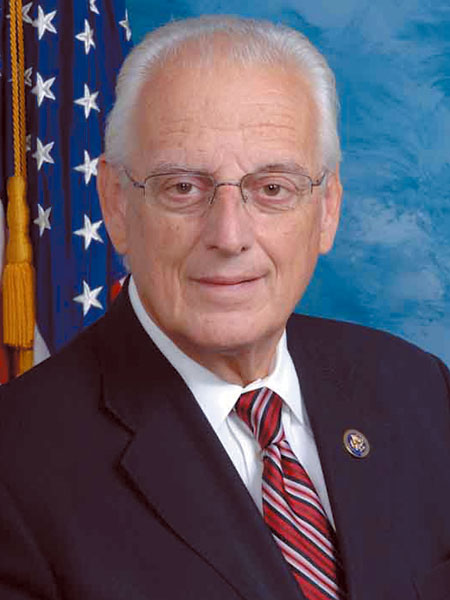

Nominee	Bill Pascrell Jr.	George Ajjan
Party	Democratic	Republican
Popular vote	152,001	62,747
Percentage	69.5%	28.7%
- County results Pascrell: 60–70% 70–80%
U.S. Representative before election
Bill Pascrell Jr.
Democratic
Elected U.S. Representative
incumbent
Democratic

Incumbent Democrat Bill Pascrell defeated Republican George Ajjan. This district covers Essex and Passaic counties.

=== General election ===
==== Candidates ====
- George Ajjan (Republican)
- Joseph Fortunato (Green)
- Bill Pascrell, incumbent Representative from Paterson since 1997 (Democratic)

==== Predictions ====
Source	Ranking	As of
The Cook Political Report	Safe D	October 29, 2004
Sabato's Crystal Ball	Safe D	November 1, 2004

==== Results ====
New Jersey's 8th congressional district election, 2004
Party	Candidate	Votes	%
Democratic	Bill Pascrell Jr. (incumbent)	152,001	69.46%
Republican	George Ajjan	62,747	28.68%
Green	Joseph Fortunato	4,072	1.86%
Majority		89,254	40.79%
Turnout		218,820	
Democratic hold			

== District 9 ==
2004 New Jersey's 9th congressional district election
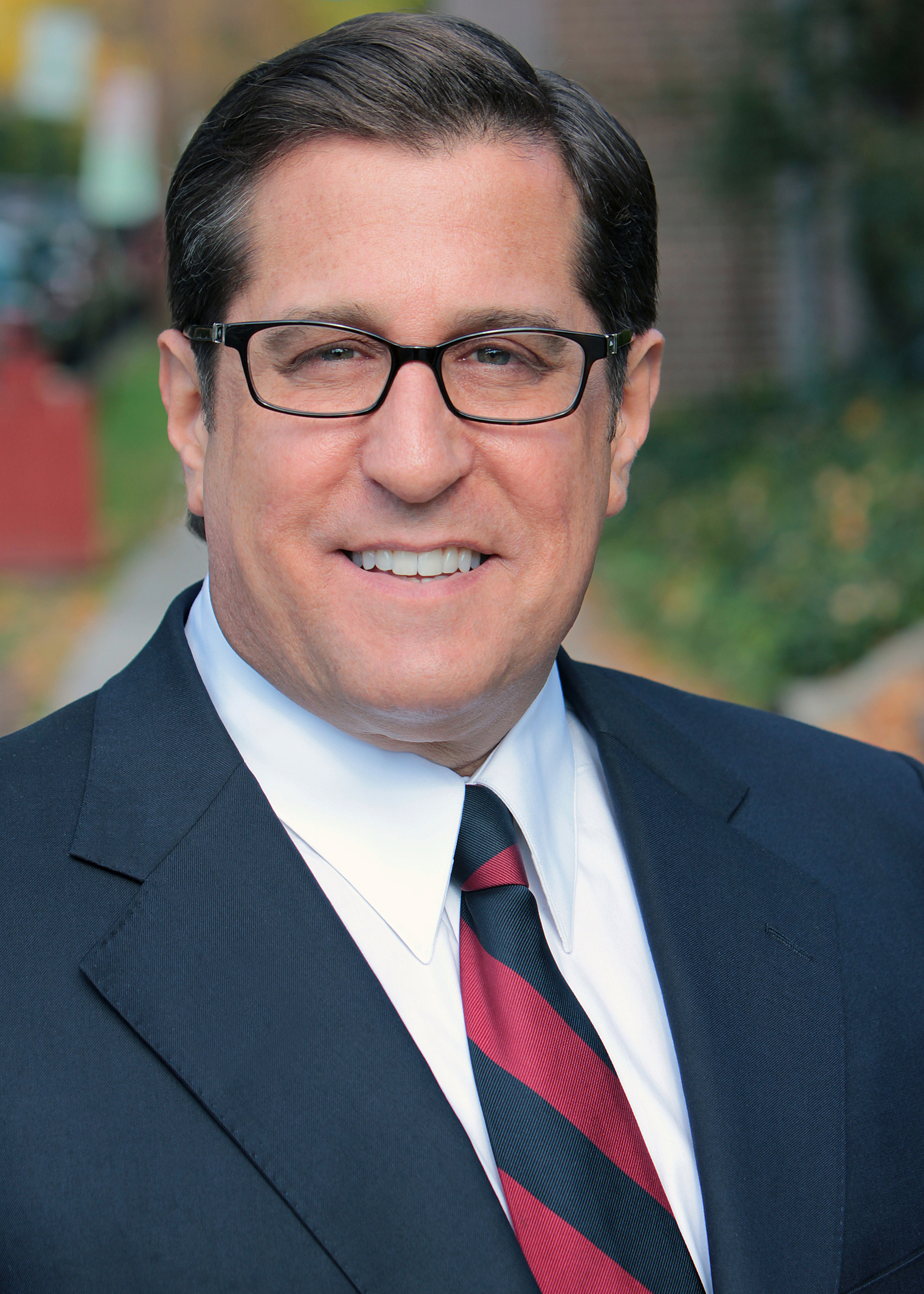

Nominee	Steve Rothman	Edward Trawinski
Party	Democratic	Republican
Popular vote	146,038	68,564
Percentage	67.5%	31.7%
- County results Rothman: 50–60% 60–70%
U.S. Representative before election
Steve Rothman
Democratic
Elected U.S. Representative
incumbent
Democratic

Incumbent Democrat Steve Rothman defeated Republican Edward Trawinski. This district covers mostly Bergen County.

=== General election ===
==== Candidates ====
- David Daly (Libertarian)
- Steve Rothman, incumbent Representative from Fair Lawn since 1997 (Democratic)
- Edward Trawinski, former mayor of Fair Lawn (Republican)

==== Predictions ====
Source	Ranking	As of
The Cook Political Report	Safe D	October 29, 2004
Sabato's Crystal Ball	Safe D	November 1, 2004

==== Results ====
New Jersey's 9th congressional district election, 2004
Party	Candidate	Votes	%
Democratic	Steve Rothman (incumbent)	146,038	67.53%
Republican	Edward Trawinski	68,564	31.71%
Libertarian	David Daly	1,649	0.76%
Majority		77,474	35.83%
Turnout		216,251	
Democratic hold			

== District 10 ==
2004 New Jersey's 10th congressional district election
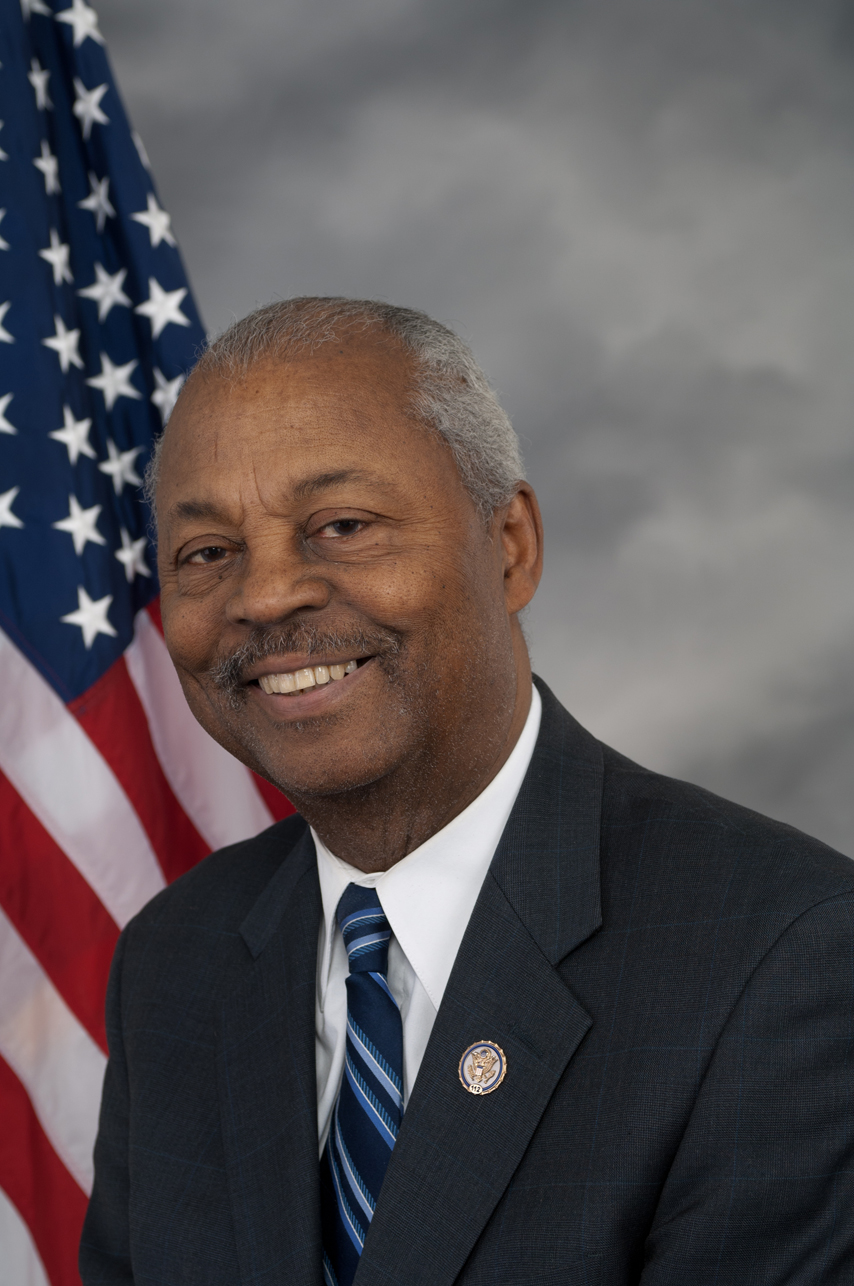

Nominee	Don Payne	Toy-Ling Washington
Party	Democratic	Green
Popular vote	155,697	2,927
Percentage	96.9%	1.3%
- County results Payne: 90–100%
U.S. Representative before election
Don Payne
Democratic
Elected U.S. Representative
incumbent
Democratic

No Republican challenged incumbent Democrat Donald M. Payne for this seat. Only minor parties also contested the election. This district covers a heavily urbanized area, which includes the city of Newark.

=== General election ===
==== Candidates ====
- Sara Lobman (Independent)
- Donald M. Payne, incumbent Representative from Newark since 1989 (Democratic)
- Toy-Ling Washington, candidate for State Senate in 2003 (Green)

==== Predictions ====
Source	Ranking	As of
The Cook Political Report	Safe D	October 29, 2004
Sabato's Crystal Ball	Safe D	November 1, 2004

==== Results ====
New Jersey's 10th congressional district election, 2004
Party	Candidate	Votes	%
Democratic	Don Payne (incumbent)	155,697	96.88%
Green	Toy-Ling Washington	2,927	1.30%
Independent	Sara Lobman	2,089	1.82%
Majority		152,770	95.06%
Turnout		160,713	
Democratic hold			

== District 11 ==
2004 New Jersey's 11th congressional district election
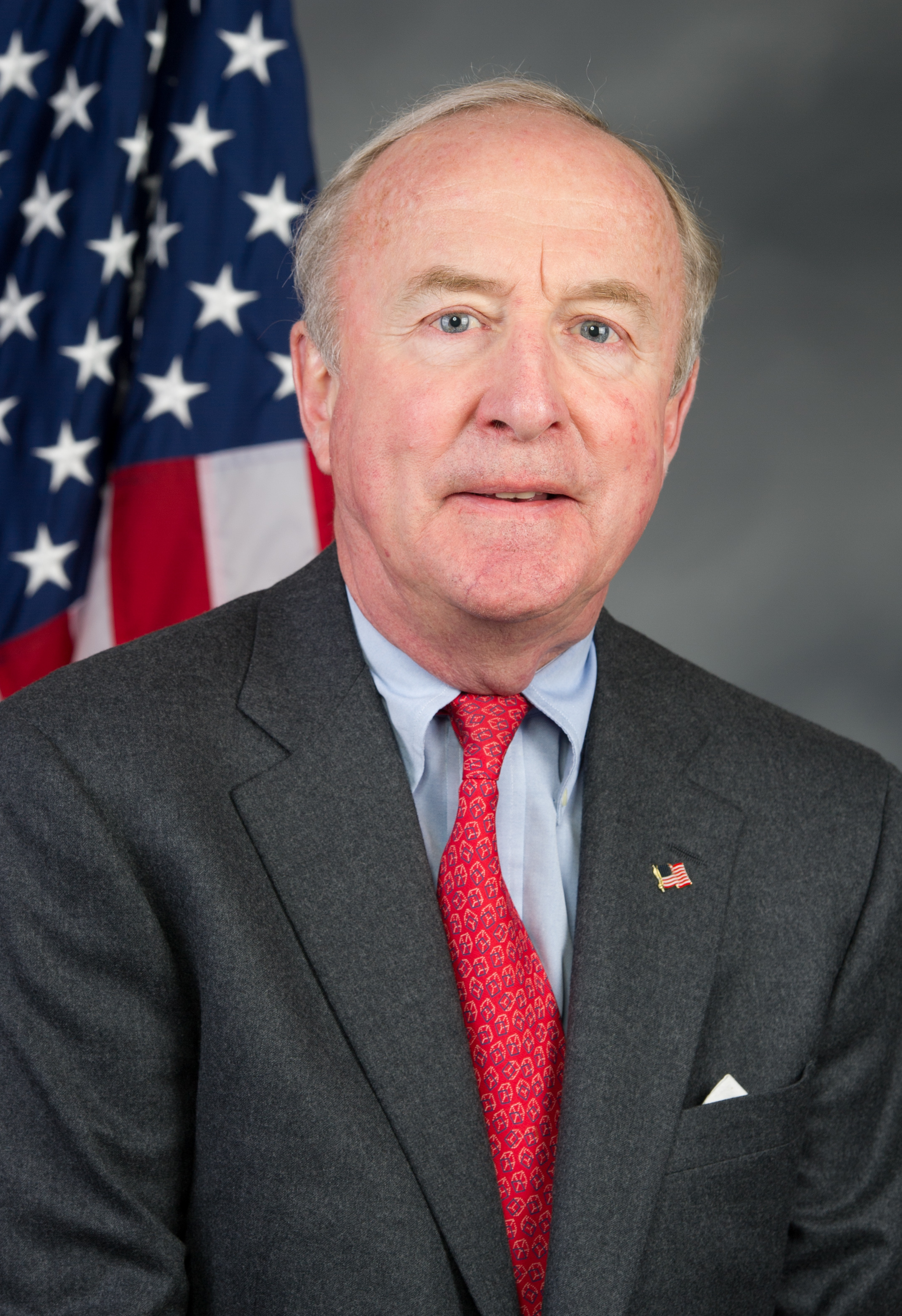

Nominee	Rodney Frelinghuysen	James Buell
Party	Republican	Democratic
Popular vote	200,915	91,811
Percentage	67.9%	31.0%
- County results Frelinghuysen: 50–60% 60–70% 70–80%
U.S. Representative before election
Rodney Frelinghuysen
Republican
Elected U.S. Representative
incumbent
Republican

Incumbent Republican Rodney Frelinghuysen defeated Democrat James Buell. This district covers mostly Morris County.

=== General election ===
==== Candidates ====
- James Buell (Democratic)
- Rodney Frelinghuysen, incumbent Representative from Harding since 1995 (Republican)
- Austin Lett (Libertarian)
- John Mele (Independent)

==== Predictions ====
Source	Ranking	As of
The Cook Political Report	Safe R	October 29, 2004
Sabato's Crystal Ball	Safe R	November 1, 2004

==== Results ====
New Jersey's 11th congressional district election, 2004
Party	Candidate	Votes	%
Republican	Rodney Frelinghuysen (incumbent)	200,915	67.88%
Democratic	James Buell	91,811	31.02%
Independent	John Mele	1,746	0.59%
Libertarian	Austin Lett	1,530	0.52%
Majority		109,104	36.86%
Turnout		296,002	
Republican hold			

== District 12 ==
2004 New Jersey's 12th congressional district election
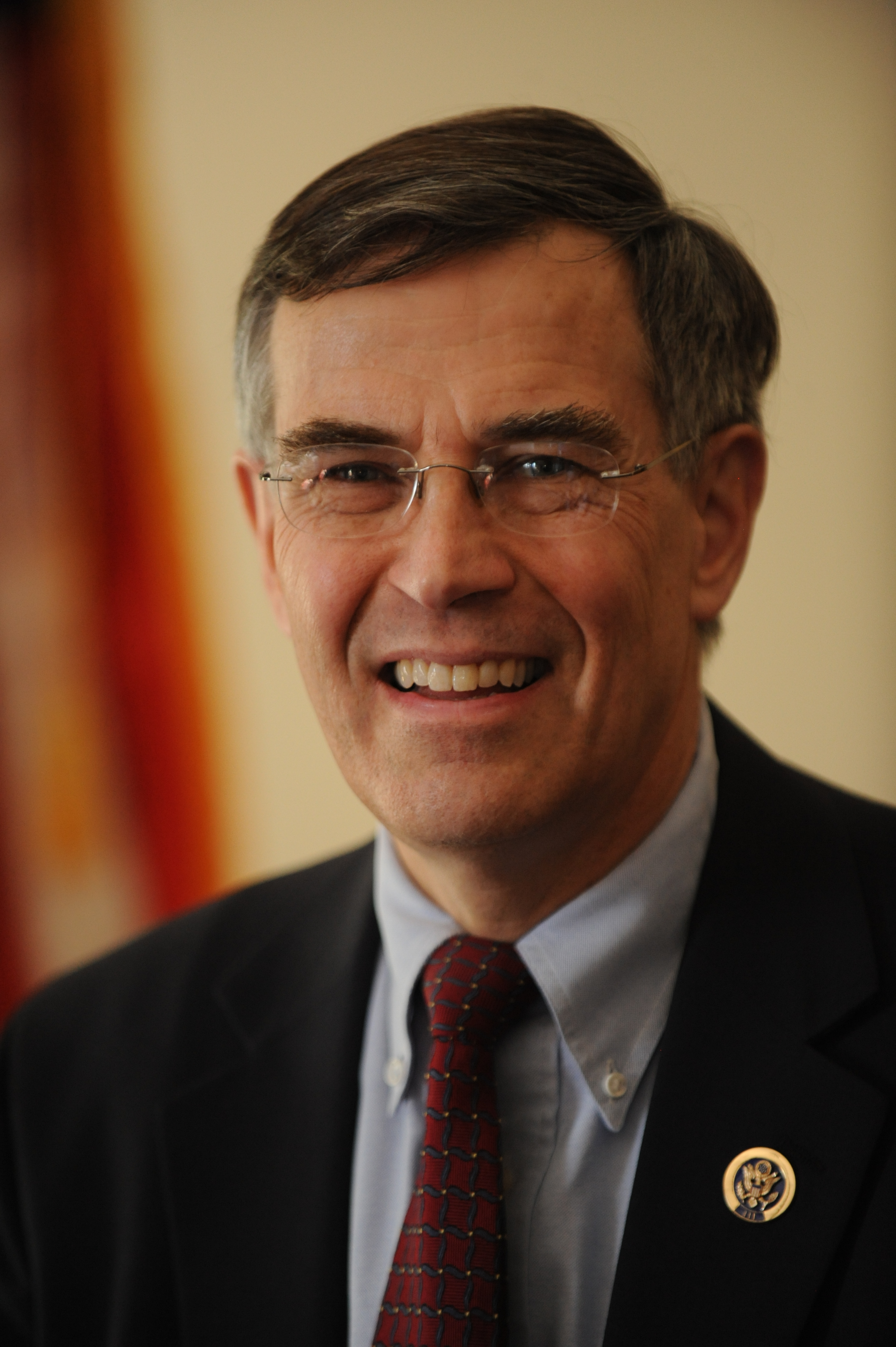

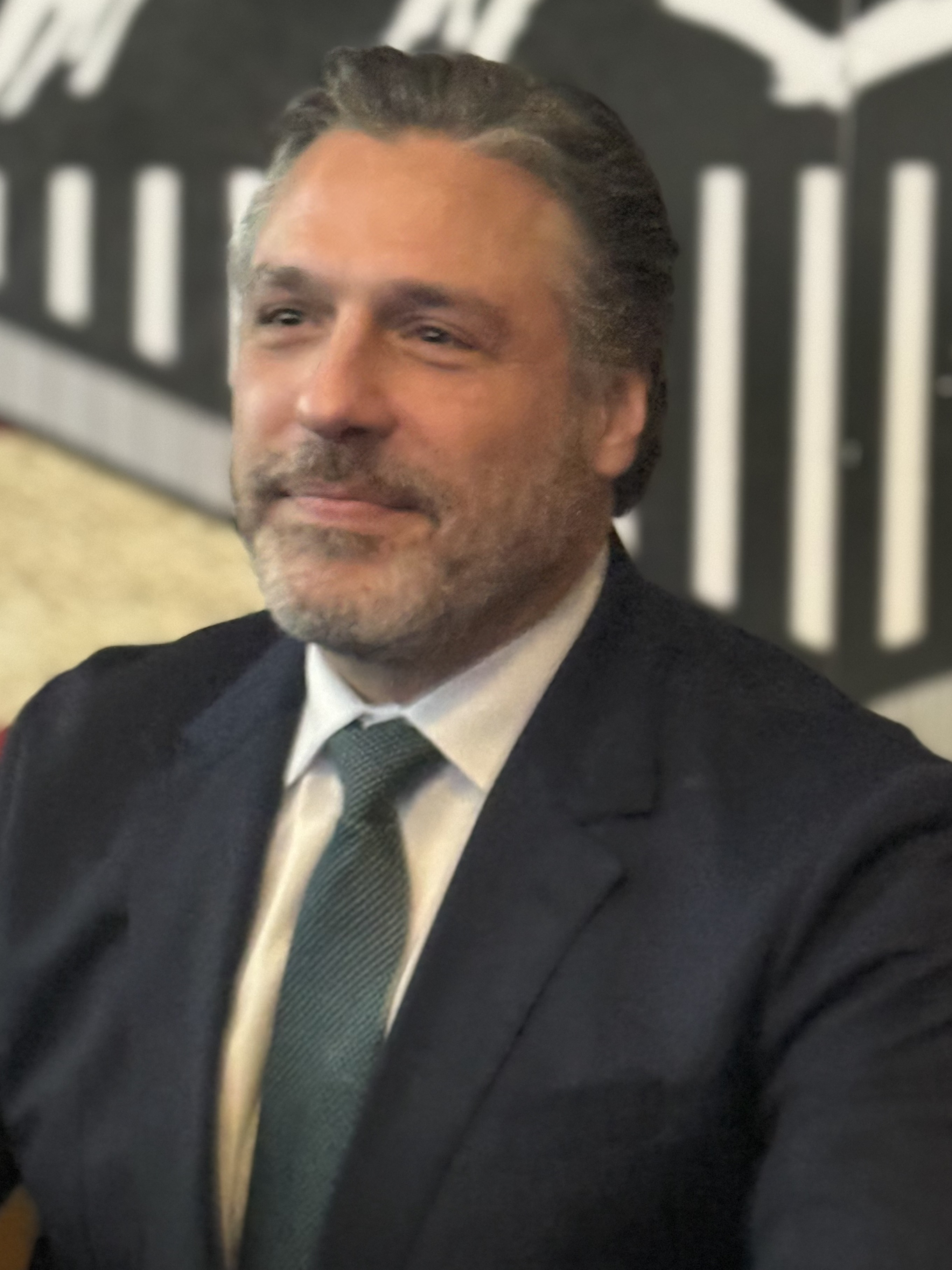
Nominee	Rush Holt	Bill Spadea
Party	Democratic	Republican
Popular vote	171,691	115,014
Percentage	59.3%	39.7%
- County results Holt: 50–60% 60–70% 70–80% Spadea: 50–60%
U.S. Representative before election
Rush Holt
Democratic
Elected U.S. Representative
incumbent
Democratic

Incumbent Democrat Rush Holt defeated Republican Bill Spadea. This district covers 5 suburban counties in the central part of the state. After losing the election to Holt, Spadea became a radio talk show host, made a run for the General Assembly in 2012, and ran for Governor of New Jersey in 2025.

=== General election ===
==== Candidates ====
- Daryl Brooks (Green)
- Ken Chazotte (Libertarian)
- Rush Holt Jr., incumbent Representative from Pennington since 1999 (Democratic)
- Bill Spadea, former chair of the College Republican National Committee (Republican)

==== Predictions ====
Source	Ranking	As of
The Cook Political Report	Safe D	October 29, 2004
Sabato's Crystal Ball	Safe D	November 1, 2004

==== Results ====
New Jersey's 12th congressional district election, 2004
Party	Candidate	Votes	%
Democratic	Rush Holt (incumbent)	171,691	59.25%
Republican	Bill Spadea	115,014	39.69%
Libertarian	Ken Chazotte	1,562	0.54%
Green	Daryl Brooks	1,518	0.52%
Majority		56,677	19.56%
Turnout		289,785	
Democratic hold			

== District 13 ==
2004 New Jersey's 13th congressional district election
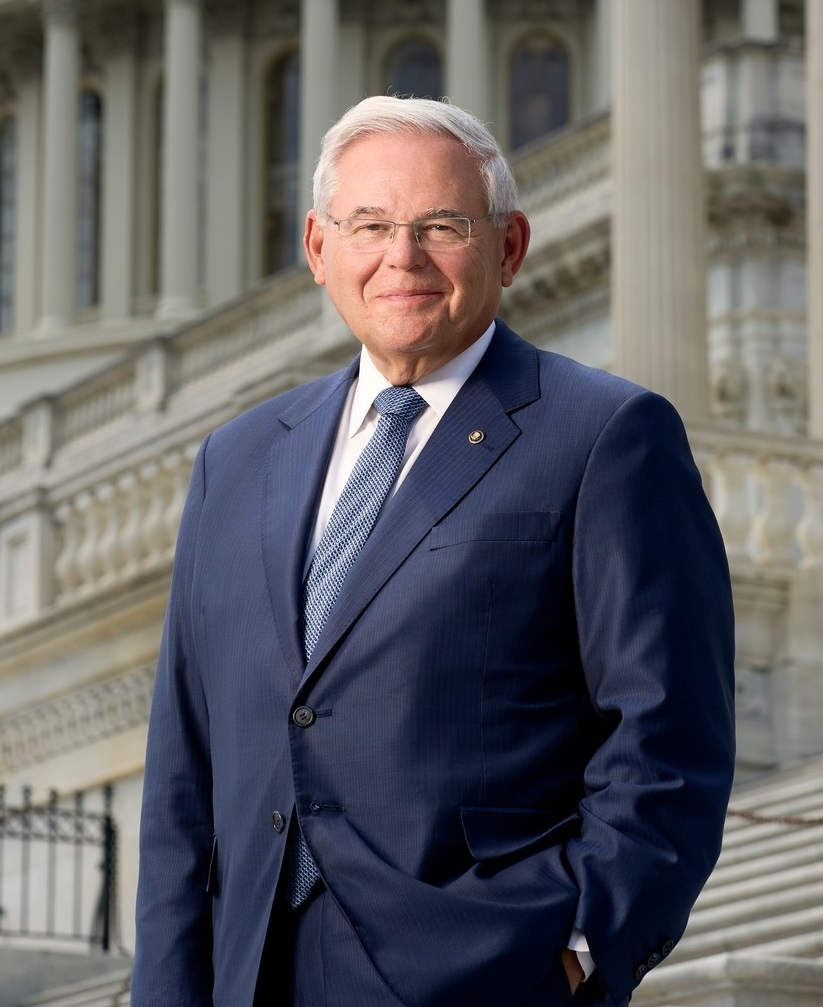

Nominee	Bob Menendez	Richard Piatkowski
Party	Democratic	Republican
Popular vote	121,018	35,288
Percentage	75.8%	22.1%
- County results Menendez: 70–80% 80–90%
U.S. Representative before election
Bob Menendez
Democratic
Elected U.S. Representative
incumbent
Democratic

Incumbent Democrat Bob Menendez defeated Republican Richard Piatkowski. This is a heavily urbanized district.

In the primary election, Menendez easily survived a challenge from Steve Fulop, who had received national attention for resigning from Goldman Sachs to join the Marine Corps following the September 11 attacks. Fulop would later go on to serve as mayor of Jersey City and ran for Governor of New Jersey in 2025, losing the primary to Mikie Sherrill.

=== Democratic primary ===
==== Candidates ====
- Steve Fulop, Marine Corps veteran
- Bob Menendez, incumbent Representative from Union City since 1993

==== Campaign ====
Fulop was hand-picked to challenge Menendez by Jersey City mayor Glenn Cunningham, who had an ongoing bitter feud with Menendez. Cunningham died from a heart attack on May 25.

==== Endorsements ====
Steve Fulop

Mayors

- Glenn Cunningham, mayor of Jersey City (died May 25)

=== General election ===
==== Candidates ====
- Dick Hester (Independent)
- Angela Lariscy (Independent)
- Bob Menendez, incumbent Representative from Union City since 1993 (Democratic)
- Richard Piatowski (Republican)
- Herbert Shaw, perennial candidate (Independent)

==== Predictions ====
Source	Ranking	As of
The Cook Political Report	Safe D	October 29, 2004
Sabato's Crystal Ball	Safe D	November 1, 2004

==== Results ====
New Jersey's 13th congressional district election, 2004
Party	Candidate	Votes	%
Democratic	Bob Menendez (incumbent)	121,018	75.85%
Republican	Richard Piatkowski	35,288	22.12%
Independent	Dick Hester	1,282	0.80%
Independent	Herbert Shaw	1,066	0.67%
Independent	Angela Lariscy	887	0.56%
Majority		85,730	53.74%
Turnout		159,541	
Democratic hold			
