= Stem cell research policy =

Stem cell research policy varies significantly throughout the world. There are overlapping jurisdictions of international organizations, nations, and states or provinces. Some government policies determine what is allowed versus prohibited, whereas others outline what research can be publicly financed. Of course, all practices not prohibited are implicitly permitted. Some organizations have issued recommended guidelines for how stem cell research is to be conducted.

== International bodies ==
The United Nations adopted a declaration on human cloning that can be interpreted as calling on member states to prohibit somatic cell nuclear transfer, or therapeutic cloning. In 2005, in a divided vote, "Member States were called on to adopt all measures necessary to prohibit all forms of human cloning in as much as they are incompatible with human dignity and the protection of human life."

The World Health Organization has opposed a ban on cloning techniques in stem cell research.

The Council of Europe's Convention on Human Rights and Biomedicine seems to ban the creation of embryos solely for research purposes. It has been signed by 31 countries and ratified by 19: Bulgaria, Croatia, Cyprus, the Czech Republic, Denmark, Estonia, Georgia, Greece, Hungary, Iceland, Lithuania, Moldova, Portugal, Romania, San Marino, Slovakia, Slovenia, Spain, and Turkey.

=== The Hinxton Group ===
Researchers, ethicists and assorted spokespersons from 14 different countries have published a set of legal and ethical guidelines relating to stem cell research, in an effort to address conflicting international laws in this area. The ‘Hinxton Group’ met recently for the first time, in Cambridge, and published a consensus statement calling for a ‘flexible’ regulatory framework, which can simultaneously accommodate rapid scientific advance and at the same time accommodate the diversity of international approaches towards stem cell science. It also recommends that, in countries which oppose embryonic stem cell research, scientists should be free to pursue their research elsewhere.

In light of the controversy surrounding Hwang Woo-Suk, the Hinxton Group has additionally recommended a number of measures intended to prevent fraud in stem cell research. The group has requested that all authors of embryonic stem cell papers submit a statement of authenticity of any new cell-lines and that the source of stem cells be clearly specified.

On the ethical issues surrounding embryonic stem cell research, the group has additionally recommended that an international database be created, containing guidelines for ethical practice, research protocols, consent forms, and the information provided to donors.

However, the potential for an international consensus on these matters seems remote given the complexity and diversity of regulatory frameworks in this controversial area of science, both within nations and between nations.

=== ISSCR ===
The International Society for Stem Cell Research is developing guidelines for the conduct of stem cell research.

== Nations ==
Embryonic stem cell research has divided the international community. In the European Union, stem cell research using the human embryo is permitted in Ireland, Sweden, Finland, Belgium, Greece, Britain, Denmark and the Netherlands; however it is illegal in Germany, Austria, Italy, and Portugal. The issue has similarly divided the United States, with several states enforcing a complete ban and others giving financial support. Elsewhere, Japan, India, Iran, Israel, South Korea, and China are supportive, Australia is partially supportive (exempting reproductive cloning yet allowing research on embryonic stem cells that are derived from the process of IVF); however New Zealand, most of Africa (excepting South Africa) and most of South America (excepting Brazil) are restrictive.
