= Steve Brozak =

American businessman

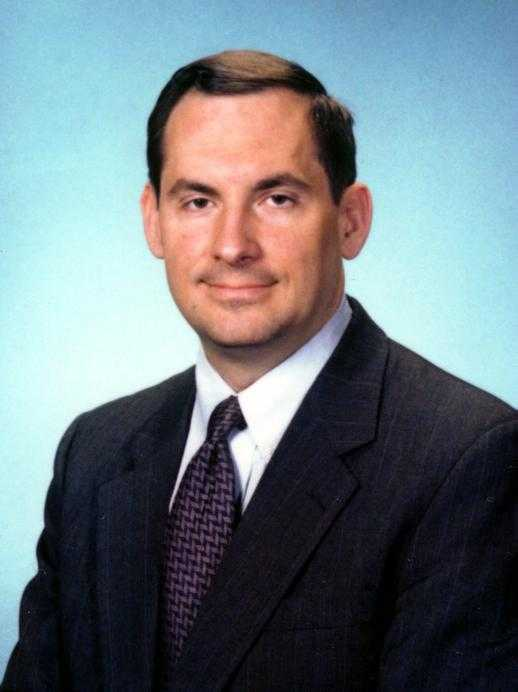
- Born: 1961 (age 64–65); New York City, New York, U.S.
- Education: Columbia University School of General Studies; Columbia Business School; Drew University
- Occupations: President of WBB Securities, LLC; Financial Analyst; Investment Banker
- Military career
- Allegiance: United States
- Branch: United States Marine Corps
- Service years: 1982-1985 (Active); 1986-2001 (Reserve); 2001-2003 (Active)
- Rank: Lieutenant Colonel

Steve Brozak (born 1961) is the Managing Partner and President of WBB Securities, LLC, a Democratic congressional candidate in the 2004 American election cycle, and was the chairman and CEO of StormBio, Inc. Brozak was named a 2013 StarMine "Top Stock Picker" among Pharmaceutical Analysts by the Thomson Reuters Awards for Excellence, and was recognized by The Wall Street Journal as "Best on the Street" among Medical Equipment and Supplies financial analysts. Brozak is a retired Lieutenant Colonel in the United States Marine Corps. He served a three-year appointment to the Secretary of Navy's Navy and Marine Corps Retiree Council. He also is a Fellow of Foreign Policy Association.

== Education ==
Brozak received his BA from Columbia University (1982), MBA from Columbia Business School (1994) and Doctor of Medical Humanities (DMH) from Drew University (2016).

== Career ==
Brozak is the President and co-founder of WBB Securities, LLC, an independent broker dealer, investment bank and sell-side research firm. WBB Securities focuses on healthcare, biotechnology, pharmaceutical and medical device research and banking. WBB Securities and its analysts are ranked consistently as top performers in research accuracy. In September 2016, WBB Securities added an asset management arm to the firm, which subsequently launched a long/short equity healthcare fund named WBB Life Sciences l/s.

As president of WBB Securities, Brozak is responsible for the research and investment banking division. He raises funds for public offerings in various healthcare sectors. He has been ranked one of the top analysts of all First Call submitting analysts in all healthcare sectors over the past five years by the StarMine ranking system. In 2010, he was named one of the Top Analysts in the Healthcare Sector for the United States by the Financial Times and StarMine. As being named 2013 StarMine "top stock picker" among Pharmaceutical Analysts, Brozak has achieved top-ranking recognition in all healthcare fields including Biotechnology, Medical Devices, and Pharmaceuticals over the last five years by the Thomson Reuters Awards for Excellence and The Wall Street Journal Best on the Street Survey. He is a Fellow of the Foreign Policy Association.

Brozak has specific expertise and interest in human stem cell therapies, biothreat countermeasures, bacterium, and viruses such as highly pathogenic influenza, Marburg, and Ebola.

He is a contributor to Forbes, Businessweek, STAT, CNN, and ABCNews.com while regularly authoring articles in peer-reviewed and news publications. Among articles are:

- "How Mental Health Is Shortchanged by Lack of Reimbursement for Vagus Nerve Stimulation", which appeared in the journal Brain Stimulation March–April 2016;
- "Stopping Ebola: Mali Matters; Maine and Manhattan Don't" on businessweek.com October 30, 2014;
- "No Longer the King of the North, Pfizer Looks to Recapture Crown" on Forbes.com April 30, 2014;
- "With Big Pharma In Retreat, Ackman And Novartis Try A New Blueprint For Drug Companies" on Forbes.com March 22, 2014;
- "Google: Just What The Doctor Ordered" on Forbes.com December 19, 2013;
- "The 5 Things You Should Know When Your Healthcare Claim Is "Denied"" on Forbes.com October 26, 2013;
- "Breaking US Healthcare: Sequestration, Shutdown And The Looming Debt Ceiling" on Forbes.com October 9, 2013;
- "The Antibiotic Bubble -- A Quest For Continued Antibiotic Effectiveness" on Forbes.com May 7, 2013;
- "Meningitis Outbreak: Restoring Confidence in the Drug Industry" on ABC News October 16, 2012;
- "A Case for Accelerating Regenerative Medicine" on ABC News, April 12, 2012;
- "A New American 11/11/11 Day: The Health Care Veterans Deserve" also on ABC News, November 11, 2011;
- "Fighting Epidemics With Venture Capital", which appeared on the Bloomberg BGov Web site;
- "Seeking Innovation: Incentive Funding for Biodefense Biotechs", which appeared in the peer-reviewed journal: Biosecurity and Bioterrorism: Biodefense Strategy, Practice, and Science, Volume 8, Number 4, 2010.
- He also is a co-author of "Long shadow of the stem-cell ruling", an opinion article that appeared in Nature, the International Weekly Journal of Science, Volume 467, 1031–1033 (28 October 2010).

Brozak is frequently interviewed and quoted by such media sources as the Associated Press, ABC, Barron's, Bloomberg, CNN, Financial Times, Forbes, Dow Jones, Reuters, USA Today, TheStreet.com, and The Wall Street Journal. He is featured in the British Medical Journal raising awareness among the cleanliness of endoscopic procedures within the United States. He is co-author of three commentaries about the failure of the Fukushima Daichi nuclear power plants and the potential impact on the world, published by ABCNews.com. They include: Fukushima Joins Titanic, Katrina as a Single Word for Disaster, March 16, 2011, Fukushima: A Nuclear Threat to Japan, the U.S. and the World, April 6, 2011 and Fukushima and Nuclear Power: Playing with Fire, April 25, 2011. He also is the author of twelve analytical reports about the threat of pandemic influenza, has written guest editorials and been asked to speak about several issues, including the challenges facing large pharmaceutical companies, the need to restructure the U.S. Food and Drug Administration, and difficulties facing the U.S. healthcare system.

Brozak participated in the production of two films- as an Associate Producer of Money for Nothing: Inside the Federal Reserve (2013) and as Executive Producer of American Veteran (2017).

Brozak was chairman and CEO of StormBio, Inc, a development stage biotechnology company focused on the attenuation of Cytokine Storm, specifically in influenza. StormBio was developing therapeutics to minimize the mortality and morbidity resulting from Highly Pathogenic Influenza infections, such as H5N1 and H1N1 influenza strains.

StormBio's approach was to modulate runaway inflammation. Many of the deaths and much of the permanent damage from influenza is caused by a runaway inflammatory process called cytokine storm. It was anticipated that StormBio's therapeutics also could be used to treat a variety of other inflammatory conditions. StormBio was affiliated with leading scientists in the field of inflammation and had in-licensed intellectual property and novel therapeutics directed at treating people in the event of an influenza pandemic.

=== Political life ===
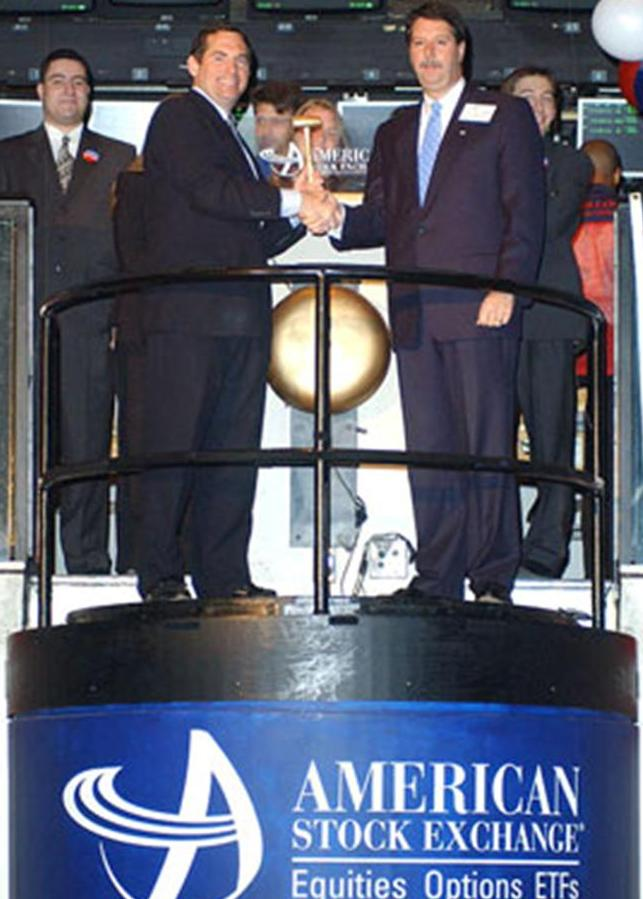
Steve Brozak with Chairman & CEO, Salvatore Sodano opening the American Stock Exchange on August 2, 2004

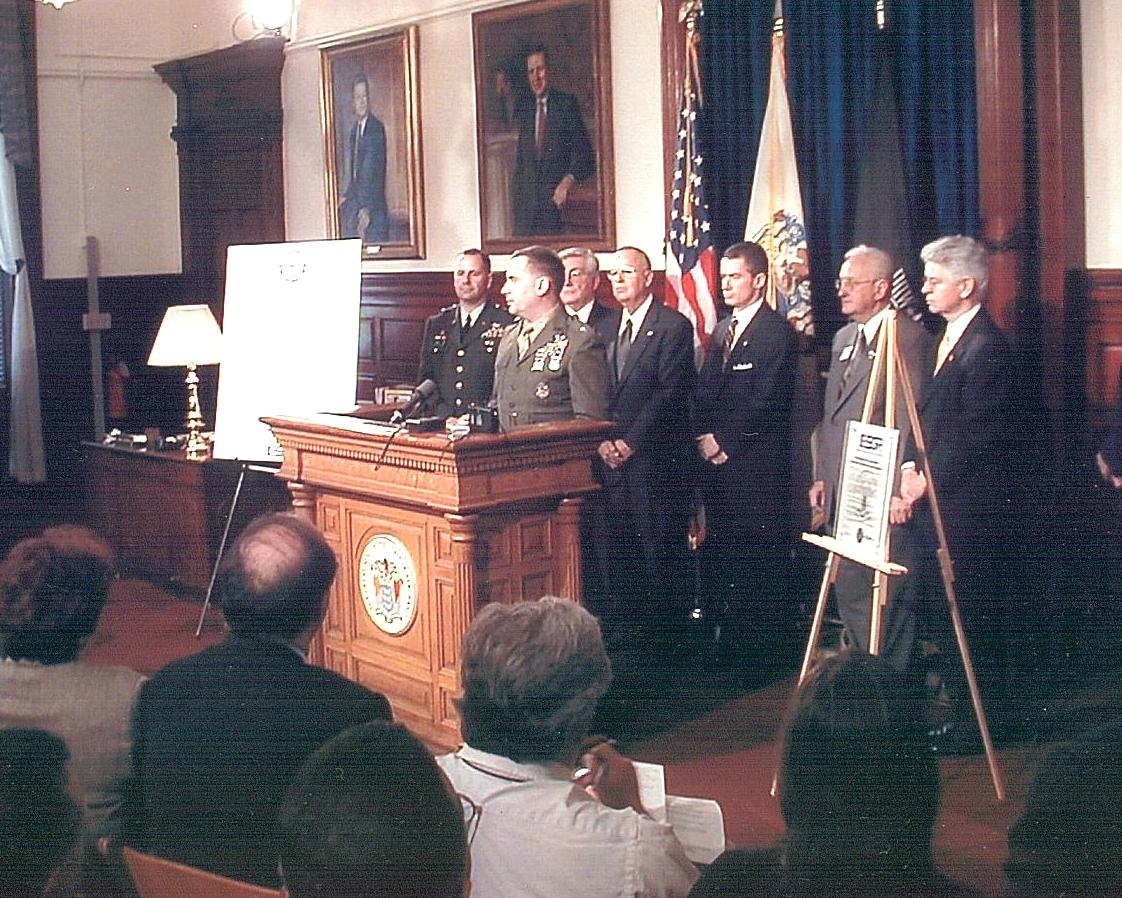
LtCol Steve Brozak USMCR speaking at the state capitol in Trenton at the NJ Governor's SOS Ceremony on May 14, 2003

Campaigning for Congress during the 2004 election, Brozak kicked off his campaign with a front-page feature story, "A Marine Jumps Party Lines to Join Democrats in Trenches", in The Wall Street Journal, where he gave early warning of the nearly insurmountable challenges faced by the shortage of U.S. troops in Iraq and the need for a modified strategy to subdue insurgency and create a secure nation in Iraq. His campaign focused on the lack of planning for the Iraq war, the strain it placed on our military, and the severe economic repercussions that would ensue—specifically the rise in energy prices. He also stressed the need for unfettered research in stem cells and the need for a fair trade policy with other countries. Brozak was featured in an article in the magazine Salon, which described his campaign as "a referendum on Bush's military folly."

During his Congressional campaign, Brozak was invited to speak during prime time at the 2004 Democratic National Convention, where he criticized the Bush administration for lack of planning prior to the war in Iraq. He was later criticized by bloggers in the Internet publication, The Weekly Standard for his strong position against administration partisanship in political appointments at the Pentagon. Brozak was defeated by incumbent Mike Ferguson (Republican) for New Jersey's 7th Congressional District.

=== Military career ===
Brozak is a retired Lieutenant Colonel in the United States Marine Corps, having served in Europe, the Middle East, Asia, and the Caribbean. He has been attached to units within the United Nations, specifically as a Foreign area officer at the U.S. Mission to the United Nations, and as a Public Information Officer in the United Nations Mission in Haiti (UNMIH). Brozak was also attached to units within NATO (North Atlantic Treaty Organization) and has worked with the Inter-American Defense Board.

Brozak resumed active duty service in the Marine Corps immediately after the September 11 attacks in 2001 as Officer in Charge of Mobilization Training Unit NY- 17 in New York City. He later served as part of Operation Enduring Freedom, leading a team to the Middle East to evaluate National Guard and Reserve mobilization. Upon returning from Iraq, his team wrote a report that criticized the lack of troop strength and drain on the reserves caused by the Iraq/Afghanistan deployments. His subsequent active duty assignment before retiring was Chief Spokesperson for OSD's National Committee for the Employer support of the Guard and Reserve in Washington D.C. Brozak participated as a Marine Corps officer representing the Department of Navy and Marine Corps retirees on the SECNAV Retiree Council. Brozak was twice awarded the Navy/Marine Corps Meritorious Service Medal, his last one for his efforts in Washington.

== Personal life ==
Born in 1961, Brozak is married and has two children. Brozak has been a resident of Westfield, New Jersey.

== Published works ==
- "Does the GI Bill Even Work" CNN, November 11, 2014
- "Why the Ebola Crisis Won't End Without Military Intervention" Businessweek, September 16, 2014
- "A 21st Century Nosocomial Issue with Endoscopes" British Medical Journal, March 19, 2014
- "Meningitis Outbreak: Restoring Confidence in the Drug-Industry" ABC News, October 16, 2012
- "A Case for Accelerating Regenerative Medicine" ABC News, April 12, 2012
- "A New American 11/11/11 Day: The Health Care Veterans Deserve" ABC News, November 11, 2011
- "Seeking Innovation: Incentive Funding for Biodefense Biotechs" Biosecurity and Bioterrorism: Biodefense Strategy, Practice and Science Volume 8, Number 4, 2010.
- "Long Shadow of the Stem-Cell Ruling" Nature, the International Weekly Journal of Science, Volume 467, 1031–1033 (28 October 2010).
- Fukushima and Nuclear Power: Playing with Fire, April 25, 2011
- Fukushima: A Nuclear Threat to Japan, the U.S. and the World, April 6, 2011
- Fukushima Joins Titanic, Katrina as a Single Word for Disaster, March 16, 2011
- "Winners and Losers of the Greek Financial Crisis" abcnews.com. May 12, 2010.
- "Four Standard-Bearers For Stem Cell Therapies" Forbes.com. April 23, 2010.
- "How the Euro's Woes Could Affect the Economic - and Individual - Health" abcnews.com. February 25, 2010.
- "The Facts Versus the Truth about Swine Flu" abcnews.com. September 3, 2009.
- "Attack of the Zombie Biotechs" Forbes.com. April 2, 2009.
- "Why Your Health Care Is in Jeopardy" abcnews.com. February 19, 2009.
- "Caution - The FDA Could Be Hazardous to Your Health" Food and Drug Law Journal. January/February 2009.
- "The Future of the FDA in the Next Administration" abcnews.com. October 27, 2008.
- "The China Syndrome" abcnews.com. June 15, 2007.
- "War Is a Force that Gives Us Meaning" Book Review Marine Corps Gazette. August 2003.
- "The Marine Corps, the media, and the 21st century" Marine Corps Gazette. January 2002.
