= Alexander Freeman =

Alexander Freeman may refer to:

- Alexander Freeman (film director) (born 1987), American film director, producer, and screenwriter
- Alexander Freeman (footballer) (born 1970), Liberian footballer
- Alexander Freeman (mathematician) (1838–1897), English astronomer and mathematician
- Alexander Freiman (1879–1968), Polish-Soviet linguist
- Alex Freeman (born 2004), American soccer player
