= SSG =

SSG may refer to:

== Organizations ==
- Chief of Naval Operations Strategic Studies Group, US
- Safesoft Global, later Seioglobal, a Chinese IT company
- Samsung Galaxy (esports), a professional esports works team of Samsung Electronics
- Särskilda Skyddsgruppen, a Swedish special forces unit
- Shinsegae, a South Korean company
- Spacestation Gaming, an esports organization
- Special Service Group, a Pakistani special forces unit
- Special Surveillance Group of the US FBI
- Strategic Studies Group, an Australian wargame software company
- Subaltern Studies Group, studying post-colonial societies
- Syrian Salvation Government, a separatist group involved in the Syrian Civil War

== Sniper rifles ==
German initials for Scharfschützengewehr (sharpshooter or sniper rifle)

- Steyr SSG 69, Austria, 1969
- SSG 82, East Germany, 1982
- SIG Sauer SSG 2000, Swiss/German, 1989
- SIG Sauer SSG 3000, Swiss/German, 1992
- Steyr SSG 04, Austria, 2004
- Steyr SSG 08, Austria, 2008

== Other uses ==
- L'Entente SSG, a French association football team
- Security sector governance, a sub-concept of governance
- Seimat language, ISO 639-3 language code
- Server supported gaming, gambling technology
- Software-controlled Sound Generator, Yamaha YM2149F version of General Instrument AY-3-8910 IC
- US Navy hull classification for cruise missile submarines
- Staff sergeant
- SuperSmart Grid, proposed international electricity grid
- Static site generator, web frameworks which produce static web pages
- Abbreviation for Swiss Standard German
- Symbolic Stream Generator, Unisys software
- The IATA code for Malabo International Airport
- Structural Silicone Glazing, a type of glazing used in curtain wall (architecture)
- Stade Saint-Germain, a French association football club
- Self-sustaining glider
- SSG Landers, a South Korean professional baseball team
