= Billy Ray (screenwriter) =

American screenwriter and film director (born 1962)

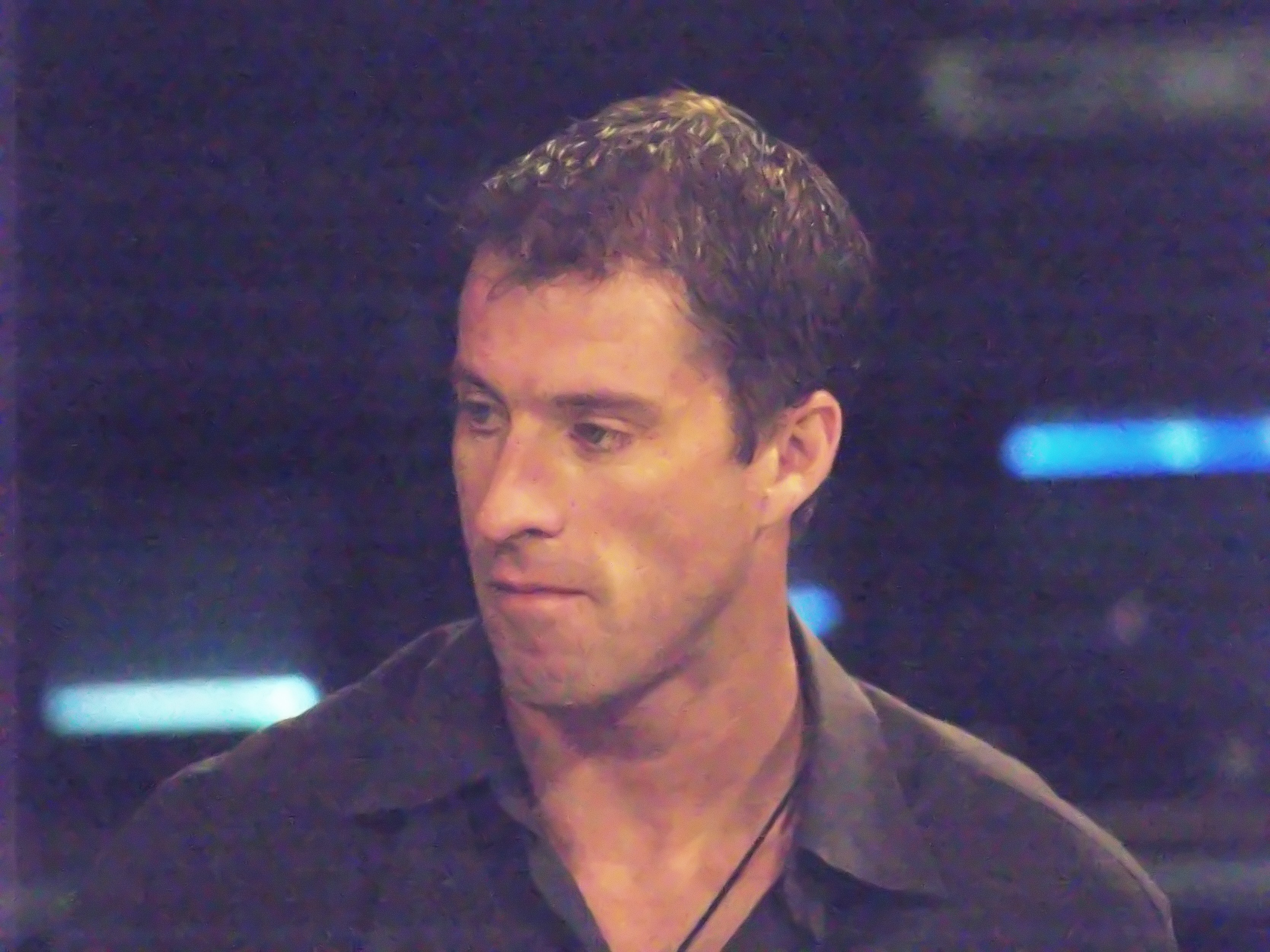
- Ray in 2007
- Born: 1962 (age 63–64); Los Angeles, California, U.S.
- Occupations: Film director, screenwriter
- Spouse: Stacy Sherman

Billy Ray (born 1962) is an American screenwriter and film director. He began writing for television and movies in 1994 with Color of Night. He co-wrote the first Hunger Games film (2012), and returned to the franchise for 2026's Sunrise on the Reaping, and earned an Oscar nomination for his work on Captain Phillips (2013). He has also directed three films based on his own screenplays: Shattered Glass (2003), Breach (2007), and Secret in Their Eyes (2015).

== Biography ==
Ray was born in Los Angeles, and raised in Encino, Los Angeles, California. He is from a Jewish family, and attended Steven Wise Temple and Birmingham High School. Starting in 2003, he began to direct as well as write; his first film was Shattered Glass, inspired by the true story of Stephen Glass, a journalist who fabricated a majority of his stories. He was nominated for Most Promising Filmmaker by the Chicago Film Critics Association and an Independent Spirit Award for Best Screenplay for his work on this film. Breach (2007), which Ray co-wrote and directed, tells a similar story about Robert Hanssen, an FBI agent convicted of spying for the Soviet Union and later, Russia, for more than two decades, and Eric O'Neill, who worked as his assistant and helped bring about his downfall.

He is perhaps best known for writing the screenplay to the 2012 blockbuster, The Hunger Games, and his Academy Award-nominated screenplay for the 2013 film, Captain Phillips. Ray also worked with the advertising agency Barkley to help write the AMC Theatres 2021 "We Make Movies Better" campaign starring Nicole Kidman.

In 2026, Scholastic published Ray's first young adult novel, Burn the Water.

== Filmography ==
Films

Year	Title	Director	Writer	Producer
1994	Color of Night	No	Yes	No
1995	The Shooter	No	Yes	No
1997	Volcano	No	Yes	No
2002	Hart's War	No	Yes	No
2003	Shattered Glass	Yes	Yes	No
2004	Suspect Zero	No	Yes	No
2005	Flightplan	No	Yes	No
2007	Breach	Yes	Yes	No
2009	State of Play	No	Yes	No
2012	The Hunger Games	No	Yes	No
2013	Captain Phillips	No	Yes	No
2015	The Breakup Girl	No	No	Yes
2015	Secret in Their Eyes	Yes	Yes	No
2018	Overlord	No	Yes	No
2019	Gemini Man	No	Yes	No
2019	Terminator: Dark Fate	No	Yes	Co-producer
2019	Richard Jewell	No	Yes	No
2026	Animals	No	Yes	No
2026	The Hunger Games: Sunrise on the Reaping	No	Yes	No

Uncredited rewrites

- Stuart Little (1999)
- Source Code (2011)
- Ghost in the Shell (2017)
- Tron: Ares (2025)

Television

Year	Title	Director	Writer	Executive producer	Notes
1994–1995	Earth 2	No	Yes	No	Co-creator
1998	Legalese	No	Yes	No	Television film
2016–2017	The Last Tycoon	Yes	Yes	Yes	Also developer
2020	The Comey Rule	Yes	Yes	Yes	Miniseries
