= Felix Bloch (diplomatic officer) =

American government official (born 1935)

- Born: July 19, 1935 (age 91); Vienna, Austria
- Occupations: Former Director of European and Canadian Affairs in the United States Department of State

Felix Bloch (/blɒk/; German: [blɔx]; born July 19, 1935) is a former director of European and Canadian Affairs in the United States Department of State. He is known for his connection to the Robert Hanssen espionage case.

Hanssen, a Federal Bureau of Investigation (FBI) agent who was a spy for the Soviet Union and later Russia, reported to his KGB handlers about ongoing FBI investigations of Bloch and Reino Gikman in order to save them from possible arrest. Gikman escaped to Moscow and made a warning phone call to Bloch only later. The FBI intercepted this and other espionage-related phone calls, but was unable to collect enough evidence to charge Bloch with any crime. Bloch worked a total of 32 years at the State Department.

== FBI investigation ==
In May 1989, Bloch had a dinner meeting in Paris with a man he says he knew as "Pierre Bart," a fellow stamp collector. Bloch at this time was stationed in Washington, D.C., but was one of the top European specialists in the State Department. The meeting occurred during an official visit by Bloch to France. "Bart" was a Soviet agent who lived in Paris and had previously lived in Vienna under the name Reino Gikman. Unbeknownst to Bloch, the entire meeting was closely watched by French counterintelligence agents. Surveillance showed that Bloch had taken a shoulder bag of unknown contents to the meeting, which Bloch left with "Bart" at the end of the dinner. Bloch would later state that the bag contained stamps which he left for Bart.

Bloch would later have a meeting with Gikman in Brussels, but the American authorities did not ask Belgian authorities to observe the meeting, in part because of fears the Belgian intelligence service was penetrated by the Soviets. The CIA observed parts of the meeting but could not determine if Bloch passed any documents to Gikman. Shortly afterward, the surveillance project came to an end: Bloch received a phone call from Gikman, taped by the FBI, alluding to an "illness" on Gikman's part and the expressed hope that Bloch did not receive the same thing. As this call came three weeks after their last meeting, it appeared highly unlikely the true subject of the call was a communicable ailment such as cold or flu. It would later emerge that the veracity of "Gikman's" claimed birth date and other identity details could not be verified. Gikman and Bloch were known to have lived in Vienna at about the same time, and American officials would come to suspect Gikman had been Bloch's handler. However there is no proof the two men met at that time.

A 1989 story in The New York Times stated that Bloch had frequented a prostitute in Vienna, paying her as much as $10,000 yearly for sadomasochistic sex, and that the FBI had called the prostitute to testify regarding their encounters to a federal grand jury. According to the story, agents suspected the Soviets were either indulging Bloch's tastes, or had blackmailed him into becoming their spy. In any event, Bloch appeared to lack any financial motive for spying, as in the 1980s his assets were apparently in the range of $300,000 to $1 million. State Department officials at times have suggested they thought Bloch may have sold classified information merely out of pique at being passed over for promotions.

The Gikman phone call regarding the "illness" led U.S. officials to believe their investigation had been exposed. They therefore decided to confront Bloch. Agents demanded that he confess to spying, but he steadfastly held to his explanation about stamp collecting. The lack of any conclusive evidence against Bloch led to an extraordinary media firestorm. Bloch was suspended from his job. For the next six months, Bloch was followed everywhere by a horde of FBI agents and news reporters, who quickly learned of the extraordinary news that a high-ranking diplomat was suspected of spying. Bloch, an avid walker, once led the following horde on a 22-mile trek. In an absurd incident, Bloch was once sitting in a park when children began to taunt him as a "spy" and a man identifying himself as a Vietnam veteran hit Bloch in the head; at which point an FBI agent persuaded the man to leave. Another incident featured a staged "reenactment" of a fictionalized meeting between Bloch and a Soviet agent by a network news crew; the network's anchor later apologized on air for the incident. In November 1989 the FBI withdrew its surveillance and the media circus began to subside.

== Termination of employment ==
In February 1990, the State Department moved to terminate Bloch's employment. Press reports at the time suggested that the State Department possessed recorded conversations between Bloch and his wife in which Bloch acknowledged he had received money from the Soviet Union for several years. It is not known whether these tapes were used in the termination proceedings, which were closed to the public. Bloch's employment was terminated and he was dismissed from the State Department without benefit of a pension.

== Aftermath ==
Bloch was not charged criminally, and moved to North Carolina. Despite his substantial assets, Bloch chose menial work as a supermarket cashier, beginning in 1992. He took a second job driving buses for Chapel Hill Transit. He appears to have lived an uneventful life there but was arrested twice for shoplifting, first in 1993 and again in 1994. Despite being caught by bagger Shannon Norman and the store manager, the 1993 charge was dismissed. Bloch pleaded guilty to shoplifting in 1994, receiving a 30-day suspended sentence. In a 2001 interview, Bloch's bus-driving supervisor described him as a good employee who worked hard.

== Connection to Robert Hanssen case ==
Of all the unanswered questions in the Bloch affair, one of the largest was how the investigation had been blown to the Soviets. Over a decade later, US authorities discovered that Robert Hanssen had been responsible for alerting the Soviets to the investigation. The investigation into the suspected mole had first led officials, however, to misguided suspicion of a CIA official, Brian Kelley. Kelley was placed under surveillance for years and his CIA career was badly damaged. Investigators later became satisfied he had been completely innocent, and he only fell under suspicion because personal data about him fit a matrix that investigators felt they might be looking for in a mole. Hanssen's downfall renewed speculation that Bloch would at last be charged, but that did not happen.
