= Breach (2007 film) =

2007 film by Billy Ray

- Original theatrical release poster
- Directed by: Billy Ray
- Screenplay by: Billy Ray; Adam Mazer; William Rotko
- Story by: Adam Mazer; William Rotko
- Produced by: Bobby Newmyer; Scott Kroopf; Adam Merims; Scott Strauss
- Starring: Chris Cooper; Ryan Phillippe; Laura Linney; Dennis Haysbert; Caroline Dhavernas; Gary Cole; Kathleen Quinlan
- Cinematography: Tak Fujimoto
- Edited by: Jeffrey Ford
- Music by: Mychael Danna
- Production companies: Sidney Kimmel Entertainment; Outlaw Productions; Intermedia Films
- Distributed by: Universal Pictures (North America); Kimmel International (Overseas; through Metro-Goldwyn-Mayer)
- Release date: February 16, 2007
- Running time: 110 minutes
- Country: United States
- Language: English
- Budget: $23 million
- Box office: $41 million

Breach is a 2007 American spy thriller film directed by Billy Ray, who wrote the screenplay with Adam Mazer and William Rotko. The film is based on the true story of Robert Hanssen, an FBI agent convicted of spying for the Soviet Union and later Russia off and on for more than two decades. The film stars Chris Cooper as Hanssen and Ryan Phillippe as Eric O'Neill, the FBI investigator who helped bring about Hanssen's downfall. The film received generally positive reviews and grossed $41 million on a $23 million budget.

== Plot ==
Eric O'Neill is a young ambitious FBI employee assigned to work undercover as a clerk to Robert Hanssen, a senior agent he is told is suspected of being a sexual deviant. Hanssen has been recalled from a detail post at the State Department to FBI headquarters ostensibly to head up a new division specializing in information assurance.

Initially, Hanssen insists on a strict formality between the two men. He frequently rails against the bureaucracy of the FBI and complains that only those who regularly "shoot guns" are considered for senior positions instead of those, like himself, who are involved in vital national security matters. He calls the bureau's information technology systems antiquated and laments the lack of coordination and information exchange with other intelligence agencies.

Eventually, Hanssen becomes a friend and mentor to O'Neill and takes a personal interest in him and his wife Juliana, who is suspicious of Hanssen and resents his intrusions. A devout Catholic who is also a member of Opus Dei, Hanssen urges O'Neill, a lapsed Catholic, and his secular East German-born wife to become active churchgoers.

O'Neill finds no evidence of Hanssen leading a secret double life and develops a growing respect for his boss, leading him to confront his handler in the undercover assignment, Kate Burroughs. She admits that the sexual deviance allegations are only a secondary consideration and that Hanssen is suspected of having spied for the Soviet Union and Russia for years and being responsible for the deaths of agents working for the United States. The entire Information Assurance Division that Hanssen now heads was created specifically to lure him away from his previous job as liaison to the State Department, and his office was specially constructed with hidden surveillance equipment. The investigation already includes fifty agents, and is personally overseen by FBI Director Louis Freeh, who has been reading O'Neill's reports on Hanssen.

Although the FBI already has enough evidence to arrest Hanssen, Director Freeh wants to catch Hanssen in the act of making a drop so that their case against him will be airtight, ensuring that he will cooperate once arrested and not retaliate by exposing more undercover agents and informants. O'Neill is ordered to obtain data from Hanssen's Palm Pilot and keep him occupied while FBI agents search his car and plant covert listening devices in it.

The tracking devices in Hanssen's car cause interference with the radio, which makes Hanssen suspicious. He also wonders why he was placed in an isolated position in the FBI only a few months before he is scheduled to retire. He tells O'Neill he believes he is being watched by Russian agents. The FBI intercepts a message he sends to his Russian handlers saying he will not provide any more information. O'Neill convinces Hanssen that he is not being trailed by the Russians or by him on behalf of the FBI. With his confidence restored, Hanssen makes one last dead drop of stolen information and the FBI catches him in the act.

Although he is assured promotion, O'Neill is discouraged by the toll the case has taken on his marriage and opts to leave the agency. When O'Neill leaves his office with his belongings, he unexpectedly encounters Hanssen in an elevator being escorted by arresting officers. A tearful Hanssen asks O'Neill to pray on his behalf, and O'Neill promises he will.

== Cast ==
- Chris Cooper as Robert Hanssen
- Ryan Phillippe as Eric O'Neill
- Laura Linney as Kate Burroughs
- Dennis Haysbert as Dean Plesac
- Caroline Dhavernas as Juliana O'Neill
- Gary Cole as Rich Garces
- Bruce Davison as John O'Neill
- Kathleen Quinlan as Bonnie Hanssen
- Despina Caldis as Vanna O'Neill
- Jonathan Watton as Geddes
- Clare Stone as Lisa Hanssen
- Jonathan Keltz as Greg Hanssen
- Reagan Pasternak as Beautiful Reporter
- Mary Jo Deschanel as Vivian O'Neill
- Chris Owens as Trunk Cataloguer

== Accuracy ==
The filmmakers fictionalized much of Eric O'Neill's story, as mentioned in the end credits. Among the major changes made for the film:

- The real O'Neill knew going in that Hanssen was the subject of a counterintelligence investigation. There was no cover story about sexual perversions and no dramatic meeting where O'Neill learned the truth.
- There was no extensive contact outside the office between O'Neill and Hanssen as portrayed in the film (the O'Neills visiting the Hanssens, the Hanssens dropping by O'Neill's apartment). However, Hanssen did take O'Neill to church.
- The scene in which Hanssen takes O'Neill out into the woods and drunkenly fires his pistol is fictional.
- Unlike in the movie, O'Neill never saw Hanssen after the arrest.
- While O'Neill did obtain Hanssen's PDA, he took it to FBI technicians to download rather than downloading it himself.
- As he was getting arrested, the real life Hanssen said "What took you so long?", whereas the film portrays him repeating the phrase "Guns won't be necessary."
- The real life Richard "Rich" Garces is Latin American.

=== Related content ===
O'Neill's memoir about the Hanssen case, Gray Day: My Undercover Mission to Expose America's First Cyber Spy, was published by Penguin Random House in Spring 2019.

== Reception ==
=== Critical response ===
The review aggregator Rotten Tomatoes gives the film an approval rating of 84% based on 176 reviews, with an average rating of 7.10/10. The site's critics consensus reads, "Powered by Chris Cooper's masterful performance, Breach is a tense and engaging portrayal of the FBI's infamous turncoat." Metacritic reported a weighted average score of 74 out of 100, based on 36 critics, indicating "generally favorable" reviews. Audiences polled by CinemaScore gave the film an average grade of "B+" on an A+ to F scale.

Manohla Dargis of The New York Times said, "One of the strengths of Breach, a thriller that manages to excite and unnerve despite our knowing the ending, is how well it captures the utter banality of this man and his world."

Peter Travers of Rolling Stone rated the film 3½ out of four stars, calling it a "steadily gripping hothouse of a thriller." He added, "Director and co-writer Billy Ray, who detailed the misconduct of journalist Stephen Glass at The New Republic in 2003's Shattered Glass ... proves himself a filmmaker of uncommon talent and ambition."

Ruthe Stein of the San Francisco Chronicle commented, "Breach suffers from lavishing so much attention on a relatively minor figure ... O'Neill, at least the way he's presented, isn't a particularly compelling character, and he is made less so by Phillippe's lackluster performance ... [The film] expends too much energy on a minor functionary, but it is still worth seeing for its fleeting looks into a heart of darkness."

Peter Rainer of The Christian Science Monitor named Breach the best film of the year. Richard Schickel of Time ranked it #6 and called Chris Cooper's performance "brilliant". Stephen Hunter of The Washington Post named it the ninth best film of 2007.

=== Box office ===
The film opened on 1,489 theaters screens in the US and earned $10.5 million in its opening weekend, ranking #6. It went on to gross $33.2 million domestically and $7.7 million in foreign markets, for a total worldwide box office of $41 million against its $23 million budget.
