= Chris Cooper =

American actor (born 1951)

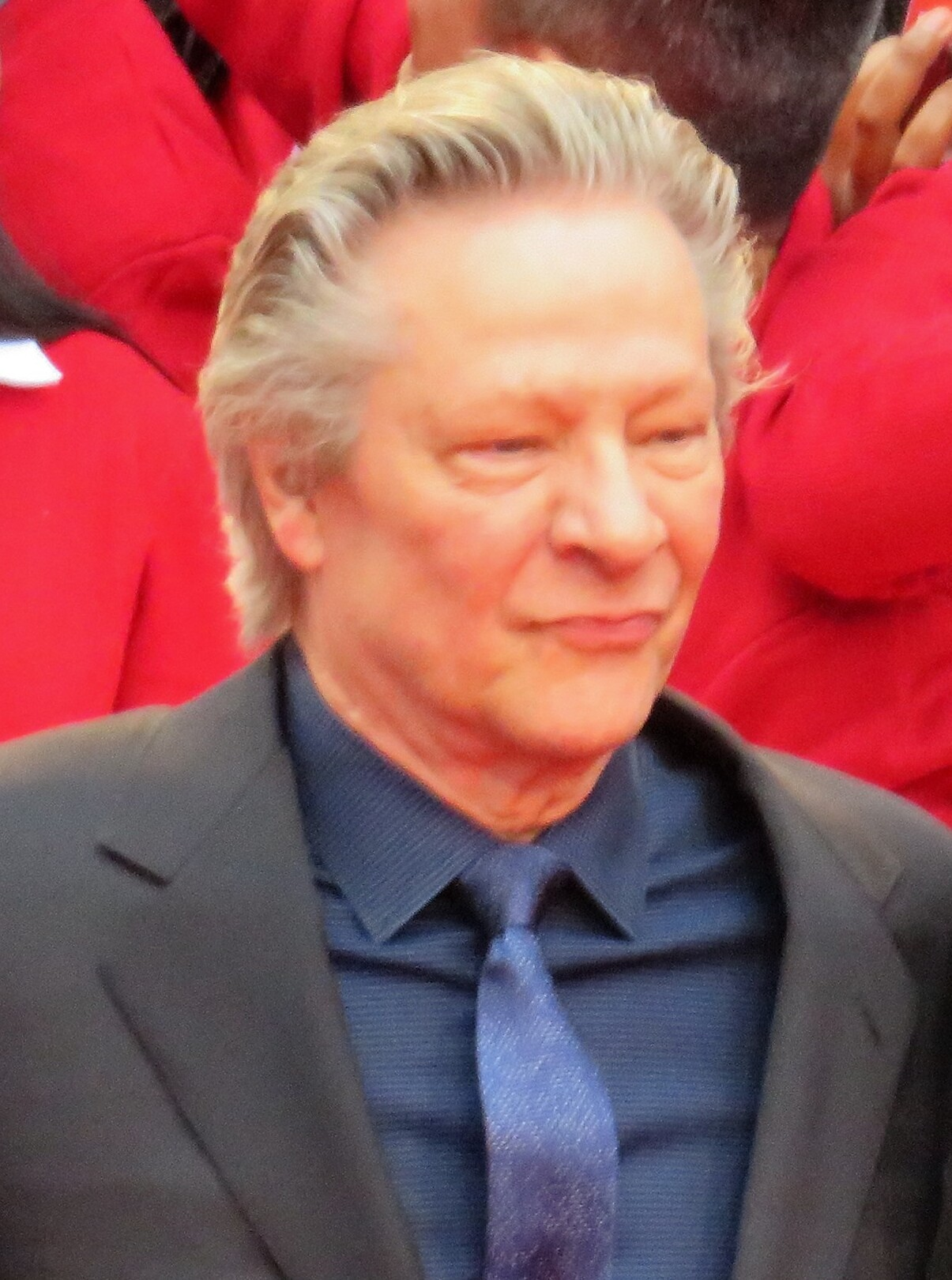
- Cooper in 2019
- Born: Christopher Walton Cooper; July 9, 1951 (age 75); Kansas City, Missouri, U.S.
- Education: University of Missouri
- Occupation: Actor
- Years active: 1977–present
- Spouse: Marianne Leone (m. 1983)
- Children: 1 (deceased)

Christopher Walton Cooper (born July 9, 1951) is an American actor. Having debuted as a stage actor, his television breakthrough was as Sheriff July Johnson in the acclaimed Western television miniseries Lonesome Dove (1989). He has appeared in major Hollywood films, including A Time to Kill (1996), October Sky (1999), American Beauty (1999), The Bourne Identity (2002), Adaptation (2002), Seabiscuit (2003), Capote (2005), Syriana (2005), The Kingdom (2007), Where the Wild Things Are (2009), The Town (2010), The Muppets (2011), Live by Night (2016), Cars 3 (2017), A Beautiful Day in the Neighborhood (2019), and Little Women (2019).

He also played a leading role in the historical political thriller Breach (2007), as FBI agent and traitor Robert Hanssen. He played Daniel Sloan in the 2012 political thriller The Company You Keep, and Norman Osborn in The Amazing Spider-Man 2 (2014). He portrayed Al Templeton on the 2016 Hulu miniseries 11.22.63. He is a frequent collaborator with director John Sayles, including on Matewan (1987), City of Hope (1991), Lone Star (1996), Silver City (2004) and Amigo (2010).

He won the Academy Award and Golden Globe Award for Best Supporting Actor for Adaptation. His other accolades include a Screen Actors Guild Award, and nominations for a BAFTA Award, a Primetime Emmy Award, an Independent Spirit Award, and three Satellite Awards. He was nominated for a Tony Award for Best Actor in a Play in 2017 for his performance in A Doll's House, Part 2.

== Early life ==
Cooper was born on July 9, 1951, in Kansas City, Missouri, the son of Charles and Mary Ann née Walton Cooper. He has an older brother, Chuck. His father was a United States Air Force physician and a cattleman, and his mother was a homemaker. Both of his parents were from Texas. Cooper grew up in the suburbs of Kansas City, and spent his summers at his family's cattle ranch, about fifteen miles west of Leavenworth, Kansas. The family moved to Las Vegas, Nevada, Phoenix, Arizona, and Houston, Texas as his father was redeployed. While attending Southwest High School in Kansas City, he worked for a local theatre company, building sets and using his carpentry background. He became the shop foreman for another repertory company after he graduated high school. He also considered helping his father raise cattle for a living. He served in the U.S. Coast Guard Reserve.

He attended the University of Missouri, where he enrolled in the theatre program, having initially majored in set design. He changed his major to acting during his sophomore year in order to address his "overpowering shyness." He recalled in a 1996 interview with The Philadelphia Inquirer, "I started going in and watching some shows at the theater department. I started taking theater classes and auditioned for plays. And once I got into it, it was pretty immediate. I really felt right, felt at home." Cooper also took dance classes at Stephens College.

He moved to New York City in 1976 after graduating from the University of Missouri. He shared a one-bedroom railroad flat with four other aspiring actors and dancers while living there. He supported himself by renovating apartments,, as well as in construction, as a janitor, and a chauffeur. He studied with Stella Adler and Wynn Handman at the same time. Prior to his film debut in Matewan (1987), Cooper had spent twelve years doing stage work with the Actors Theater of Louisville and the Seattle Repertory. He appeared in the London revival of Sweet Bird of Youth in 1985. He played Ty Cobb in Cobb in 1989 at the Yale Repertory Theatre.

== Career ==
Cooper's early performances include John Sayles' 1987 film Matewan; the 1989 CBS Western miniseries Lonesome Dove; the 1991 indie Western drama Thousand Pieces of Gold, and the 1992 ABC docudrama Bed of Lies, opposite Susan Dey.

His notable later performances include: Money Train, as a psychotic pyromaniac who terrifies toll booth operators; Lone Star, in a leading role as a Texas sheriff charged with solving a decades-old case; as Deputy Dwayne Looney in director Joel Schumacher's 1996 film A Time to Kill; as Frank Booker in 1998's The Horse Whisperer; and as a closeted homophobic Marine Corps colonel in American Beauty, a role that garnered him a Screen Actors Guild Award nomination for Best Supporting Actor. To get into character, Cooper said he "depended on a friend who'd fought in Vietnam. I asked him to go deep. What would this man have done? What would be on his walls? On his desk?"

He played Colonel Harry Burwell in The Patriot in 2000. He was nominated for another Screen Actors Guild Award, a BAFTA Award, and won an Academy Award for Best Supporting Actor and a Golden Globe Award in 2003 for playing the role of John Laroche in Adaptation. He also appeared in The Bourne Identity in 2002 as a ruthless CIA special ops director, a role he reprised (in flashbacks) in The Bourne Supremacy. He received another Screen Actors Guild Award nomination for his supporting role as racehorse trainer Tom Smith in 2003's Seabiscuit. In 2004, Cooper starred in Silver City, playing an inept Republican gubernatorial candidate, a character noted for similarities to U.S. President George W. Bush.

He appeared in three acclaimed films in 2005: Capote, Syriana, and Jarhead, which reunited him with American Beauty director Sam Mendes and October Sky actor Jake Gyllenhaal. He acted in the thriller Breach, playing real-life FBI agent and traitor Robert Hanssen. He commented that Breach was "the first studio film where they've considered me the lead [actor]". He appeared as a government agent in dangerous territory in the action thriller The Kingdom in 2007, and voiced the character Douglas in the film adaptation of Maurice Sendak's book, Where the Wild Things Are (2009).

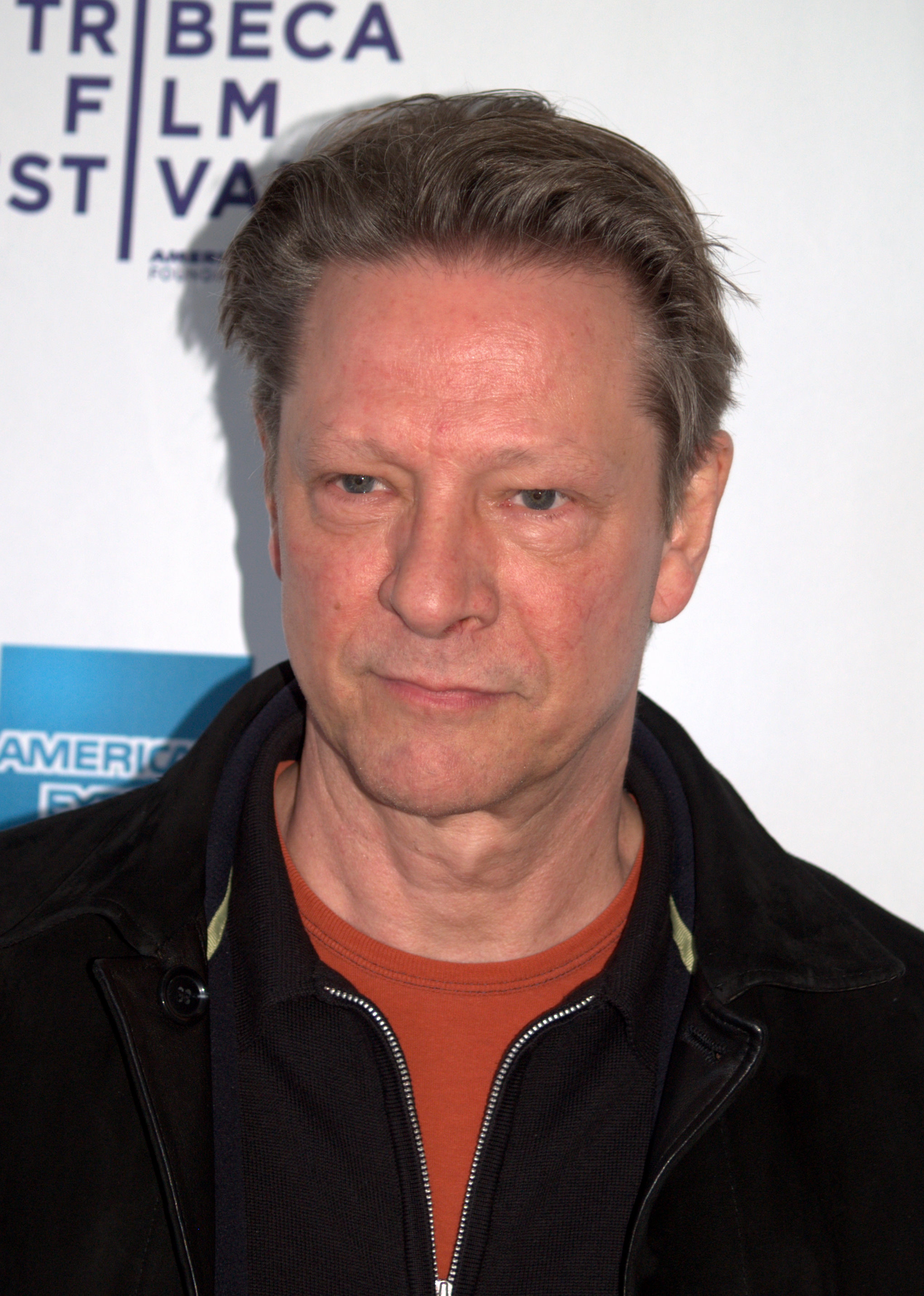
Cooper at the 2009 Tribeca Film Festival

At the 2010 Sundance Film Festival, Cooper appeared alongside Ben Affleck in The Company Men, early reviews of which praised Cooper's performance as "pitch-perfect". He appeared in The Muppets in 2011 as Tex Richman, the antagonistic oil tycoon who is unable to laugh. He performed the rap and dance number "Let's Talk About Me". He played Charles Aiken, Sr. in August: Osage County alongside an all-star cast that included Meryl Streep and Julia Roberts in 2013. He portrayed Norman Osborn in the 2014 film The Amazing Spider-Man 2. He appeared in an uncredited role in Ben Affleck's crime drama Live by Night, which was released in December 2016.

He and Laurie Metcalf starred in A Doll's House, Part 2 in 2017, a Broadway play by Lucas Hnath based on Henrik Ibsen's A Doll's House, for which he received a Tony Award nomination. Cooper played Nora Helmer's husband, Torvald. He starred in two acclaimed films in 2019: Marielle Heller's A Beautiful Day in the Neighborhood, with Tom Hanks, and Greta Gerwig's adaptation of Little Women with an ensemble cast featuring Saoirse Ronan, Emma Watson, Florence Pugh, Timothée Chalamet, Laura Dern, and Meryl Streep.

He served as an executive producer in 2024 for the documentary My Own Normal about Alexander Freeman, a filmmaker from Newton, Massachusetts who has cerebral palsy, following his journey of becoming a partner and father and confronting the pain of his parents' reaction. The documentary premiered at Independent Film Festival Boston.

== Personal life ==
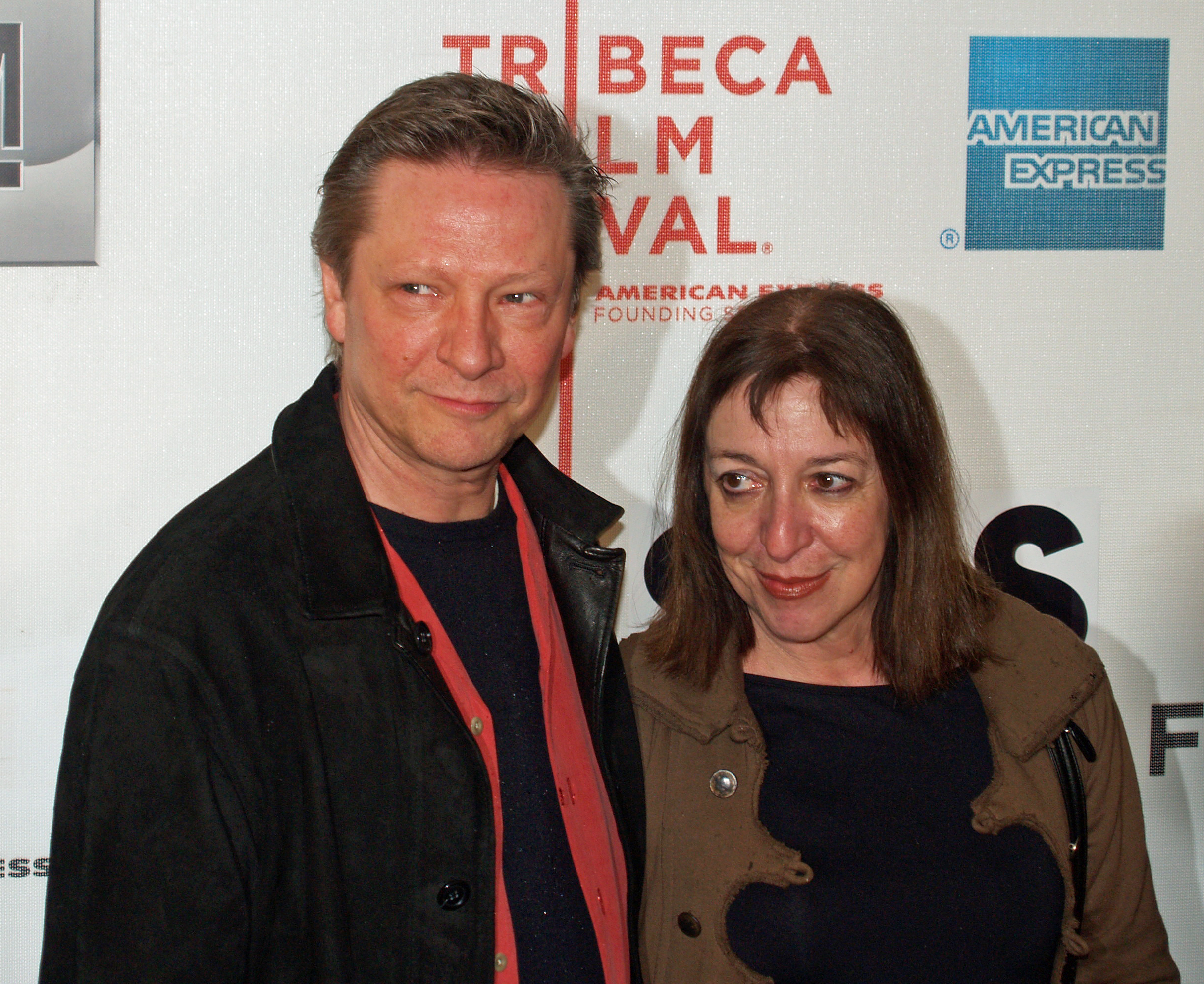
Cooper and wife Marianne Leone Cooper, April 2007

Cooper met his future wife, Marianne Leone, in 1979 at an acting class in New York City. On their first date, she helped him carry sheet rock up eight flights of stairs. He later said "that's when I knew this was the girl for me." They married in July 1983. Their son, Jesse Lanier Cooper, was born three months prematurely in October 1987. Three days after he was born, Jesse suffered a cerebral hemorrhage and developed cerebral palsy. Jesse was eventually mainstreamed into Silver Lake Regional High School, where he became an honor student.

Cooper recalled in a 2003 interview with The Morning Call, "[Jesse] is the best thing that ever happened to us. He's in a wheelchair and he communicates only by computer, but he's taught me so much because he's just so incredibly focused. Now he's in a regular school, which we fought to get him into. He's an honors student, and he's doing great." Jesse suffered a sudden unexpected death in epilepsy on January 3, 2005. A memorial fund was set up in his name, the Jesse Cooper Foundation. Cooper has said that the death of his son has helped him understand several characters he played, such as Charles Aiken in August: Osage County (2013) and Phil Eastwood in Demolition (2015).

He has lived in Kingston, Massachusetts, as of 2003. Cooper received an honorary doctorate from the University of Massachusetts Lowell in May 2016. He and his wife Marianne adopted rescue dogs.

== Filmography ==
=== Film ===
Year	Title	Role	Notes
1987	Matewan	Joe Kenehan	
1991	Guilty by Suspicion	Larry Nolan	
1991	Thousand Pieces of Gold	Charlie	
1991	City of Hope	Riggs	
1993	This Boy's Life	Roy	
1995	Pharaoh's Army	Captain John Hull Abston	
1995	Money Train	Terry the "Torch" Edwards	
1996	Boys	John Baker	
1996	Lone Star	Sheriff Sam Deeds	Nominated–Independent Spirit Award for Best Male Lead
1996	A Time to Kill	Deputy Dwayne Powell Looney	
1998	Great Expectations	Joe Coleman	
1998	The Horse Whisperer	Frank Booker	
1999	The 24 Hour Woman	Ron Hacksby	
1999	October Sky	John Hickam	
1999	American Beauty	Colonel Frank Fitts, USMC	Online Film Critics Society Award for Best Cast; Screen Actors Guild Award for Outstanding Performance by a Cast in a Motion Picture; Nominated–Screen Actors Guild Award for Outstanding Performance by a Male Actor in a Supporting Role
2000	Me, Myself & Irene	Lieutenant Gerke	
2000	The Patriot	Colonel Harry Burwell	
2002	Interstate 60	Bob Cody	
2002	The Bourne Identity	Alexander Conklin	
2002	The Ring	Child Murderer	Deleted role
2002	Adaptation	John Laroche	Academy Award for Best Supporting Actor; Broadcast Film Critics Association Award for Best Supporting Actor; Dallas-Fort Worth Film Critics Association Award for Best Supporting Actor; Florida Film Critics Circle Award for Best Supporting Actor; Golden Globe Award for Best Supporting Actor – Motion Picture; Kansas City Film Critics Circle Award for Best Supporting Actor; Los Angeles Film Critics Association Award for Best Supporting Actor; National Board of Review Award for Best Supporting Actor; San Diego Film Critics Society Award for Best Supporting Actor; San Francisco Film Critics Circle Award for Best Supporting Actor; Toronto Film Critics Association Award for Best Supporting Actor; Vancouver Film Critics Circle Award for Best Supporting Actor; Village Voice Film Poll for Best Supporting Performance; Washington D.C. Area Film Critics Association Award for Best Supporting Actor; Nominated–BAFTA Award for Best Actor in a Supporting Role; Nominated–Chicago Film Critics Association Award for Best Supporting Actor; Nominated–National Society of Film Critics Award for Best Supporting Actor; Nominated–New York Film Critics Circle Award for Best Supporting Actor; Nominated–Online Film Critics Society Award for Best Cast; Nominated–Online Film Critics Society Award for Best Supporting Actor; Nominated–Satellite Award for Best Supporting Actor – Motion Picture; Nominated–Screen Actors Guild Award for Outstanding Performance by a Cast in a Motion Picture; Nominated–Screen Actors Guild Award for Outstanding Performance by a Male Actor in a Supporting Role
2003	Seabiscuit	Tom Smith	Nominated–Screen Actors Guild Award for Outstanding Performance by a Male Actor in a Supporting Role; Nominated–Screen Actors Guild Award for Outstanding Performance by a Cast in a Motion Picture
2004	Silver City	Richard 'Dicky' Pilager	
2004	The Bourne Supremacy	Alexander Conklin	Uncredited
2005	Capote	Alvin Dewey	Nominated–Satellite Award for Best Supporting Actor – Motion Picture; Nominated–Screen Actors Guild Award for Outstanding Performance by a Cast in a Motion Picture
2005	Jarhead	Lieutenant Colonel Kazinski	
2005	Syriana	Jimmy Pope	
2007	Breach	Robert Hanssen	
2007	The Kingdom	FBI Agent Grant Sykes	
2007	Married Life	Harry Allen	
2008	New York, I Love You	Alex Simmons	
2008	Extreme Movie	FBI Agent Mike	
2009	Where the Wild Things Are	Douglas (voice)	
2010	The Tempest	Antonio	
2010	The Company Men	Phil Woodward	Nominated–Dallas-Fort Worth Film Critics Association Award for Best Supporting Actor
2010	Remember Me	Neil Craig	
2010	Amigo	Colonel Hardacre	
2010	The Town	Stephen MacRay	National Board of Review Award for Best Cast; Washington D.C. Area Film Critics Association Award for Best Ensemble; Nominated–Broadcast Film Critics Association Award for Best Cast
2011	The Muppets	Tex Richman	
2012	The Company You Keep	Daniel Sloan	
2013	August: Osage County	Charles Aiken	AARP Annual Movies for Grownups Award for Best Supporting Actor; Capri Ensemble Cast Award; Hollywood Film Award for Ensemble of the Year; Nominated–Screen Actors Guild Award for Outstanding Performance by a Cast in a Motion Picture
2014	The Amazing Spider-Man 2	Norman Osborn	Uncredited cameo
2015	Fastball	Clifford Blankenship (voice)	Documentary
2015	Demolition	Phil Eastwood	
2015	Coming Through the Rye	J. D. Salinger	
2016	Live by Night	Irving Figgis	
2017	Cars 3	Smokey (voice)	
2018	Intelligent Lives	Narrator	
2019	A Beautiful Day in the Neighborhood	Jerry Vogel	
2019	Little Women	Mr. Laurence	
2019	Henrietta Bulkowski	Danny Wilcox (voice)	Short film
2020	Irresistible	Marine Colonel Jack Hastings	
2021	With/In: Volume 2		Segment: "Nuts"; also director
2023	Boston Strangler	Jack MacLaine	
2024	My Own Normal		Documentary, executive producer
2025	The History of Sound	Dr. Lionel Worthing	
2025	Everything's Going to Be Great	Walter	
2025	True Value	Narrator	Documentary

=== Television ===
Year	Title	Role	Notes
1987	The Equalizer	Michael	Episode: "The Rehearsal"
1988	American Playhouse	Louis Halladay	Episode: "Journey Into Genius"
1988	Miami Vice	Jimmy Yagovitch	Episode: "Mirror Image"
1989	Lonesome Dove	July Johnson	Miniseries
1990	Lifestories	Mr. Hawkins	Episode: "The Hawkins Family"
1990	To the Moon, Alice	Frank Wiliker	Television film
1991	In Broad Daylight	Jack Wilson	Television film
1991	Darrow	Eugene V. Debs	Television film
1992	Bed of Lies	Price Daniel Jr.	Television film
1992	Ned Blessing: The True Story of My Life	Anthony Blessing	Television film
1994	One More Mountain	James Reed	Television film
1996	Law & Order	Roy Payne	Episode: "Blood Libel"
1997	Breast Men	Dr. William Larson	Television film
2003	My House in Umbria	Thomas Riversmith	Television film Nominated–Primetime Emmy Award for Outstanding Supporting Actor – Miniseries or a Movie; Nominated–Satellite Award for Best Supporting Actor – Series, Miniseries or Television Film
2008	American Experience	Walt Whitman (voice)	Episode: "Walt Whitman"
2009	American Experience	Narrator (voice)	Episode: "The Assassination of Abraham Lincoln"
2010	Bloom: The Plight of Lake Champlain	Narrator (voice)	Documentary
2012	Bloom: The Emergence of Ecological Design	Narrator (voice)	Documentary
2016	11.22.63	Al Templeton	Miniseries
2020	Homecoming	Leonard Geist	6 episodes (season 2)

=== Video games ===
Year	Title	Voice role	Notes
2017	Cars 3: Driven to Win	Smokey	

== Stage ==
Year	Title	Role	Notes
1980	Of the Fields, Lately	Ben Mercer	Broadway debut
2017	A Doll's House, Part 2	Torvald Helmer	Nominated–Tony Award for Best Actor in a Play

== Awards and nominations ==
Year	Award	Category	Nominated work	Result	Ref.
2000	Screen Actors Guild Awards	Outstanding Performance by a Male Actor in a Supporting Role	American Beauty	Nominated	
2000	Screen Actors Guild Awards	Outstanding Performance by a Cast in a Motion Picture	American Beauty	Won	
2003	Academy Awards	Best Supporting Actor	Adaptation	Won	
2003	Golden Globe Awards	Best Supporting Actor	Adaptation	Won	
2003	BAFTA Film Awards	Best Actor in a Supporting Role	Adaptation	Nominated	
2003	Screen Actors Guild Awards	Outstanding Performance by a Male Actor in a Supporting Role	Adaptation	Nominated	
2003	Screen Actors Guild Awards	Outstanding Performance by a Cast in a Motion Picture	Adaptation	Nominated	
2003	Primetime Emmy Awards	Outstanding Supporting Actor in a Limited Series or Movie	My House in Umbria	Nominated	
2004	Screen Actors Guild Awards	Outstanding Performance by a Male Actor in a Supporting Role	Seabiscuit	Nominated	
2004	Screen Actors Guild Awards	Outstanding Performance by a Cast in a Motion Picture	Seabiscuit	Nominated	
2006	Screen Actors Guild Awards	Outstanding Performance by a Cast in a Motion Picture	Capote	Nominated	
2014	Screen Actors Guild Awards	Outstanding Performance by a Cast in a Motion Picture	August: Osage County	Nominated	
2017	Tony Awards	Best Actor in a Play	A Doll's House, Part 2	Nominated	
