= Spy: The Inside Story of How the FBI's Robert Hanssen Betrayed America =

Book by David Wise

Spy
- Author: David Wise
- Language: English
- Genre: Non fiction
- Published: 2002
- Publication place: America

Spy: The Inside Story of How the FBI's Robert Hanssen Betrayed America is a 2002 non-fiction book by David Wise. It is about the Robert Hanssen case.

Publishers Weekly stated that the author "covers aspects of the case that have been largely neglected to date" due to the information from people involved in the case and how Wise placed the central figure, Hanssen, in context. Kirkus Reviews stated that the book is "largely narrative" that lacks the analysis present in David Wise's other works.

The CIA had asked Wise to not state the name of a CIA employee who was erroneously accused of spying before Hanssen; Wise stated that the agency gave him "intense pressure" but he refused to do so. Instead he criticized the agency in a subsequent The New York Times op-ed article.

== Reception ==
Kirkus concluded that it is "a first-rate true-crime story" and that the author's writing was done "well and capably".

Publishers Weekly stated that the book is "so far, the definitive account of" the case and that it was "Well researched and ably written".

CIA spokesperson Bill Harlow criticized the book, stating it was "otherwise unremarkable" and that it went "on the market with a resounding thud".

== See also ==
- Gray Day - Memoir by Eric O'Neill, who gathered evidence against Hanssen
