= Eric O'Neill =

Security consultant, former FBI counter-espionage operative (born 1973)

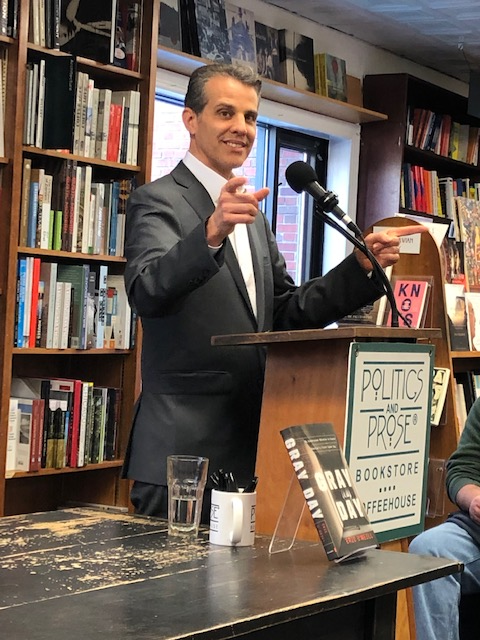
- O'Neill speaking about his book, Gray Day, at Politics and Prose Bookstore in Washington, D.C., March 2019
- Born: March 3, 1973 (age 53)
- Education: Auburn University (BA); George Washington University (JD)
- Occupations: Public speaker; security expert; lawyer
- Employer: Global Communities
- Known for: Robert Hanssen investigation
- Spouse: Juliana O'Neill
- Website: ericoneill.net

Eric Michael O'Neill (born March 3, 1973) is an American former FBI counter-terrorism and counterintelligence operative. He worked as an investigative specialist with the Special Surveillance Group (SSG) and played a major role in the arrest, conviction, and imprisonment of FBI agent Robert Hanssen for spying on behalf of the Soviet Union and later Russia. His book written about this experience, Gray Day: My Undercover Mission to Expose America's First Cyber Spy, was published in spring 2019. He is a public speaker and security expert who lectures internationally about espionage and national security, cybersecurity, fraud, corporate diligence and defense, hacking, and other topics.

== Early life ==
O'Neill graduated from Gonzaga College High School in Washington, D.C., in 1991. He earned a BA, with honors, in political science and psychology from Auburn University in 1995, where he was a member of the Beta Zeta chapter of the Theta Xi fraternity.

== Career ==
=== FBI ===
After a career as a counterintelligence and counter-terrorism field operative, O'Neill was assigned to report to Hanssen in the newly established Information Assurance Section. His true role was to learn as much as possible about what information Hanssen had divulged to the Soviet Union and Russia. Ultimately, investigators made a dramatic move to obtain a "smoking gun". While others briefly disrupted Hanssen's routine and confidence, maneuvering him into relaxing his rigid control of his Palm Pilot, O'Neill, under intense time pressure, obtained the Palm Pilot, took it to FBI technical staff to download its encrypted contents, and returned it, apparently undetected. O'Neill notes that he could not recall which pocket he had taken the device from, and has speculated that had Hanssen detected the disturbance of his device, he would have realized that all hope of continued freedom was lost and might have shot O'Neill dead on the spot.

Hanssen was arrested on February 18, 2001, at Foxstone Park near his home in Vienna, Virginia, charged with selling American secrets to Russia for $1.4 million in cash and diamonds over a 22-year period. O'Neill's subterfuge had apparently deceived Hanssen, as part of the dead drop contained an evaluation of O'Neill's possibly replacing Hanssen as a mole when he retired. On 6 July 2001, Hanssen pleaded guilty to 15 counts of espionage. Hanssen was sentenced to life in prison. His espionage has been described as "possibly the worst intelligence disaster in US history."

=== Post-FBI ===
Following the Hanssen case, O'Neill decided to leave the FBI in order to focus on law school. O'Neill earned a JD with honors from the George Washington University Law School in 2003. He has been admitted to the bar in Maryland and in the District of Columbia. After graduating from law school, O'Neill joined DLA Piper US LLP as a Senior Associate in the Government Contracts Group. In December 2008, O'Neill left DLA Piper and accepted a position as General Counsel of Global Communities, formerly CHF International, a global humanitarian relief non-profit organization.

In February 2009, O'Neill co-founded The Georgetown Group, an investigative and risk management company.

In July 2013, O'Neill co-founded the Schiltron Group, a supply chain assurance and critical infrastructure protection company.

On March 16, 2016, O'Neill was named National Security Strategist for Carbon Black, an endpoint security company.

On October 8, 2019, Carbon Black was acquired by VMware, a leading innovator in enterprise software where O'Neill continues to serve as National Security Strategist.

== Media portrayals ==
O'Neill is portrayed by Ryan Phillippe in the 2007 thriller Breach, which depicts O'Neill's role in the investigation and capture of Hanssen. A feature-length commentary track on the DVD features O'Neill with director Billy Ray. O'Neill expands on the film, offering additional background and details, as well as noting where actual events were changed on the film for dramatic purposes.

O'Neill's memoir about the Hanssen case, Gray Day: My Undercover Mission to Expose America's First Cyber Spy, was published by Penguin Random House in spring 2019.

O'Neill is featured in episode 4 of Smithsonian Channel's series Spy Wars, which aired at the end of 2019 and was narrated by Damian Lewis. O'Neill is also featured in the seventh episode of The History Channel series America's Book of Secrets.
