= John Dion =

American lawyer

John Dion is an American lawyer who spent 31 years as an official in the United States Department of Justice.

Dion was, for many years, the head of the Justice Department's counter-espionage section. This position has to be approved by the Office of Personnel Management. Dion retired on October 31, 2013, replaced by Katie Kedian.

According to Elaine Shannon and Ann Blackman, in The Spy Next Door, Dion was the first Justice Department official contacted after FBI agent Robert Philip Hanssen was discovered to have been an enemy spy. According to Rowan Scarborough, in Sabotage: America's Enemies within the CIA, Dion was the first Justice Department official contacted after it was learned that senior White House aides had revealed to the press that Valerie Plame was a covert CIA case officer.
