= Server-based gaming =

Server-based gaming, or SBG, is a solution employed by video lotteries and casinos to operate Video Lottery Terminals (VLTs) and Electronic Gaming Machines (EGMs), the latter commonly referred to as slot machines. An SBG system includes a central system and gaming terminals which connect to the central system. SBG systems may be operated locally over a LAN or span large geographical areas, even entire nations, over a WAN, such as the Internet.

SBG systems differentiate themselves from other types of video lottery and casino systems by centralizing both game logic and Random number generation. Game terminals in an SBG system must per definition be authorized and connected to the central system in order to function, something that is not true for systems where all critical game components reside locally in the terminal.

== History ==
SBG shares its roots with Server Supported Gaming (SSG). Both types of systems are examples of server centric gaming, which means that they share some similarities. Server centric gaming combines classic video poker and video lottery with features of a modern client-server computer network. Compared to traditional standalone slot machines, SBG and SSG systems facilitate automated remote game and configuration management for example.

SBG further builds upon the server centric gaming concept with technology and design principles from thin client computing and online gaming, thus making it fundamentally different from SSG, which employs thick client game terminals that have more in common with standalone terminals. The development of SBG has been driven by technological advancements and the benefits made possible thereof.

"For example, a system described in U.S. Pat. No. 6,409,602 is known as a casino game system of this sort. This system comprises a server and a plurality of clients, and the server can execute a plurality of game programs. Each client can access the plurality of game programs that the server executes, and a game image created by the accessed game program is displayed on a display unit of the client. Thereafter, a player can play a game from the game program being executed by the server by performing the game operation to the client. A typical conventional casino game system comprises a plurality of independent game devices, and each game device independently executes a game program. According to the system described in U.S. Pat. No. 6,409,602, most of the functions that each game device in this typical conventional casino game system is equipped with can be centralized in the server. In this way, each client only needs to be equipped with minimum functions, i.e. user interfaces (display unit and operation accepting unit) and a communication function that enables communication with the server. This dramatically reduces the costs for both hardware and software in the entire casino game system." "CASINO GAME SYSTEM AND CASINO GAME TERMINAL THAT CAN BE USED THEREIN", United States Patent Application 20070213134, "Background of the Invention" section.

== Benefits ==
SBG represents a paradigm shift from both standalone terminals and SSG because game logic and RNG reside on the server in an SBG system. Frequently mentioned benefits of SBG include:

- Multi-channel gaming, which allows players to access games on other platforms as well, such as mobile phones for example.
- Linked gaming content, support for wide area multiplayer and progressive jackpots.
- Instant access to any game available in an operator's catalogue, enabling a long tail effect. This can be compared to standalone gaming terminals, which require games to be installed on location by changing a computer chip (or EPROM), or SSG, which requires that the complete game is downloaded before it can be played.
- Personalization through the use of player profiles.
- Lower hardware, software and maintenance costs for game terminals, due to their thin client nature.
- Real-time monitoring of game terminal status and game transactions.
- Higher security, since the RNG and game logic can't be manipulated at individual game terminals.
- More control – software, hardware and peripherals can be disabled if digital signature verification fails. Compared to standalone and SSG terminals, unauthorized SBG terminals can't be operated since they rely on the central system in order to function.
- Responsible gaming features that require advanced monitoring capabilities.
- Reduced risk of piracy, since only the client components of games are stored locally in game terminals.

== Certification and legality ==
GLI (Gaming Laboratories International) has created a standard (GLI #21) which includes requirements and definitions for Server Centric Gaming systems, referred to as Client-Server Systems (CSS). GLI differentiates between Server Based Gaming Systems (SBGS) and Server Supported Gaming Systems (SSGS). GLI defines SBGS as “The combination of a server and client terminals in which the entire or integral portion of game content resides on the server.” SSGS is defined as “The combination of a server and client terminal(s) which together allow the transfer of the entire control program and game content to the client terminal(s)…”

GLI certifies SBG and SSG systems according to the GLI #21 standard, something which is a requirement by many operators and jurisdictions for them to consider and allow such systems. Currently, SBG systems are allowed in several countries and US states, both through GLI certification and local legislation.

== SBG systems in operation ==
There are several server centric systems in production all over the world. Most of these are SSG systems, though they are often referred to as SBG systems. The video lottery system of the Norwegian state owned lottery Norsk Tipping is an example of an actual SBG system currently in operation.

== See also ==
- Server Supported Gaming
- Video lottery terminals
- Slot machine
- Casino game
