= George S. Patton's speech to the Third Army =

Motivational speeches

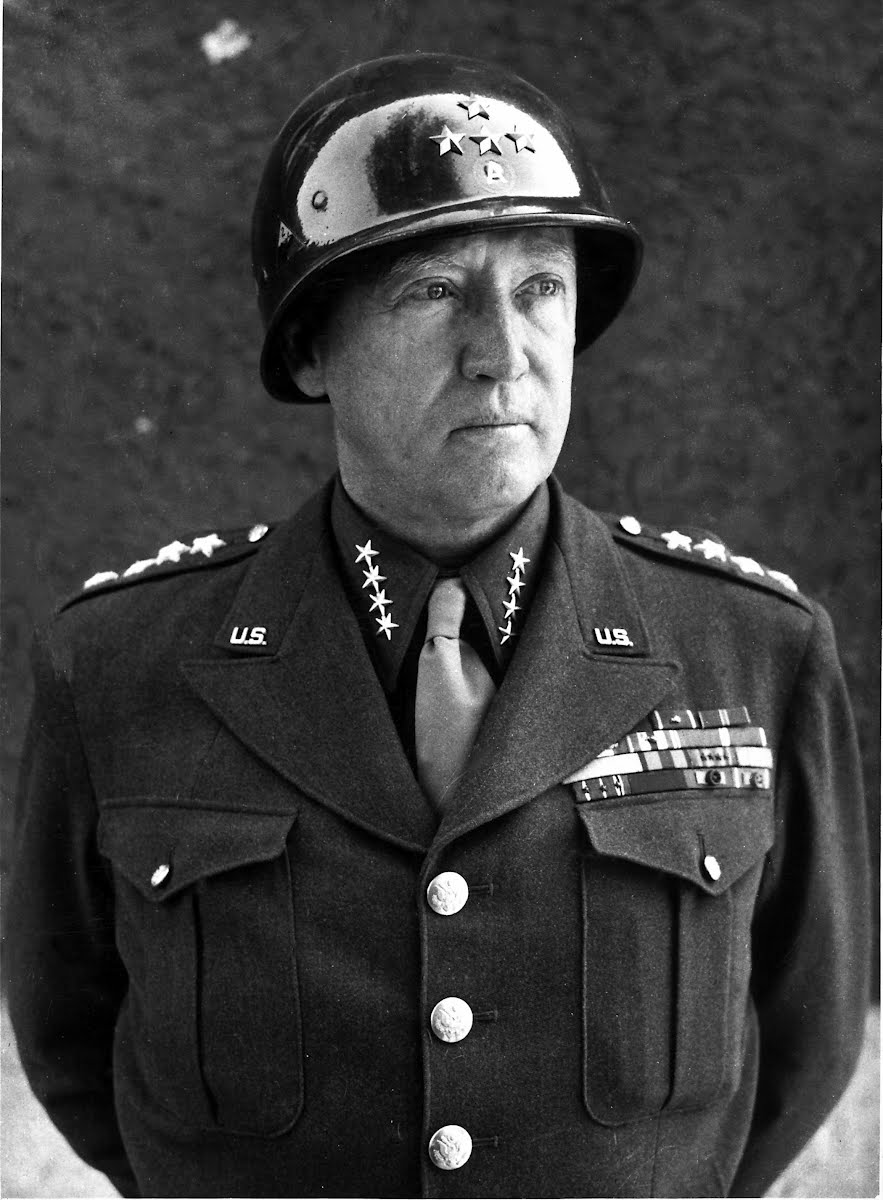
Patton in 1943

The American general George S. Patton gave a series of speeches to troops of the United States Third Army in 1944, before the Allied invasion of France during World War II. The speeches were intended to motivate the inexperienced Third Army for impending combat.

Patton urged his soldiers to do their duty regardless of personal fear, and he exhorted them to aggressiveness and constant offensive action. His profanity-laced speaking was viewed as unprofessional by some officers but the speech resounded well with his men. Some historians have called the oration one of the greatest motivational speeches of all time.

== Background ==
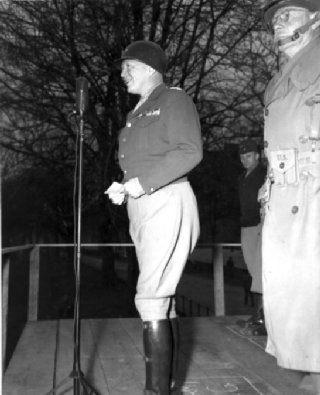
Patton delivers an address in Northern Ireland, April 1944

In June 1944, Lieutenant General George S. Patton was given command of the Third United States Army, a field army newly arrived in the United Kingdom and composed largely of inexperienced troops. Patton's job had been to train the Third Army to prepare it for the upcoming Allied invasion of France, where it would join in the breakout into Brittany seven weeks after the amphibious landing at Normandy.

By 1944, Patton had been established as a highly effective and successful leader, noted for his ability to inspire his men with charismatic speeches, which he delivered from memory because of a lifelong trouble with reading. Patton deliberately cultivated a flashy image in the belief as this would inspire his troops. He carried a trademark ivory-handled Smith & Wesson Model 27 .357 Magnum. He was usually seen wearing a polished helmet, riding pants, and high cavalry boots. His jeep had oversized rank placards on the front and back, as well as a klaxon horn which would loudly announce his approach from afar. Patton was an effective combat commander, having rehabilitated II Corps during the North African campaign and then led the Seventh United States Army through the invasion of Sicily during 1943, at times personally appearing to his troops in the middle of battle in hopes of inspiring them. Patton's army had beaten General Bernard Montgomery to Messina which gained him considerable fame, although the infamous slapping incident sidelined his career for several months thereafter.

At the time of the speeches, Patton was attempting to keep a low profile among the press, as he had been ordered to by General Dwight Eisenhower. Patton was made a central figure in an elaborate phantom army deception scheme, and the Germans believed he was in Dover preparing the—fictitious—First United States Army Group for an invasion of the Pas de Calais. Patton frequently kept his face in a scowl he referred to as his "war face". He would arrive in a Mercedes and deliver his remarks on a raised platform surrounded by a very large audience seated around the platform and on surrounding hills. Each address was delivered to a major general-led division-sized force of 15,000 or more men.

== Speech ==
=== Delivery and style ===
Patton began delivering speeches to his troops in the United Kingdom in February 1944. The extent of his giving the particular speech that became famous is unclear, with different sources saying it had taken this form by March, or around early May, or in late May. The number of speeches given is also not clear, with one source saying four to six, and others suggesting that every unit in the Third Army heard an instance. The most famous and well known of the speeches occurred on 5 June 1944, the day before D-Day. Though he was unaware of the actual date for the beginning of the invasion of Europe (as the Third Army was not part of the initial landing force), Patton used the speech as a motivational device to excite the men under his command and prevent them from losing their nerve. Patton delivered the speech without notes, and so though it was substantially the same at each occurrence, the order of some of its parts varied. One notable difference occurred in the speech he delivered on 31 May 1944, while addressing the U.S. 6th Armored Division, when he began with a remark that would later be among his most famous:

No bastard ever won a war by dying for his country. He won it by making the other poor dumb bastard die for his country.

Patton's words were later written down by a number of troops who witnessed his remarks, and so a number of iterations exist with differences in wording. Historian Terry Brighton constructed a full speech from a number of soldiers who recounted the speech in their memoirs, including Gilbert R. Cook, Hobart R. Gay, and other junior soldiers. Patton only wrote briefly of his orations in his diary, noting, "as in all of my talks, I stressed fighting and killing." The speech later became so popular that it was called simply "Patton's speech" or "The speech" when referencing the general.

=== Transcript ===
Be seated.

Men, all this stuff you hear about America not wanting to fight, wanting to stay out of the war, is a lot of horse dung. Americans love to fight. All real Americans love the sting and clash of battle. When you were kids, you all admired the champion marble shooter, the fastest runner, the big-league ball players and the toughest boxers. Americans love a winner and will not tolerate a loser. Americans play to win all the time. I wouldn't give a hoot in hell for a man who lost, and laughed. That's why Americans have never lost and will never lose a war. The very thought of losing is hateful to America. Battle is the most significant competition in which a man can indulge. It brings out all that is best and it removes all that is base.

You are not all going to die. Only two percent of you right here today would be killed in a major battle. Every man is scared in his first action. If he says he's not, he's a goddamn liar. But the real hero is the man who fights even though he's scared. Some men will get over their fright in a minute under fire, some take an hour, and for some it takes days. But the real man never lets his fear of death overpower his honor, his sense of duty to his country, and his innate manhood.

All through your army career you men have bitched about what you call 'this chicken-shit drilling.' That is all for a purpose—to ensure instant obedience to orders and to create constant alertness. This must be bred into every soldier. I don't give a fuck for a man who is not always on his toes. But the drilling has made veterans of all you men. You are ready! A man has to be alert all the time if he expects to keep on breathing. If not, some German son-of-a-bitch will sneak up behind him and beat him to death with a sock full of shit. There are four hundred neatly marked graves in Sicily, all because one man went to sleep on the job—but they are German graves, because we caught the bastard asleep before his officer did.

An army is a team. It lives, eats, sleeps, and fights as a team. This individual hero stuff is bullshit. The bilious bastards who write that stuff for the Saturday Evening Post don't know any more about real battle than they do about fucking. Now we have the finest food and equipment, the best spirit and the best men in the world. You know, by God, I actually pity these poor bastards we're going up against, by God I do.

All the real heroes are not storybook combat fighters. Every single man in the army plays a vital role. So don't ever let up. Don't ever think that your job is unimportant. What if every truck driver decided that he didn't like the whine of the shells and turned yellow and jumped headlong into a ditch? That cowardly bastard could say to himself, 'Hell, they won't miss me, just one man in thousands.' What if every man said that? Where in the hell would we be then? No, thank God, Americans don't say that. Every man does his job. Every man is important. The ordnance men are needed to supply the guns, the quartermaster is needed to bring up the food and clothes for us because where we are going there isn't a hell of a lot to steal. Every last damn man in the mess hall, even the one who boils the water to keep us from getting the GI shits, has a job to do.

Each man must think not only of himself, but think of his buddy fighting alongside him. We don't want yellow cowards in the army. They should be killed off like flies. If not, they will go back home after the war, goddamn cowards, and breed more cowards. The brave men will breed more brave men. Kill off the goddamn cowards and we'll have a nation of brave men.

One of the bravest men I saw in the African campaign was on a telegraph pole in the midst of furious fire while we were moving toward Tunis. I stopped and asked him what the hell he was doing up there. He answered, 'Fixing the wire, sir.' 'Isn't it a little unhealthy up there right now?' I asked. 'Yes sir, but this goddamn wire has got to be fixed.' I asked, 'Don't those planes strafing the road bother you?' And he answered, 'No sir, but you sure as hell do.' Now, there was a real soldier. A real man. A man who devoted all he had to his duty, no matter how great the odds, no matter how seemingly insignificant his duty appeared at the time.

And you should have seen the trucks on the road to Gabès. Those drivers were magnificent. All day and all night they crawled along those son-of-a-bitch roads, never stopping, never deviating from their course with shells bursting all around them. Many of the men drove over 40 consecutive hours. We got through on good old American guts. These were not combat men. But they were soldiers with a job to do. They were part of a team. Without them the fight would have been lost.

Sure, we all want to go home. We want to get this war over with. But you can't win a war lying down. The quickest way to get it over with is to get the bastards who started it. We want to get the hell over there and clean the goddamn thing up, and then get at those purple-pissing Japs. (Note: Gentian violet was used in the treatment of venereal disease and would discolor the urine, insinuating that all the enemy soldiers were disease-ridden.) The quicker they are whipped, the quicker we go home. The shortest way home is through Berlin and Tokyo. So keep moving. And when we get to Berlin, I am personally going to shoot that paper-hanging son-of-a-bitch Hitler.

When a man is lying in a shell hole, if he just stays there all day, a Boche will get him eventually. The hell with that. My men don't dig foxholes. Foxholes only slow up an offensive. Keep moving. We'll win this war, but we'll win it only by fighting and showing the Germans that we've got more guts than they have or ever will have. We're not just going to shoot the bastards, we're going to rip out their living goddamned guts and use them to grease the treads of our tanks. We're going to murder those lousy Hun cocksuckers by the bushel-fucking-basket.

Some of you men are wondering whether or not you'll chicken out under fire. Don't worry about it. I can assure you that you'll all do your duty. War is a bloody business, a killing business. The Nazis are the enemy. Wade into them, spill their blood or they will spill yours. Shoot them in the guts. Rip open their belly. When shells are hitting all around you and you wipe the dirt from your face and you realize that it's not dirt, it's the blood and guts of what was once your best friend, you'll know what to do.

I don't want any messages saying 'I'm holding my position.' We're not holding a goddamned thing. We're advancing constantly and we're not interested in holding anything except the enemy's balls. We're going to hold him by his balls and we're going to kick him in the ass; twist his balls and kick the living shit out of him all the time. Our plan of operation is to advance and keep on advancing. We're going to go through the enemy like shit through a tinhorn.

There will be some complaints that we're pushing our people too hard. I don't give a damn about such complaints. I believe that an ounce of sweat will save a gallon of blood. The harder we push, the more Germans we kill. The more Germans we kill, the fewer of our men will be killed. Pushing harder means fewer casualties. I want you all to remember that. My men don't surrender. I don't want to hear of any soldier under my command being captured unless he is hit. Even if you are hit, you can still fight. That's not just bullshit either. I want men like the lieutenant in Libya who, with a Luger against his chest, swept aside the gun with his hand, jerked his helmet off with the other and busted the hell out of the Boche with the helmet. Then he picked up the gun and he killed another German. All this time the man had a bullet through his lung. That's a man for you!

Don't forget, you don't know I'm here at all. No word of that fact is to be mentioned in any letters. The world is not supposed to know what the hell they did with me. I'm not supposed to be commanding this army. I'm not even supposed to be in England. Let the first bastards to find out be the goddamned Germans. Some day, I want them to rise up on their piss-soaked hind legs and howl 'Ach! It's the goddamned Third Army and that son-of-a-bitch Patton again!'

Then there's one thing you men will be able to say when this war is over and you get back home. Thirty years from now when you're sitting by your fireside with your grandson on your knee and he asks, 'What did you do in the great World War Two?' You won't have to cough and say, 'Well, your granddaddy shoveled shit in Louisiana.' No sir, you can look him straight in the eye and say 'Son, your granddaddy rode with the great Third Army and a son-of-a-goddamned-bitch named George Patton!'

All right, you sons of bitches. You know how I feel. I'll be proud to lead you wonderful guys in battle anytime, anywhere. That's all.

=== Impact ===
The troops under Patton's command received the speech well. The general's strong reputation caused considerable excitement among his men, and they listened intently, in absolute silence, as he spoke. A majority indicated they enjoyed Patton's speaking style. As one officer recounted of the end of the speech, "The men instinctively sensed the fact and the telling mark that they themselves would play in world history because of it, for they were being told as much right now. Deep sincerity and seriousness lay behind the General's colorful words, and the men well knew it, but they loved the way he put it as only he could do it."

A notable minority of Patton's officers were unimpressed or displeased with their commander's use of obscenities, viewing it as unprofessional conduct for a military officer. Among some officers' later recounting of the speech, 'bullshit' would be replaced by 'baloney' and 'fucking' by 'fornicating'. At least one account replaced "We're going to hold the enemy by the balls" with "We're going to hold the enemy by the nose". Among the critics of Patton's frequent use of vulgarities was General Omar Bradley, Patton's former subordinate. The men were polar opposites in personality and there is evidence that Bradley disliked Patton both personally and professionally. In response to criticisms of his coarse language, Patton wrote to a family member: "When I want my men to remember something important, to really make it stick, I give it to them double dirty. It may not sound nice to a bunch of little old ladies, at an afternoon tea party, but it helps my soldiers to remember. You can't run an army without profanity, and it has to be eloquent profanity. An army without profanity couldn't fight its way out of a piss-soaked paper bag."

Under Patton, the Third Army landed in Normandy during July 1944 and would go on to play an integral role in the last months of the war in Europe, closing the Falaise pocket in mid-August, and playing the key role in relieving the Siege of Bastogne during the Battle of the Bulge in December, a feat regarded as one of the most notable achievements in the war. The rapid offensive action and speed that Patton called for in the speech became actions which brought the Third Army wide acclaim in the campaign.

Historians acclaim the speech as one of Patton's best works. Author Terry Brighton called it "the greatest motivational speech of the war and perhaps of all time, exceeding (in its morale boosting effect if not as literature) the words Shakespeare gave King Henry V at Agincourt". Alan Axelrod contended it was the most famous of his many memorable quotes.

The speech became an icon of popular culture after the 1970 film Patton. The opening of the movie saw actor George C. Scott, as Patton, delivering a toned-down version of the speech before an enormous American flag, beginning with a version of his "No bastard ever won a war by dying for his country ..." quip. Scott's iteration omitted much of the middle of the speech relating to Patton's anecdotes about Sicily and Libya, as well as his remarks about the importance of every soldier to the war effort. In contrast to Patton's humorous approach, Scott delivered the speech in an entirely serious, low and gruff tone. Scott's depiction of Patton in this scene is an iconic depiction of the general which earned him an Academy Award for Best Actor, and was instrumental in bringing Patton into popular culture as a folk hero.

Convicted spy Robert Hanssen was identified by the FBI from his repeated use of Patton's phrase about "the purple-pissing Japanese".
