= Reino Gikman =

KGB officer

- Born: Reino Gikman; March 27, 1930; Terijoki, Finland (present-day Zelenogorsk, Russia) (alleged)
- Disappeared: June 1989 (aged 59); Vienna, Austria
- Status: Missing for 37 years, 3 months and 27 days

Reino Gikman (allegedly born March 27, 1930, Ino, Terijoki, Finland) was the alias used by an undercover agent for the Soviet KGB who operated in Western Europe. Gikman used a Finnish passport and spent several years in Finland developing his illegal residence cover by posing as a Finn. The KGB was able to create fake Finnish citizenships by inserting fake births into the church records with the help of a priest of the Finnish Orthodox Church. Gikman's fake personality was however the result of the theft in 1952 of four registry books of church records from the Orthodox repository in Kuopio. He received his first Finnish passport at a Finnish embassy, before ever entering Finland. He moved to Finland in 1966, and held various jobs in Helsinki in the 1960s, working e.g. in the Suomalainen Kirjakauppa bookstore. In 1968 he "married" a fictitious woman named Martta Nieminen, with whom he had an equally fictitious son named John Robert Gikman, who was reported to have been born in Düsseldorf on 10 June 1968.

== Disappearance ==
From 1979 until his disappearance in June 1989 he was living in Vienna, and reportedly working for the United Nations in Paris. A wiretapped telephone conversation on April 27, 1989, between Gikman and Felix Bloch, a U.S. State Department official stationed in Vienna from 1980 to 1987, was the original cause of espionage suspicions on Bloch.

== Similar cases ==
The Finnish Security Intelligence Service estimates that Russian intelligence had several dozen fictitious Finnish identities at their disposal. One such example was Veikko Pöllänen, allegedly born January 12, 1943, in Sortavala, who married a second adopter of a fictitious personality named Sirkka-Liisa Reponen, allegedly born April 3, 1945, in Suonenjoki. The couple fled Finland in 1985, apparently due to fears of being exposed due to Oleg Gordievsky's defection.

== See also ==
- List of people who disappeared mysteriously: post-1970
