= Online Film Critics Society Award for Best Ensemble =

Annual film award

The Online Film Critics Society Award for Best Ensemble was an annual film award given by the Online Film Critics Society to honor the best ensemble of the year, given between 1998 and 2002.

== Winners ==
- 1998: Saving Private Ryan

Edward Burns, Matt Damon, Jeremy Davies, Vin Diesel, Adam Goldberg, Tom Hanks, Barry Pepper, Giovanni Ribisi and Tom Sizemore

- 1999: American Beauty

Annette Bening, Wes Bentley, Thora Birch, Chris Cooper, Peter Gallagher, Allison Janney, Kevin Spacey and Mena Suvari

=== 2000s ===
- 2000 (t): Almost Famous

Fairuza Balk, Billy Crudup, Patrick Fugit, Philip Seymour Hoffman, Kate Hudson, Jason Lee, Frances McDormand, Anna Paquin, and Noah Taylor

- 2000 (t): State and Main

Alec Baldwin, Philip Seymour Hoffman, Charles Durning, Sarah Jessica Parker, William H. Macy, David Paymer, Rebecca Pidgeon, and Julia Stiles

- 2001: Gosford Park

Eileen Atkins, Bob Balaban, Sir Alan Bates, Charles Dance, Stephen Fry, Sir Michael Gambon, Richard E. Grant, Tom Hollander, Sir Derek Jacobi, Kelly Macdonald, Dame Helen Mirren, Jeremy Northam, Clive Owen, Ryan Phillippe, Kristin Scott Thomas, Dame Maggie Smith, Geraldine Somerville, Sophie Thompson, Emily Watson, and James Wilby

- 2002: The Lord of the Rings: The Two Towers

Sean Astin, Cate Blanchett, Orlando Bloom, Billy Boyd, Brad Dourif, Bernard Hill, Christopher Lee, Ian McKellen, Dominic Monaghan, Viggo Mortensen, Miranda Otto, John Rhys-Davies, Andy Serkis, Liv Tyler, Hugo Weaving, David Wenham, and Elijah Wood

- 2017: Three Billboards Outside Ebbing, Missouri

Frances McDormand, Woody Harrelson, Sam Rockwell, Abbie Cornish, John Hawkes, and Peter Dinklage
