= Foxstone Park =

Park in Virginia, United States

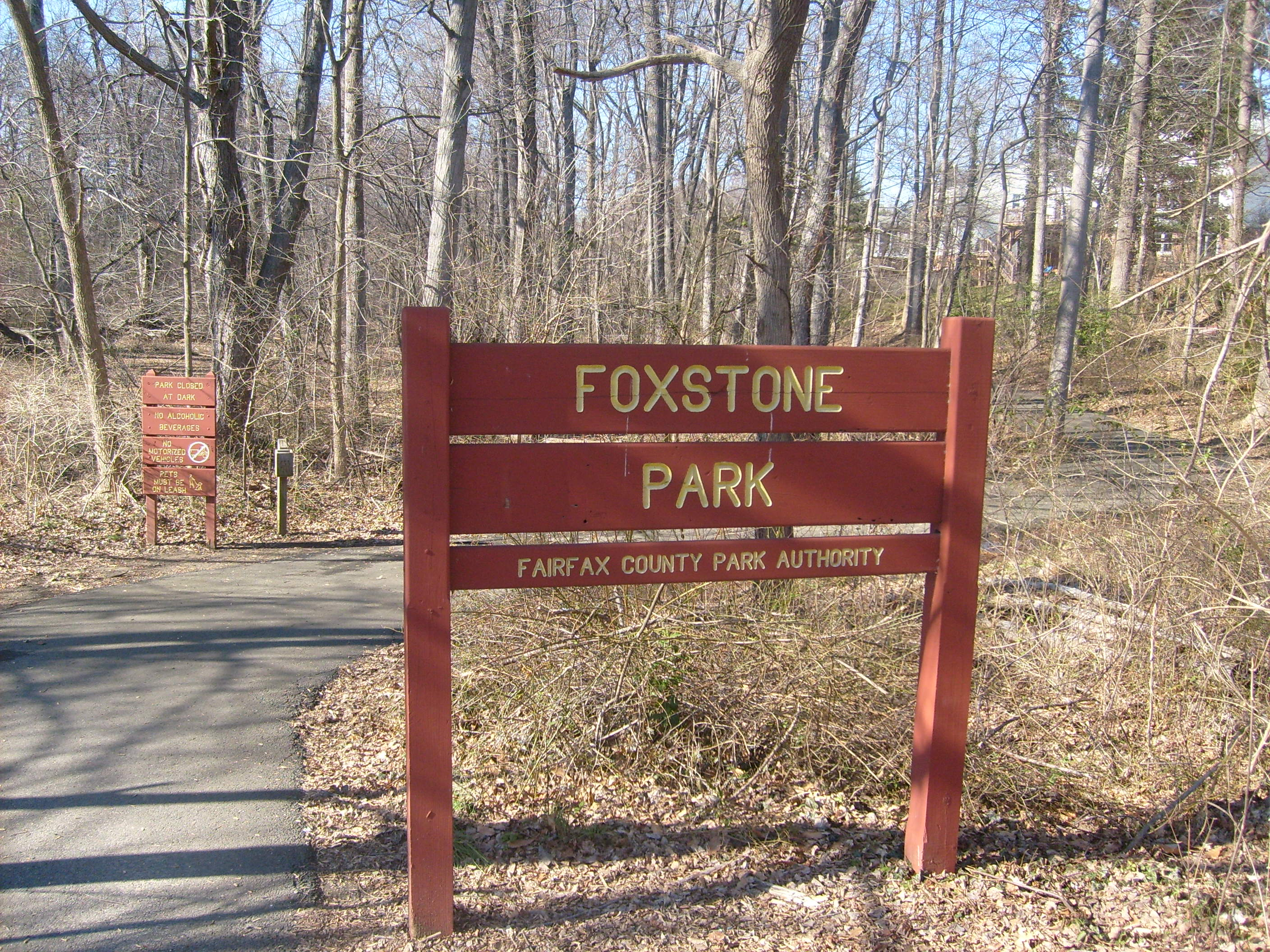
- Creek Crossing Road entrance to Foxstone Park
- Interactive map of Foxstone Park
- Location: Vienna, Fairfax County, Virginia, USA
- Coordinates: 38°54′55″N 77°15′30″W
- Area: 14.42-acre (0.0584 km^{2})
- Operator: Fairfax County Park Authority
- Open: All year
- Website: FCPA - Nature Trails

Foxstone Park is a 14.42-acre (58,400 m^{2}) park located at 1910 Creek Crossing Road in Vienna, Fairfax County, Virginia, USA and run by the Fairfax County Park Authority.

== Robert Hanssen ==
Robert Hanssen, who was convicted of spying for the Soviet Union and Russia, conducted dead drops there.

One account relates:

Within a mile of his home, Foxstone Park meanders along Wolftrap Creek through Hanssen's neighborhood and a golf course. He used Foxstone Park's rustic wooden sign as his signal site, marking it with a piece of Johnson & Johnson medical adhesive tape placed vertically, to signal he had loaded the dead drop in the other side of the road... The drop site codenamed ELLIS was a dark, damp place under a footbridge

Another account relates:

He was caught one evening, minutes after leaving a dead drop under a footbridge at Wolftrap Creek in Foxstone Park, near his house in Vienna, Virginia. FBI agents also found $50,000 the Russian Foreign Intelligence Service (SVR...) left for him at another site.

Hanssen was arrested on February 18, 2001, at the park, which lies near his home (also in Vienna).

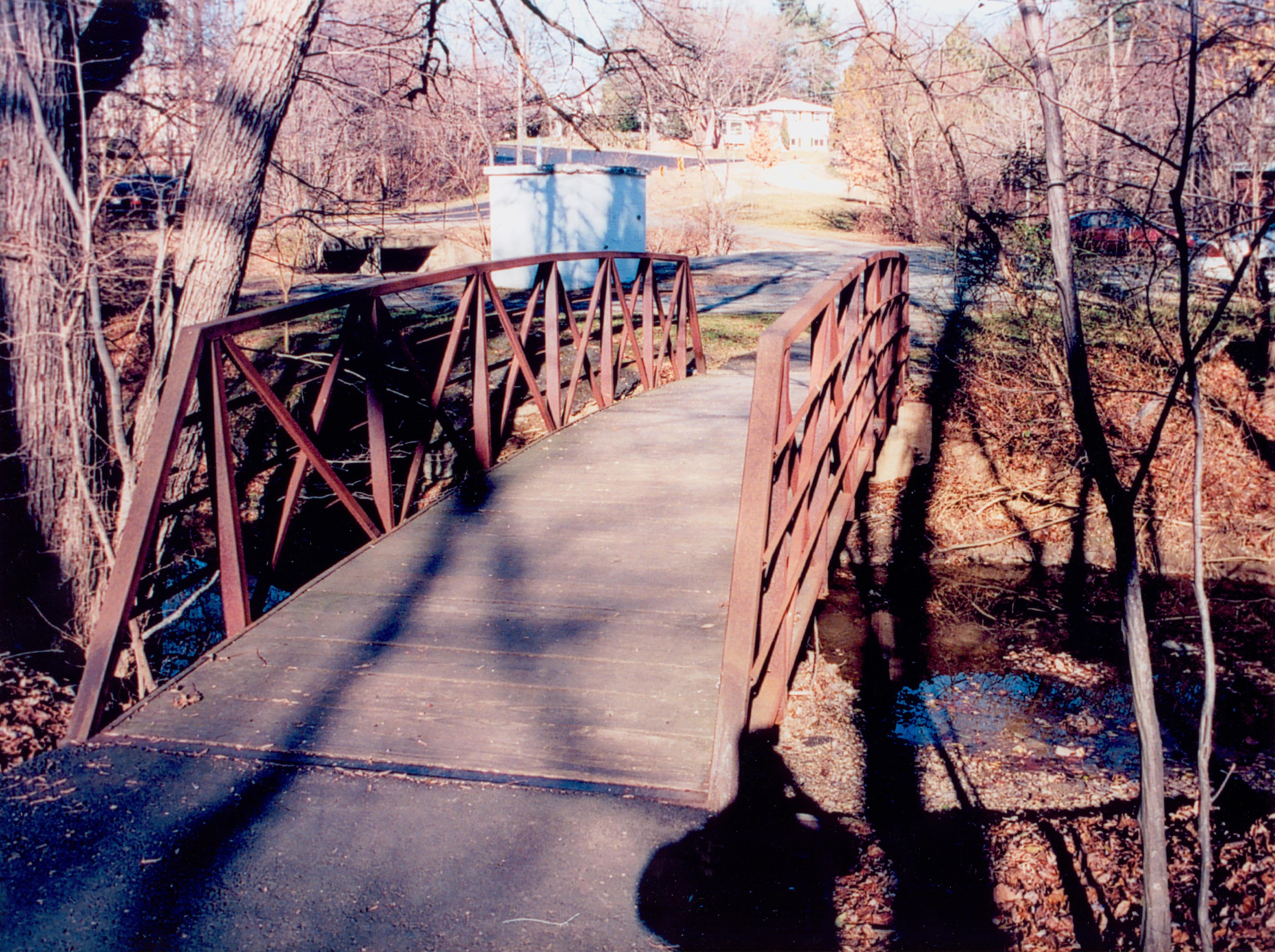
Ellis dead drop site

He was charged with selling U.S. secrets to the Soviet Union and subsequently the Russian Federation for more than US$1.4 million in cash and diamonds over a 22-year period.
