= Server supported gaming =

Server supported gaming (SSG) is a method employed by video lotteries and casinos to operate Video Lottery Terminals (VLTs) and Electronic Gaming Machines (EGMs, commonly referred to as slot machines). An SSG system includes a central system and gaming terminals which connect to the central system. SSG systems may be operated locally over a LAN or span large geographical areas, even entire nations, over a WAN, such as the Internet.

SSG is often mistakenly referred to as Server Based Gaming (SBG), both examples of server centric gaming. A key difference is that in SSG systems, each game terminal has to contain a Random Number Generator (RNG) and complete local copies of the games, whereas SBG systems centralize both the RNG and game logic. In SSG systems, the server support is limited to analysis, content distribution and management, while SBG systems utilize the server for the actual gameplay and multiple other features as well.

== Certification and legality ==
Gaming Laboratories International has created a standard (GLI #21) which includes requirements and definitions for Server Centric Gaming systems, referred to as Client-Server Systems (CSS). GLI differentiates between Server Based Gaming Systems (SBGS) and Server Supported Gaming Systems (SSGS). GLI defines SBGS as “The combination of a server and client terminals in which the entire or integral portion of game content resides on the server.” SSGS is defined as “The combination of a server and client terminal(s) which together allow the transfer of the entire control program and game content to the client terminal(s)…” GLI certifies SBG and SSG systems according to the GLI #21 standard, something which is a requirement by many operators and jurisdictions for them to consider and allow such systems.

== See also ==
- Server Based Gaming
- Server centric gaming
- Video lottery terminals
- Slot machine
- Casino game
