= Gray Day =

2019 non-fiction book by Eric O'Neill

Gray Day: My Undercover Mission to Expose America's First Cyber Spy
- First edition
- Language: English
- Publisher: Crown Books
- Publication date: 2019

Gray Day: My Undercover Mission to Expose America's First Cyber Spy is a 2019 non-fiction book by Eric O'Neill, published by Crown Books, about his mission to collect evidence against Robert Hanssen, an employee of the Federal Bureau of Investigation (FBI) who spied for Russia.

The book's opening scene is O'Neill's December 2000 meeting with his supervisor about the mission to ensnare Hanssen. Paul Davis wrote in the Washington Times that the main focus of the book is the operation to capture Hanssen, and that it does not "dwell on his motivation other than wanting extra money" nor does it discuss in detail any of his sexual conduct.

== Reviews ==
Publishers Weekly wrote that Gray Day "largely succeeds in its efforts to create a tightly wound narrative around a remarkable investigation into a Russian asset." The publication stated that the author successfully increases the reader's feeling of suspense so that "foregone historical conclusions, [...] feel like white-knuckle cliffhangers." It also notes that the book "deglamorizes undercover work while conveying the uncertainty, stress, and excitement that accompany a successful investigation." It did note, on occasions, use of "potboiler territory" language.

Kirkus Reviews stated that the "exploration of the psychology" and the "motivations" of Hanssen as well as how it details why people who commit espionage "so often enjoy success for as long as they do until finally caught" give it its value. Kirkus did state that "familiar clichés of espionage" appear in the text. Kirkus identified possible audiences as people who read "true crime" and "spy fiction" works.

Davis concluded that the book is "a well-written and suspenseful story".

== See also ==
- Spy: The Inside Story of How the FBI's Robert Hanssen Betrayed America - Book about the Hanssen case by David Wise
