= Brian Kelley (CIA officer) =

American CIA officer (1943-2011)

- Born: January 8, 1943; Waterbury, Connecticut, U.S.
- Died: September 19, 2011 (aged 68); Vienna, Virginia
- Occupation: CIA counterintelligence officer

Brian Kelley (January 8, 1943 – September 19, 2011) was an American Central Intelligence Agency (CIA) counterintelligence officer. He was investigated by the CIA and FBI as a suspected KGB mole during the 1990s, before FBI agent Robert Hanssen was identified as the actual mole and arrested in 2001. Having been suspended during the investigation, Kelley was reinstated by the CIA and later received the Distinguished Career Intelligence Medal for his service.

== Early life ==
Kelley was born in Waterbury, Connecticut. He earned degrees in political science from Saint Michael's College and East Asian studies from Florida State University.

== Career ==
After graduating from college he joined the United States Air Force and worked in its Office of Special Investigations. After leaving the Air Force he joined the CIA.

After full reinstatement, Kelley educated personnel in various government agencies on professional counterintelligence. He retired from the CIA in 2007 and worked for the private contractor Abraxas Corporation and continued to teach counterintelligence. He also taught counterintelligence at The Institute of World Politics.

== Death ==
Kelley died on September 19, 2011, in his sleep at his home in Vienna, Virginia.
