= Alexander Freeman (mathematician) =

English astronomer and mathematician

Alexander Freeman (1838–1897) was an English astronomer and mathematician and a noted correspondent of James Clerk Maxwell and Willard Gibbs.
