= Alexander Freeman (film director) =

American filmmaker

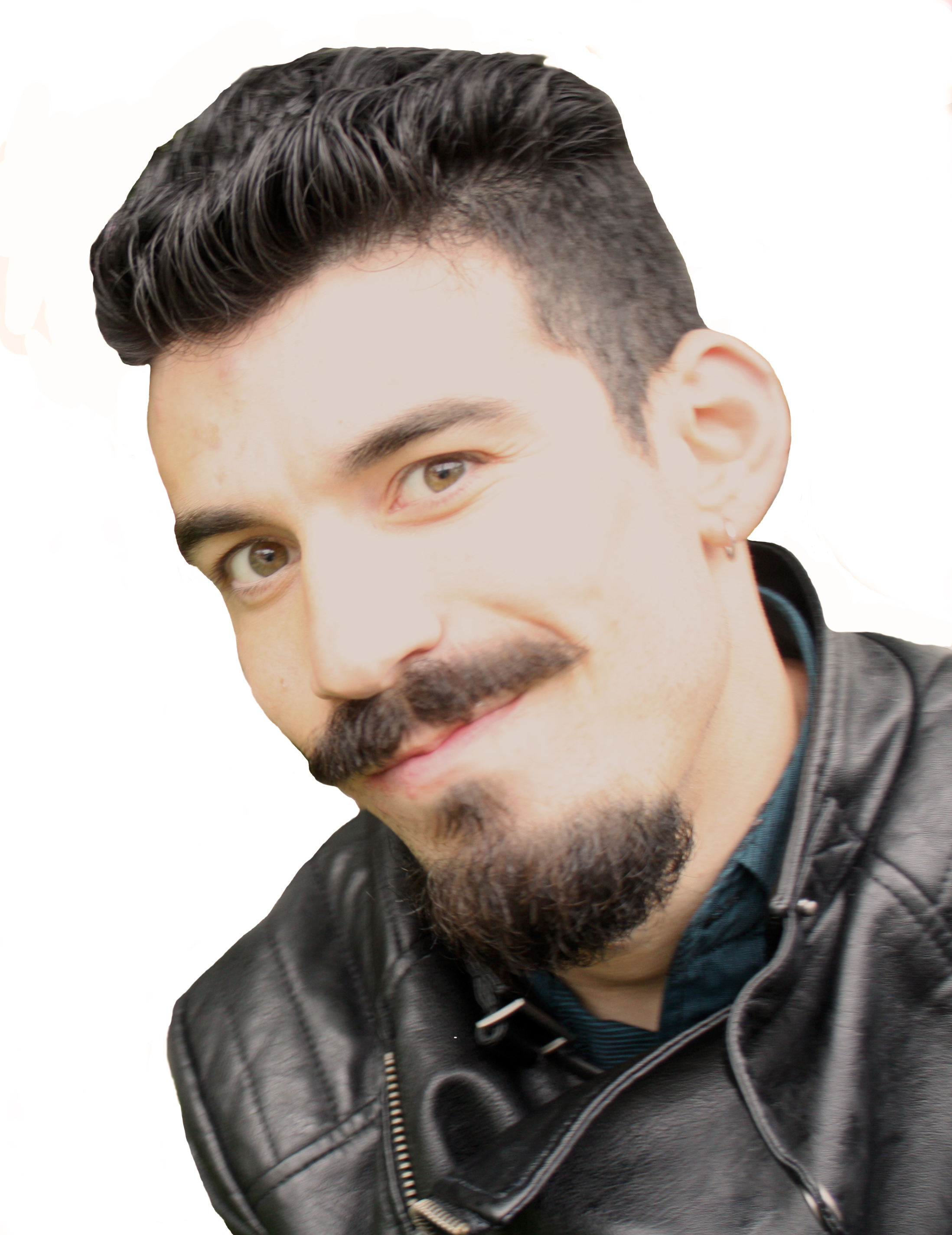
- Born: Alexander James Freeman; June 19, 1987 (age 38)
- Education: Film Production (Directing), Emerson College, 2014
- Occupations: Film Director, Producer, Screenwriter

Alexander Freeman (born June 19, 1987) is an American film director, producer, and screenwriter with cerebral palsy.

== Early life and education ==
Freeman was born in 1987 in Newton, Massachusetts. He graduated from Brookline High School, where he participated in the theatre program and a video production class.

After completing high school, he worked for City Year in Boston, producing a recruitment film. Freeman graduated from Emerson College with a degree in Film Production.

== Filmography ==
=== Film ===
Year	Title	Contribution	Notes
2013	The Last Taboo	Writer, Producer, Director	Documentary
2017	The Wounds We Cannot See	Writer, Executive Producer, Producer, Director, Co-Editor	Documentary
2024	My Own Normal	Writer, Producer, Director	Documentary
2025	True Value	Writer, Producer, Director	Documentary
