= Robert Hanssen =

American double agent and spy (1944–2023)

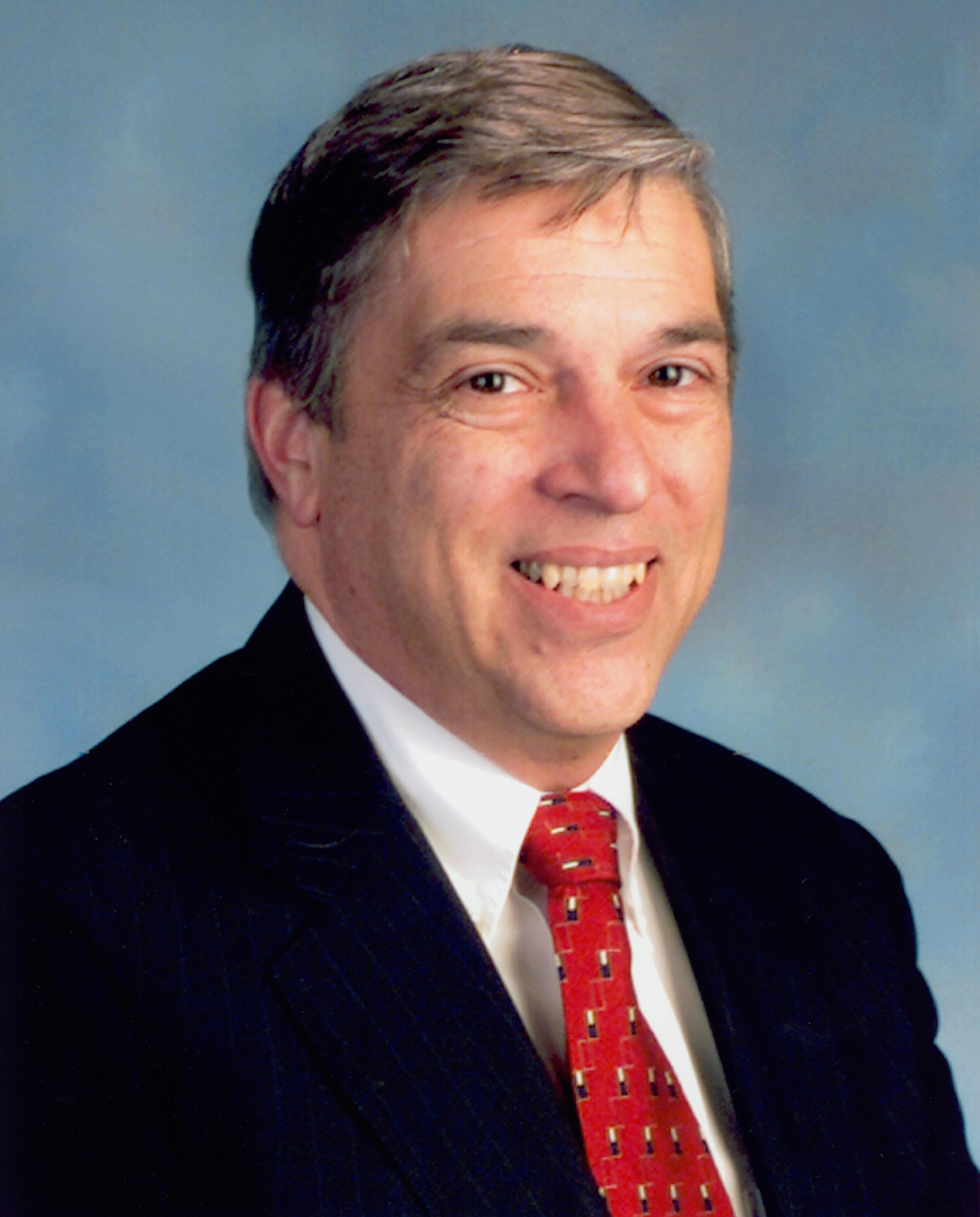
- Official FBI portrait of Hanssen
- Born: Robert Philip Hanssen; April 18, 1944; Chicago, Illinois, U.S.
- Died: June 5, 2023 (aged 79); ADX Florence, Fremont County, Colorado, U.S.
- Other name: Ramon Garcia
- Education: Knox College (BS); Northwestern University (MBA)
- Occupation: FBI agent (1976–2001)
- Known for: Espionage against the United States
- Criminal charges: 18 U.S.C. § 794(a) and 794(c) (Espionage Act)
- Criminal penalty: 15 concurrent life sentences without parole
- Spouse: Bernadette "Bonnie" Wauck (m. 1968)
- Children: 6
- Espionage activity
- Country: United States
- Allegiance: Soviet Union; Russia
- Service branch: Federal Bureau of Investigation
- Agency: FBI
- Service years: 1979–2001
- Codename: Ramon Garcia; Jim Baker; G. Robertson; Graysuit; "B"

Robert Philip Hanssen (April 18, 1944 – June 5, 2023) was an American Federal Bureau of Investigation (FBI) agent who spied for Soviet and Russian intelligence services intermittently against the United States from 1979 to 2001. His espionage was described by the United States Department of Justice as "possibly the worst intelligence disaster in U.S. history".

In 1979, three years after joining the FBI, Hanssen approached the Soviet Main Intelligence Directorate (GRU) to offer his services, beginning his first espionage cycle, lasting until 1981. He restarted his espionage activities in 1985 and continued until 1991, when he ended communications during the collapse of the Soviet Union, fearing he would be exposed. Hanssen successfully reestablished communications eight years later in 1999 and continued spying until his arrest. Throughout his espionage career, he remained anonymous to his Soviet and Russian handlers.

Hanssen sold about six thousand classified documents to the KGB that detailed U.S. strategies in the event of nuclear war, developments in military weapons technologies, and aspects of the U.S. counterintelligence program. He was spying at the same time as Aldrich Ames in the Central Intelligence Agency (CIA). Both Ames and Hanssen compromised the names of KGB agents working secretly for the U.S., some of whom were executed for their betrayal, and were run by the same KGB officer, Victor Cherkashin. Hanssen also revealed a multimillion-dollar eavesdropping tunnel built by the FBI under the Soviet Embassy. After Ames's arrest in 1994, some of these intelligence breaches remained unsolved, and the search for another spy continued. The FBI paid $7 million to a KGB agent to obtain a file on an anonymous mole, whom the FBI later identified as Hanssen through fingerprint and voice analysis.

Hanssen was arrested on February 18, 2001, at Foxstone Park, near his home in the Washington, D.C., suburb of Vienna, Virginia, after leaving a package of classified materials at a dead drop site. He was charged with selling U.S. intelligence documents to the Soviet Union and subsequently Russia for more than $1.4 million in cash, diamonds and Rolex watches over twenty-two years. To avoid the death penalty, Hanssen pleaded guilty to 14 counts of espionage and one of conspiracy to commit espionage. He was sentenced to 15 life terms without the possibility of parole by Federal District judge Claude M. Hilton and was incarcerated at ADX Florence until his death in 2023.

== Early life ==
Hanssen was born in Chicago to a Lutheran family that lived in the Norwood Park neighborhood. His father, Howard (died 1993), a Chicago police officer, was allegedly emotionally abusive to Hanssen during his childhood. Hanssen graduated from William Howard Taft High School in 1962 and attended Knox College in Galesburg, Illinois, where he earned a bachelor's degree in chemistry in 1966.

Hanssen applied for a cryptography position at the NSA after graduating from college, but was turned down due to budget constraints. He enrolled in dental school at Northwestern University, but switched his focus at the university to business after three years. Hanssen received an MBA in accounting and information systems in 1971 and took a job with an accounting firm. He quit after one year and joined the Chicago Police Department as an internal affairs (IA) investigator, specializing in forensic accounting. In January 1976, Hanssen left the Chicago police to join the FBI.

Hanssen met Bernadette "Bonnie" Wauck, a staunch Roman Catholic, while attending dental school at Northwestern University. The couple married in 1968, and Hanssen converted from Lutheranism to Catholicism.

== Career and espionage ==
=== FBI career and first espionage activities (1976–1981) ===
Upon becoming a special agent on January 12, 1976, Hanssen was transferred to the FBI's field office in Gary, Indiana. In 1978, he and his growing family of three (eventually six) children relocated to New York City when the bureau transferred him to its field office there. The next year, Hanssen was transferred to counterintelligence and given the task of compiling a database of Soviet intelligence for the FBI.

In 1979, Hanssen approached the Soviet GRU and offered his services. He never indicated any political or ideological motive for his actions, telling the FBI after he was caught that his only motivation was financial. During his first espionage cycle, Hanssen provided a significant amount of information to the GRU, including details of the FBI's bugging activities and lists of suspected Soviet intelligence agents. His most important leak was the betrayal of Dmitri Polyakov, a CIA informant who passed enormous amounts of information to U.S. intelligence while rising to the rank of general in the Soviet Army. Following a second betrayal by CIA mole Aldrich Ames in 1985, Polyakov was arrested in 1986 and executed in 1988. Ames was officially blamed for giving Polyakov's name to the Soviets, while Hanssen's attempt was not revealed until after his 2001 capture.

=== FBI counterintelligence unit, further espionage activities (1985–1991) ===
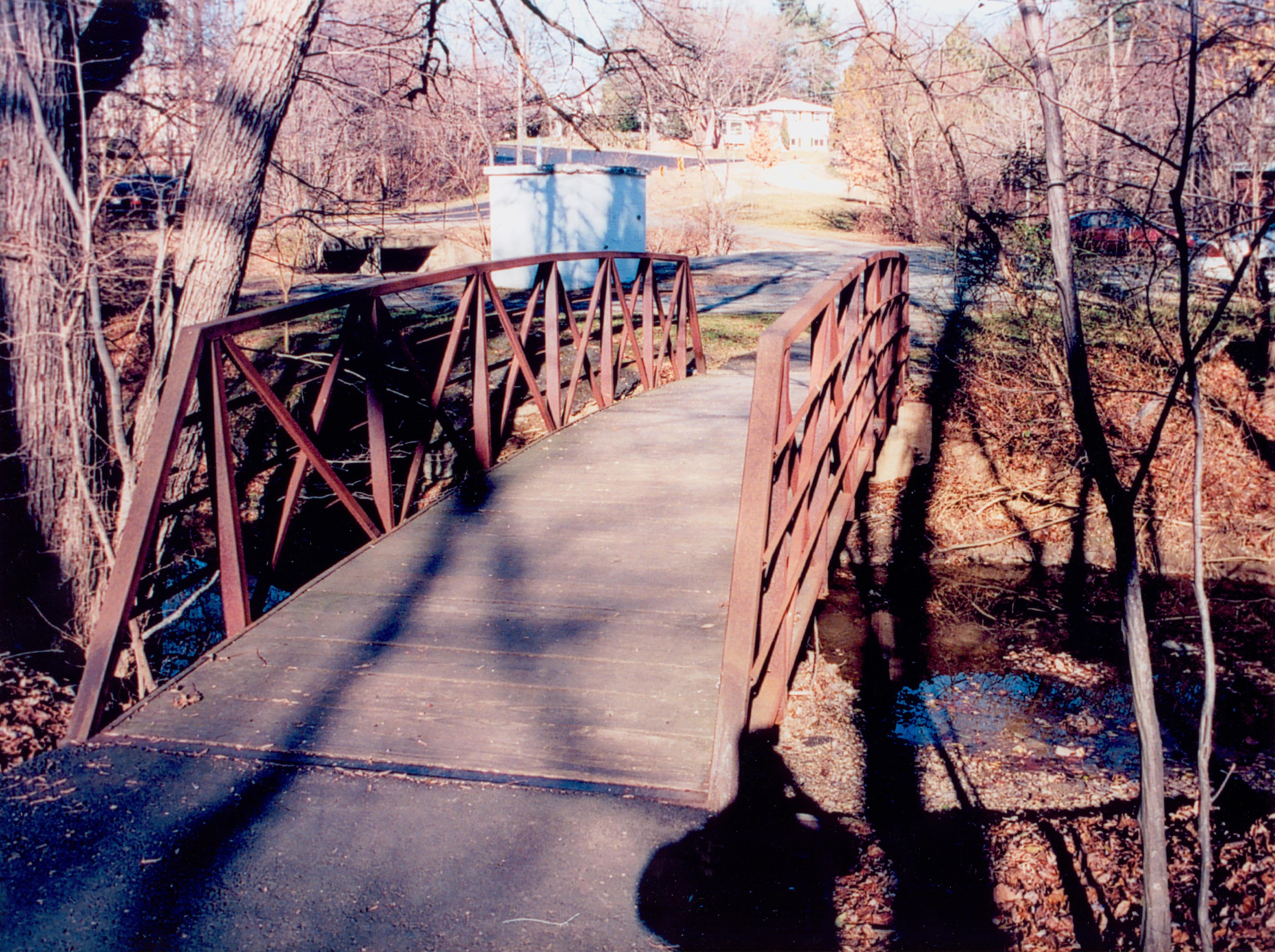
"Ellis" dead drop site in Foxstone Park used by Hanssen, including on the day of his arrest

In 1981, Hanssen was transferred to FBI HQ in D.C., and relocated his family to the suburb of Vienna, Virginia. His new job in the FBI's budget office gave him access to information involving many different FBI operations. This included all the FBI activities related to wiretapping and electronic surveillance, which were Hanssen's responsibility. He became known in the FBI as an expert on computers.

Three years later, Hanssen transferred to the FBI's Soviet analytical unit, responsible for studying, identifying, and capturing Soviet spies and intelligence operatives in the United States. Hanssen's section evaluated Soviet agents who volunteered to provide intelligence to determine whether they were genuine or re-doubled agents. In 1985, Hanssen was again transferred to the FBI's field office in New York City, where he continued to work in counterintelligence against the Soviets. After the transfer, while on a business visit back to Washington, he resumed his espionage career.

On October 1, 1985, Hanssen sent an anonymous letter to the KGB offering his services and asking for $100,000 in cash, equivalent to $300,000 in 2025. In the letter, he gave the names of three KGB agents secretly working for the FBI: Boris Yuzhin, Valery Martinov, and Sergei Motorin. Although Hanssen was unaware, Ames had already exposed all three agents earlier that year. Yuzhin had returned to Moscow in 1982 and had been subject to an intensive investigation by the KGB because he had lost a concealed camera in the Soviet consulate in San Francisco, but he was not arrested until he was exposed by Ames and Hanssen. Martynov and Motorin were recalled to Moscow, where they were arrested, charged, tried, and convicted of espionage against the Soviet government. Martynov and Motorin were executed via gunshot to the back of the head; Yuzhin was imprisoned for six years before he was released by a general amnesty granted to political prisoners and he subsequently immigrated to the U.S. Because the FBI blamed Ames for the leak, Hanssen was neither suspected nor investigated. The October 1 letter began a long, active espionage period for Hanssen.

Hanssen was recalled to D.C., yet again in 1987. He was tasked with studying all known and rumored penetrations of the FBI to find the man who had betrayed Martynov and Motorin; in effect, he was charged with searching for himself. Hanssen ensured that he did not reveal himself in his study, but he also gave the entire study—including the list of all Soviets who had contacted the FBI about FBI moles—to the KGB in 1988. That same year, Hanssen, according to a government report, committed a "serious security breach" by revealing secret information to a Soviet defector during a debriefing. The agents working for him reported this breach to a supervisor, but no action was taken.

In 1989, Hanssen compromised the FBI investigation into Felix Bloch, a Department of State (DOS) official suspected of espionage. Hanssen warned the KGB that Bloch was under investigation, prompting the KGB to end contact with him abruptly. The FBI could not produce any good evidence, and as a result, Bloch was never charged with a crime, although the State Department later terminated his employment and denied his pension. The failure of the Bloch investigation and the FBI's investigation of how the KGB learned that they were investigating Bloch caused the mole hunt that eventually resulted in Hanssen's arrest.

Later that year, Hanssen gave the KGB extensive information about U.S. planning for measurement and signature intelligence (MASINT), a general term for intelligence collected through various electronic means, such as radar, spy satellites, and signal intercepts. When the Soviets began construction on a new embassy in 1977, the FBI dug a tunnel beneath their decoding room. The FBI planned to use it for eavesdropping, but never did for fear of being caught. Hanssen disclosed this information to the Soviets in September 1989 and received a $55,000 payment the next month, equivalent to $140,000 in 2025. On two occasions, Hanssen gave the Soviets a complete list of American double agents.

In 1990, Hanssen's brother-in-law, Mark Wauck, an FBI employee, recommended that the FBI investigate Hanssen for espionage after his sister, Hanssen's wife, told him that their sister, Jeanne Beglis, had found a pile of money on a dresser in the Hanssens' house. Bonnie had previously told her brother that Hanssen had once talked about retiring in Poland, then part of the Eastern Bloc. Wauck also knew that the FBI was hunting for a mole and spoke with his supervisor, who took no action.

=== Later FBI career, continued espionage activities (1992–2001) ===
When the USSR dissolved in December 1991, Hanssen, possibly worried that he could be exposed amid the ensuing political upheaval, ceased communications with his handlers for about 10 months. The following year, after the Russian Federation assumed control of the defunct Soviet spy agencies, Hanssen made a risky approach to the GRU. He went to the Russian embassy in person and physically approached a GRU officer in the parking garage. Hanssen, carrying a package of documents, identified himself by his Soviet code name, "Ramon Garcia", and described himself as a "disaffected FBI agent" who was offering his services as a spy. The Russian officer, who did not recognize the code name, drove away. The Russians then filed an official protest with the DOS, believing Hanssen to be a triple agent. Despite having shown his face, disclosed his code name, and revealed his FBI affiliation, Hanssen escaped arrest when the FBI's investigation into the incident did not advance.

Hanssen continued to take risks in 1993 when he hacked into the computer of a fellow FBI agent, Ray Mislock, printed a classified document from Mislock's computer, and took it to Mislock, saying, "You didn't believe me that the system was insecure." Hanssen's superiors began an investigation into his activities. In the end, officials believed his claim that he was merely demonstrating flaws in the FBI's security system. Mislock has since theorized that Hanssen probably went onto his computer to see if his superiors were investigating him for espionage and invented the document story to cover his tracks.

In 1994, Hanssen expressed interest in a transfer to the new National Counterintelligence and Security Center (NCSC), which coordinated counterintelligence activities. When told that he would have to take a lie detector test to join, Hanssen changed his mind. Three years later, convicted FBI mole Earl Edwin Pitts told the FBI that he suspected Hanssen due to the Mislock incident. Pitts was the second FBI agent to mention Hanssen by name as a possible mole, but superiors were still unconvinced, and no action was taken.

Information technology (IT) personnel from the NSD's IIS Unit were sent to investigate Hanssen's desktop computer after a reported failure. NSD chief Johnnie Sullivan ordered the computer impounded after it seemed to have been tampered with. A digital investigation found that an attempted hack had occurred using a password cracking program installed by Hanssen, which triggered a security alert and a lockup. After the FBI CART Unit confirmed the attempted hack, Sullivan filed a report with OPR requesting a further investigation. Hanssen claimed he was trying to connect a color printer to his computer, but needed the password cracker to bypass the administrative password. The FBI believed his story, and Hanssen was merely warned.

While the investigation into his computer was underway, Hanssen searched the FBI's internal case records to see whether he was under investigation. He was indiscreet enough to type his name into FBI search engines. Finding nothing, Hanssen decided to resume his spy career after eight years without contact with the Russians. He established contact with the SVR (a successor to the KGB) in autumn 1999. Hanssen continued to perform incriminating searches of FBI files for his name and address.

== Investigation and arrest ==
The existence of two Russian moles working simultaneously in the U.S. security and intelligence establishment—Ames at the CIA and Hanssen at the FBI—complicated counterintelligence efforts during the 1990s. Ames was arrested in 1994. His exposure explained many of the losses of assets that U.S. intelligence had suffered during the 1980s, including the arrest and execution of Martinov and Motorin. However, two cases—the Bloch investigation and the embassy tunnel—remained unsolved. Ames had been stationed in Rome, Italy at the time of the Bloch investigation and could not have known about the case or the tunnel under the embassy, as he did not work for the FBI.

The FBI and CIA formed a joint mole-hunting team in 1994 to find the suspected second intelligence leak. They created a list of all agents known to have access to compromised cases. The FBI's codename for the suspected spy was "Graysuit". Some promising suspects were cleared, and the mole hunt found other penetrations, such as CIA officer Harold James Nicholson, who was arrested in 1996. However, Hanssen escaped notice, likely because these efforts concentrated on CIA agents rather than FBI agents.

By 1998, using FBI criminal profiling techniques, the pursuers mistakenly suspected Brian Kelley, a CIA operative involved in the Bloch investigation. The CIA and FBI searched his house, tapped his telephone, and surveilled him, following him and his family. In November 1998, they had a man with a foreign accent come to Kelley's door, warn him that the FBI knew he was a spy, and tell him to show up at a Metro station the next day to escape. Kelley instead reported the incident to the FBI. In 1999, the FBI interrogated Kelley, his ex-wife, two sisters, and three children, who denied all accusations. He was eventually placed on administrative leave, where he remained, falsely accused until after Hanssen was arrested.

FBI investigators later made progress during an operation in which they paid disaffected Russian intelligence officers to provide information about moles. They paid $7,000,000 to KGB agent Aleksander Shcherbakov who had access to a file on "B". While it did not contain Hanssen's name, among the information was an audiotape of a July 21, 1986, conversation between "B" and KGB agent Aleksander Fefelov. FBI agent Michael Waguespack recognized the voice in the tape, but could not remember whose it was. Rifling through the rest of the files, they found notes of the mole using a quote from George S. Patton's speech to the Third Army about "the purple-pissing Japanese". FBI analyst Bob King remembered Hanssen using that same quote. Waguespack listened to the tape again and recognized the voice as Hanssen's. With the mole finally identified, locations, dates, and cases were matched with Hanssen's activities during the period. Two fingerprints collected from a trash bag in the file were analyzed and proved to be Hanssen's.

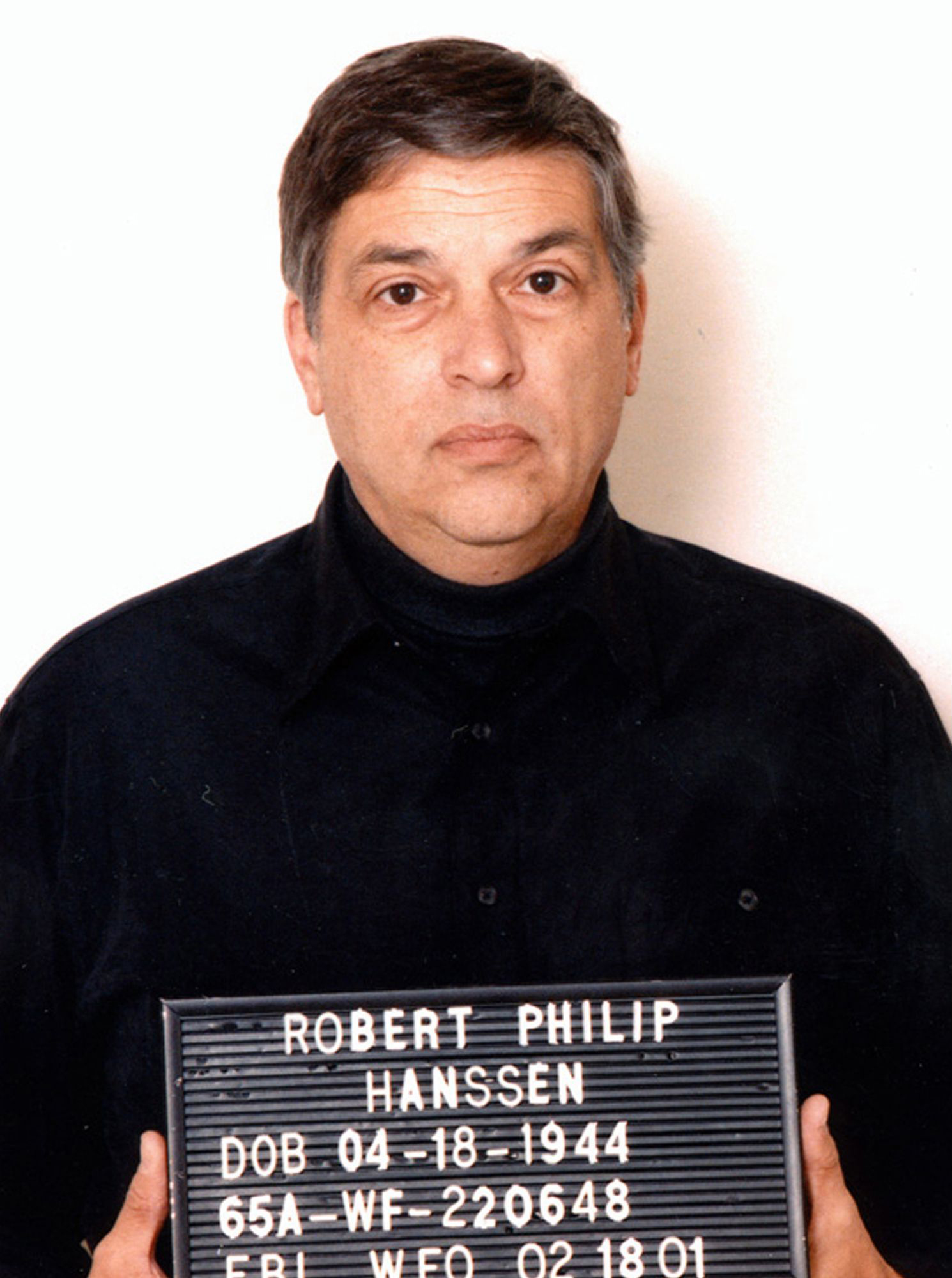
Hanssen's mug shot, taken on the day of his arrest

The FBI surveilled Hanssen and soon discovered he was again in contact with the Russians. To bring him back to FBI headquarters, where he could be closely monitored and kept away from sensitive data, they promoted him. They gave him a new job supervising FBI computer security. Hanssen was given an office and an assistant, Eric O'Neill, a young FBI surveillance specialist assigned to watch Hanssen. O'Neill ascertained that Hanssen was using a personal digital assistant (PDA) device known as a Palm III to store his information. When O'Neill was able to briefly obtain Hanssen's PDA and have agents download and decode its encrypted contents, the FBI acquired its conclusive evidence.

During his final days with the FBI, Hanssen began to suspect something was wrong. In early February 2001, he asked his friend at a computer technology company for a job. He also believed he heard noises on his car radio indicating it was bugged, although the FBI was later unable to reproduce the sounds Hanssen claimed to hear. In the last letter he wrote to the Russians, which was found by the FBI when he was arrested, Hanssen said that he had been promoted to a "do-nothing job ... outside of regular access to information" and that "Something has aroused the sleeping tiger".

However, Hanssen's suspicions did not stop him from making one more dead drop. After leaving a friend at an airport on February 18, 2001, Hanssen drove to Virginia's Foxstone Park. He placed a white piece of tape on a park sign to signal his Russian contacts that there was information at the dead drop site. He then followed his usual routine, taking a sealed garbage bag containing classified material and taping it to the underside of a wooden footbridge over a creek. When FBI agents observed this incriminating act, they rushed in to arrest Hanssen. Upon being arrested, Hanssen asked, "What took you so long?" The FBI waited two more days to see if any of Hanssen's SVR handlers would show up at Foxstone Park. When they failed to appear, the DoJ announced Hanssen's arrest on February 20.

=== Guilty plea and imprisonment ===
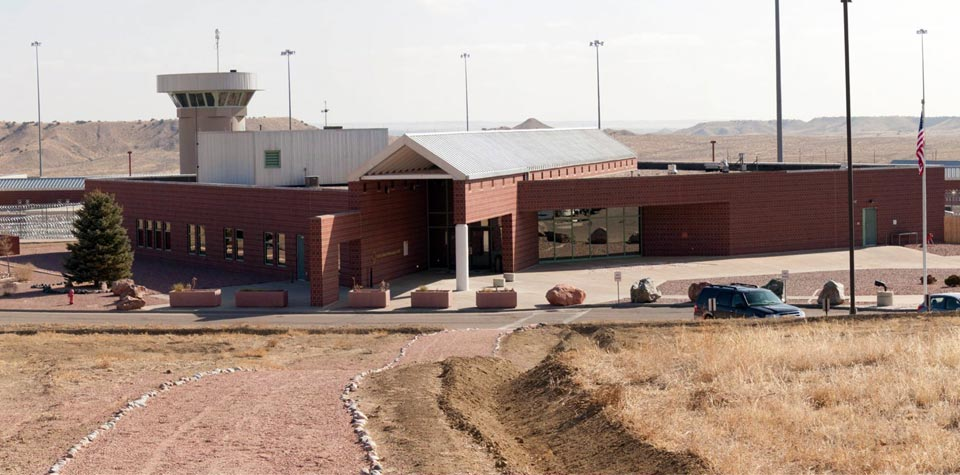
United States Penitentiary, Florence ADX, where he was incarcerated

On May 16, 2001, Hanssen was indicted in the Eastern District of Virginia by a federal grand jury on 20 counts of espionage and 1 count of conspiracy to commit espionage. Represented by Washington, D.C. lawyer Plato Cacheris, on May 31, Hanssen pleaded not guilty to 20 counts of espionage and 1 count of Conspiracy to commit espionage. A jury trial was scheduled for Hanssen on October 29. On June 14, Hanssen's attorney Plato Cacheris negotiated a plea bargain that enabled Hanssen to avoid the death penalty in exchange for cooperating with authorities. On July 6, he pleaded guilty to 13 counts of espionage, one count of attempted espionage, and one of conspiracy to commit espionage in the U.S. District Court for the Eastern District of Virginia. On May 10, 2002, Hanssen was sentenced to 15 concurrent sentences of life in prison without the possibility of parole. "I apologize for my behavior. I am shamed by it," Hanssen told U.S. District Judge Claude Hilton. "I have opened the door for calumny against my totally innocent wife and children. I have hurt so many deeply."

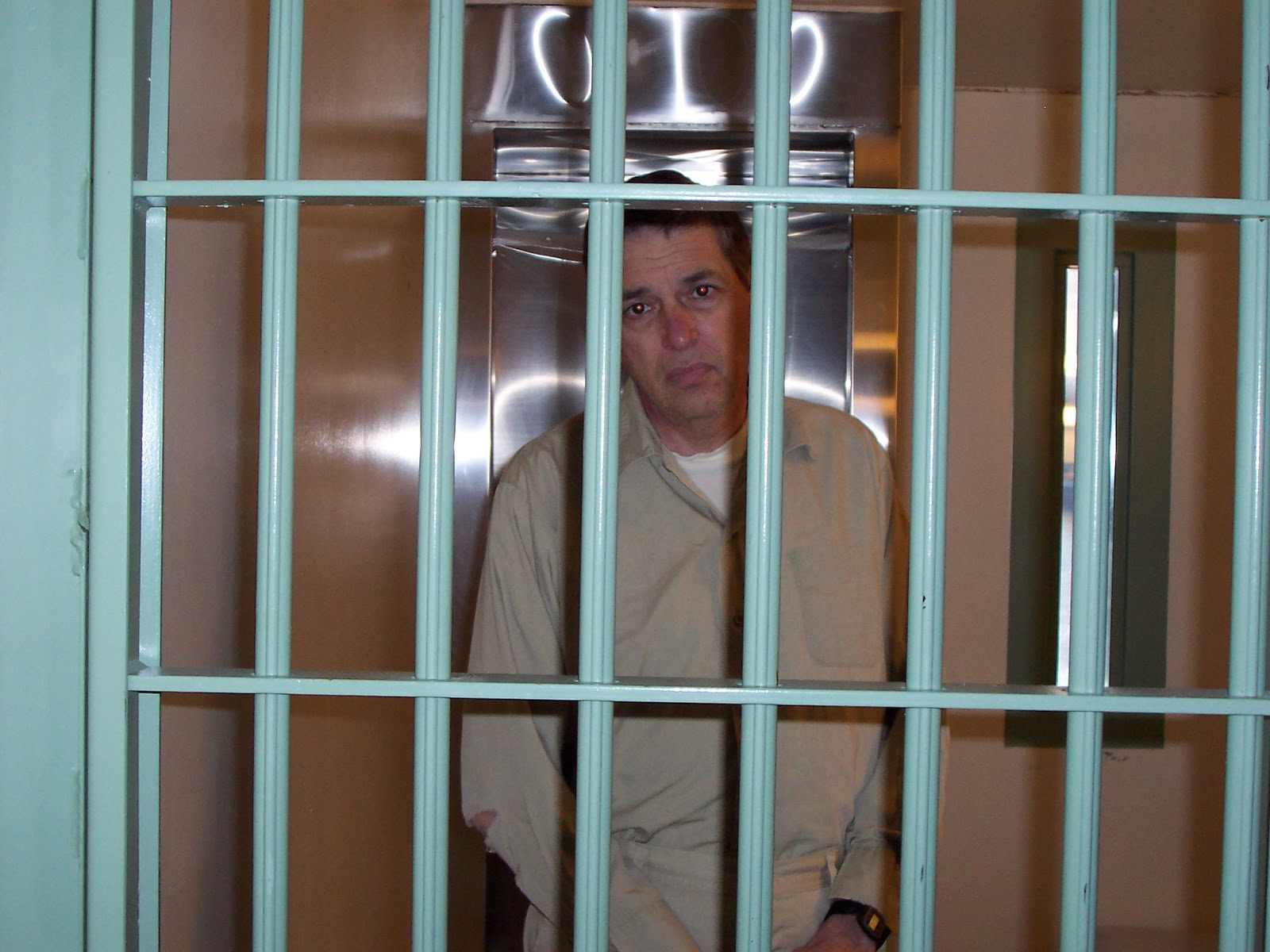
In his cell at ADX Florence

Hanssen was Federal Bureau of Prisons (FBOP) prisoner #48551-083. From July 17, 2002, until his death on June 5, 2023, he served his sentence at the ADX Florence, a federal supermax prison near Florence, Colorado, in solitary confinement for 23 hours a day.

== Modus operandi ==
Hanssen never told the KGB or GRU his identity and refused to meet them personally, except for the abortive 1993 contact in the Russian embassy parking garage. The FBI believes that the Russians never knew the name of their source. Going by the alias "Ramon" or "Ramon Garcia", Hanssen exchanged intelligence and payments through an old-fashioned dead drop system in which he and his KGB handlers left packages in public, unobtrusive places. He refused to use the dead drop sites that his handler, Victor Cherkashin, suggested and instead chose his own. He also designated a code to be used when dates were exchanged. Six was to be added to the month, day, and time of a designated drop, so that, for example, a drop scheduled for January 6 at 1:00 p.m. would be written as July 12 at 7:00 p.m.

Despite these efforts at caution and security, Hanssen was sometimes reckless. He once said in a letter to the KGB that it should emulate the management style of Mayor of Chicago Richard J. Daley—a comment that easily could have led an investigator to look at people from Chicago. Hanssen took the risk of recommending to his handlers that they try to recruit his closest friend, a colonel in the United States Army.

== Personal life ==
According to USA Today, those who knew the Hanssens described them as a close family. They attended Mass weekly and were very active in Opus Dei. Hanssen's three sons attended The Heights School in Potomac, Maryland, an all-boys preparatory school. His three daughters attended Oakcrest School for Girls in Vienna, Virginia, an independent Roman Catholic school. Both schools are associated with Opus Dei. Hanssen's wife, Bonnie, retired from teaching theology at Oakcrest in 2020.

A priest at Oakcrest said Hanssen had regularly attended a 6:30 a.m. daily Mass for over a decade. Opus Dei Reverend Father C. John McCloskey said he also occasionally attended the daily noontime Mass at the Catholic Information Center in downtown Washington, D.C.. After being imprisoned, Hanssen claimed he periodically admitted his espionage to priests in confession. He urged fellow Catholics in the FBI to attend Mass more often and denounced the Russians as "godless", even as he was spying for them.

At Hanssen's suggestion, and without his wife's knowledge, a friend named Jack Hoschouer, a retired Army officer, would sometimes watch the Hanssens having sex through a bedroom window. Hanssen then began to videotape his sexual encounters secretly and shared the videotapes with Hoschouer. Later, he hid a video camera in the bedroom connected via a closed-circuit television line so that Hoschouer could observe the Hanssens from the Hanssens' guest bedroom. He also explicitly described the sexual details of his marriage in Internet chat rooms, giving information sufficient for those who knew them to recognize the couple.

Hanssen frequently visited D.C. strip clubs and spent a great deal of time with a Washington stripper named Priscilla Sue Galey. She went with Hanssen on visits to Hong Kong and the FBI training facility in Quantico, Virginia. Hanssen gave her money, jewels, and a used Mercedes-Benz but ended contact with her before his arrest when she began abusing drugs and engaging in prostitution. Galey claims that although she offered to have sex with him, Hanssen declined, saying he was trying to convert her to Catholicism.

=== Death ===
On June 5, 2023, Hanssen was found unresponsive in his prison cell and was pronounced dead after unsuccessful efforts to revive him. His autopsy listed the cause of death as colon cancer.

== In the media ==
The Hanssen spy case was told in David Wise's book Spy: The Inside Story of How the FBI's Robert Hanssen Betrayed America, published by Random House in 2002. The investigation was further covered in Eric O'Neill's memoir Gray Day: My Undercover Mission to Expose America's First Cyber Spy, published by Penguin Random House in the spring of 2019.

Hanssen was the subject of a 2002 made-for-television movie, Master Spy: The Robert Hanssen Story, with a teleplay by Norman Mailer and starring William Hurt as Hanssen. Hanssen's jailers allowed him to watch the movie, but he was so angered by it that he turned it off.

O'Neill's role in the capture of Robert Hanssen was dramatized in the 2007 movie Breach, in which Chris Cooper played the role of Hanssen and Ryan Phillippe played O'Neill.

The 2007 documentary Superspy: The Man Who Betrayed the West describes the hunt to trap Hanssen.

Hanssen was mentioned in chapter 5 of Dan Brown's book The Da Vinci Code as the most noted Opus Dei member to non-members. His sexual deviancy and espionage conviction hurt the organization's reputation.

The U.S. Court TV (now TruTV) television series Mugshots released an episode on the Robert Hanssen case titled "Robert Hanssen – Hanssen and the KGB". Ronald Kessler's book The Secrets of the FBI, briefly covers the case in chapter 15, "Catching Hanssen", chapter 16, "Breach", and chapter 17, "Unexplained Cash", based in part on interviews with Michael Rochford, who directed the FBI team that located the former KGB source that pointed to Hanssen after Rochford initially wrongly assumed CIA officer Brian Kelley was the master spy. Hanssen's story was featured in episode 4, under the name of "Perfect Traitor", of Smithsonian Channel's series Spy Wars, which aired at the end of 2019 and was narrated by Damian Lewis, and features Eric O'Neill as well as being mentioned in the seventh episode of The History Channel series America's Book of Secrets, as well as in the fifth episode of Netflix series Spycraft and was the subject of the 2021 documentary A Spy in the FBI. He was also the subject of the CBS News podcast detailing his life and espionage, Agent of Betrayal: The Double Life of Robert Hanssen.

== References and further reading ==
- Cherkashin, Victor; Feifer, Gregory (2005). Spy Handler: Memoir of a KGB Officer – The True Story of the Man Who Recruited Robert Hanssen and Aldrich Ames. Basic Books. ISBN 0-465-00969-7.
- Fine, Glenn A. (2003). "A Review of the FBI's Performance in Deterring, Detecting, and Investigating the Espionage Activities of Robert Philip Hanssen". U.S. Department of Justice, Office of the Inspector General. Archived from the original on February 8, 2005.; PDF Version Archived April 16, 2005, at the Wayback Machine (Archive)
- Havill, Adrian (2002). The Spy Who Stayed Out in the Cold: The Secret Life of FBI Double Agent Robert Hanssen. St. Martin's Paperbacks. ISBN 0-312-98629-7.
- Lynch, Christopher (2010). The C. I. Desk: FBI and CIA Counterintelligence As Seen From My Cubicle. Dog Ear Publishing. ISBN 978-1-60844-739-8.
- O'Neill, Eric (2019). Gray Day: My Undercover Mission to Expose America's First Cyber Spy. Crown. ISBN 978-0-525-57353-1.
- Russo, Gus; Dezenhall, Eric (2018). Best of Enemies: The Last Great Spy Story of the Cold War. Twelve. ISBN 978-1538761311.
- Schiller, Lawrence (2004). Into The Mirror: The Life Of Master Spy Robert P. Hanssen. Diane Pub Co. ISBN 0-7567-7435-7.
- Shannon, Elaine; Blackman, Ann (2002). The Spy Next Door: The Extraordinary Secret Life of Robert Philip Hanssen, the Most Damaging FBI Agent in U.S. History. Little, Brown and Co. ISBN 0-316-71821-1.
- Vise, David A. (2001). The Bureau and the Mole: The Unmasking of Robert Philip Hanssen, the Most Dangerous Double Agent in FBI History. Grove Publishers. ISBN 0-641-57998-5.
- Vise, David A. (January 6, 2002). "From Russia With Love". The Washington Post. Archived from the original on February 1, 2023.
- Wise, David (2003). Spy: The Inside Story of How the FBI's Robert Hanssen Betrayed America. Random House Publishers. ISBN 0-375-75894-1.
