= Special Surveillance Group =

Special unit of the American FBI

The Special Surveillance Group (SSG) is a highly classified unit of "investigative specialists", distinct from special agents, within the US Federal Bureau of Investigation that specialize in clandestine vehicular and foot surveillance of foreign nationals and U.S. citizens known or suspected of engaging in espionage or terrorism in the U.S. and elsewhere. Investigative specialists are not armed, and do not make arrests. Informally they have been called "G's".

Prospective investigative specialists attend nine weeks of specialized training at the FBI Academy in Quantico, Virginia. They carry FBI credentials and badges, and conduct investigative work alongside special agents and intelligence analysts.
