= Mariner Books =

Publishing imprint of HarperCollins

- Parent company: HarperCollins
- Founded: 1997
- Country of origin: United States
- Headquarters location: Boston
- Publication types: Books
- Official website: www.harpercollins.com/pages/marinerbooks

Mariner Books, originally an imprint of HMH Books, was established in 1997 as a publisher of fiction, non-fiction, and poetry in trade paperback. Mariner is also the publisher of the Harvest backlist, formerly published by Harcourt Brace/Harcourt Brace Jovanovich. HarperCollins bought HMH in May 2021 for US$349 million. As of fall 2021, Mariner Books was listed as an imprint of HarperCollins.

== List of books published ==
- The Hobbit by J.R.R Tolkien (1937)
- The Fellowship of the Ring by J.R.R Tolkien (1954)
- The Two Towers by J.R.R Tolkien (1954)
- The Return of the King by J.R.R Tolkien
- The Man in the High Castle, by Philip K. Dick (1962)
- The Castle of Crossed Destinies, by Italo Calvino, Translated by William Weaver, 1979.
- If on a winter's night a traveler, by Italo Calvino, Translated by William Weaver, 1982.
- Downhill All the Way: An autobiography of the Years 1919 - 1939 by Leonard Woolf, 1989.
- The Blue Flower, by Penelope Fitzgerald (1997)
- 101 Things You Don't Know About Science and No one Else Does Either by James Trefil (1997) ISBN 0-395-87740-7
- Suspicious River, Laura Kasischke (1997) (adapted into a film of the same name)
- Fasting, Feasting by Anita Desai (1999) ISBN 0-618-06582-2
- Becoming Madame Mao, Anchee Min (2001)
- The Namesake by Jhumpa Lahiri (2003) ISBN 0-618-48522-8
- The Best Day the Worst Day: Life with Jane Kenyon by Donald Hall (2005) ISBN 0-618-77362-2
- The Every Boy by Dana Adam Shapiro (2005) ISBN 0-618-77340-1
- The Last Gentleman Adventurer: Coming of Age in the Arctic by Edward Beauclerk Maurice (2005) ISBN 0-618-77358-4
- Generation Rx: How Prescription Drugs Are Altering American Lives, Minds, and Bodies by Greg Critser (2005) ISBN 0-618-77356-8
- The Declaration of Independent Filmmaking: An Insider's Guide to Making Movies Outside of Hollywood, The Polish brothers and Jonathan Sheldon. (2005) ISBN 978-0-15-602952-0
- Afterlands: A Novel by Steven Heighton (2006) ISBN 0-618-13934-6
- Fun Home: A Family Tragicomic by Alison Bechdel (2006) ISBN 0-618-87171-3
- My Latest Grievance by Elinor Lipman (2006) ISBN 0-618-87235-3
- The Worst Hard Time: The Untold Story of Those Who Survived the Great American Dust Bowl by Timothy Egan (2006) ISBN 0-618-77347-9
- Extremely Loud & Incredibly Close by Jonathan Safran Foer (2005)
- The Canon: A Whirligig Tour of the Beautiful Basics of Science by Natalie Angier (2007) ISBN 0-547-05346-0
- Just a Couple of Days by Tony Vigorito (2007) ISBN 0-15-603122-1
- Lately by Sara Pritchard (2007) ISBN 0-618-61004-9
- Hunting Eichmann by Neal Bascomb
- Ramshackle Ode by Keith Leonard (2016) ISBN 978-0544649675
- The 2020 Commission Report on the North Korean Nuclear Attacks Against the United States by Jeffrey Lewis
- Lessons From the Edge: A Memoir by Marie Yovanovitch (2022) ISBN 978-0-35-845754-1
- No Ordinary Assignment: A Memoir by Jane Ferguson (2023) ISBN 978-0-06-327224-8
- A Council of Dolls by Mona Susan Power (2023)
- The Mission: The CIA in the 21st Century by Tim Weiner. (2025). ISBN 978-0-063270183
