= Clear Light of Day =

1980 novel by Anita Desai

Cover of the first American edition of Clear Light of Day by Anita Desai (1980)

Clear Light of Day is a novel published in 1980 by Indian novelist and three-time Booker Prize finalist Anita Desai. Set primarily in Old Delhi, the story describes the tensions in a post-partition Indian family, starting with the characters as adults and moving back into their lives throughout the course of the novel. While the primary theme is the importance of family, other predominant themes include the importance of forgiveness, the power of childhood and the status of women, particularly their role as mothers and caretakers, in modern-day India.

In 2022, the novel was included on the "Big Jubilee Read" list of 70 books by Commonwealth authors, selected to celebrate the Platinum Jubilee of Elizabeth II.

== Plot summary ==
The novel is split into four sections covering the Das family from the children's perspective in this order: adulthood, adolescence and early adulthood, childhood, and a final return to an adult perspective in the final chapter.

The story centres on the Das family, who have grown apart with adulthood. Part one starts with Tara, whose husband Bakul is India's ambassador to the US, greeting her sister Bimla (Bim), who lives in the family's Old Delhi home, teaching history and taking care of their autistic brother Baba. Their conversation eventually comes to Raja, their brother who lives in Hyderabad. Bim, not wanting to go to the wedding of Raja's daughter, shows Tara an old letter from when Raja became her landlord, in which he unintentionally insulted her after the death of his father-in-law, also the previous landlord, Hyder Ali. The section closes with the two sisters visiting the neighbours, the Misras.

In part two of the novel, the setting switches to partition-era India, when the characters are adolescents in the house. Raja is severely ill with tuberculosis and is left to Bim's ministrations. Aunt Mira ("Mira-masi "), their supposed caretaker after the death of the children's often absent parents, dies of alcoholism. Earlier, Raja's fascination with Urdu attracts the attention of the family's Muslim landlord, Hyder Ali, whom Raja idolises. After recovering from TB, Raja follows Hyder Ali to Hyderabad. Tara escapes from the situation through marriage to Bakul, leaving Bim to provide for Baba alone, in the midst of the partition and the death of Gandhi.

In part three Bim, Raja and Tara are depicted awaiting the birth of their brother Baba in pre-partition India. Aunt Mira, widowed by her husband and mistreated by her in-laws, is brought in to help with Baba, who is autistic, and to raise the children. Raja is fascinated with poetry. He shares a close bond with Bim, the head girl at school, although they often exclude Tara. Tara wants to be a mother, although this fact brings ridicule from Raja and Bim, who want to be heroes.

The fourth part returns to modern India and shows Tara confronting Bim over Raja's daughter's wedding and Bim's broken relationship with Raja. This climaxes when Bim explodes at Baba. After her anger fades, she decides that family love is irreplaceable and can cover all wrongs. After Tara leaves, she goes to her neighbors the Misras for a concert, where she is touched by the unbreakable relationship they seem to have. She tells Tara to come back from the wedding with Raja and forgives him.

== Background ==
Desai considers Clear Light of Day her most autobiographical work as it is set during her own coming of age and also in the same neighbourhood in which she grew up. She describes herself as placing "a premium on setting", unlike other Indian writers.

== Historical setting ==
=== Partition ===
The book is set at various times around the partition in Old Delhi. The tension between Muslims and Hindus are clearly shown by the father's refusal to allow Raja to go to a Muslim university and study Urdu literature because he has cause to fear for his safety. The book also mentions the partition riots as well as the refugee camps. It also depicts the flight of the Alis, the Das's Muslim landlords and neighbours.

These tensions often escalated into riots, but not in Old Delhi. The Hindus' claim to India led to the neglect, abuse and often violence towards Muslims in India or Hindus in Pakistan. The nation of India was torn apart in a violent manner, leaving refugees on both side of the border and mutual anger and hostility.

=== Delhi ===
In the book, Old Delhi is frequently referred to as old, stagnant, or decaying. Old Delhi is overcrowded and generally overlooked in favour of New Delhi. New Delhi is considered vibrant, modern and alive. In the book New Delhi is where the characters, specifically Bakul, go to avoid the soporific effects of Old Delhi or even to be connected with the outside world. Bim is in New Delhi when she hears of Gandhi death, and Raja finds diversion and entertainment as a teenager in New Delhi.

=== Religious ===
The religious undercurrents in the book manifest themselves in two ways: the partition and Raja's relationship with the Alis. As a young adult he found acceptance (albeit not inclusion) in Hyder Ali's nightly gatherings. His fascination with the Muslim culture, however, first manifests itself when he takes Urdu instead of Hindi, a language he considers banal, at school. Eventually he integrates himself into the Muslim culture and marries Hyder Ali's daughter, Benazir. However this relationship is strained during the partition and the Ali's subsequent flight to Hyderabad.

== Symbolism and motifs ==
=== Education ===
During the book education is mentioned a lot. Not just school, but also in the nightly gatherings at the Ali's. Raja and Bim both go to college, although Raja's education is much more prominent. Even Hyderabad, where he went following the Alis, is a considered a place of learning in India; it is the home of universities such as Osmania University, one of the oldest in India. Raja symbolizes culture refinement and knowledge, as does poetry.

=== Music ===
The primary manifestations of music in the book are Baba's gramophone, Dr. Biswas's musical inclinations, and Mulk's singing at the end of the book. The idea of music relating to life experiences is present. Baba constantly playing his gramophone at the same volume with the same records shows the stagnation of his development. Dr. Biswas refinement in musical taste shows the personal refinement he learned in Europe. Mulk and the Guru show that while life alters our experiences, we are still the same people; as they used the same style but with different experiences shaping their performance. This is confirmed by Mulk complaining about his sisters sending away his musicians, like the partition of India. But the musicians return at the end of the book to accompany Mulk.

Tara also mentions her daughters' music but says it develops with their growth.

Of particular interest is what music Desai has Baba play; all the records are from the same time period and he never gets any new ones. But the most potent of these songs seems to be "Don't Fence Me In", performed by Bing Crosby. Every primary character in the book with the exception of Bim finds some way to escape. A song about being free, however, is what angers the one character who, on the surface, had no desire to do so.

=== Separation ===
The novel tells not just the story of the separation of a family, but also of a nation. The partition of India is a tangible reality that is concurrent to Raja leaving, Tara marrying, the deaths of the Das parents as well as Aunt Mira, and the separation of the Das family. These familial separations are parallel to the social events leading up to Partition and to the continued social upheaval that followed the separation of Pakistan from India.

The summer of 1947 is described as tumultuous: it is the summer when Bim takes care of Raja in his illness, the Hyder Ali family abandons Delhi for Hyderabad under the threat of ethnic violence, and the father of the Das family dies. During the previous summer of 1946, the same summer that Jinnah made public demands for a Muslim homeland, the mother of the Das family had also died. The dissolution in the family that begins in 1946 parallels the growing Partition movement and the escalation of violence, such as the attacks in Calcutta in August 1946, in response to this division into two nations. In the summer of 1947, Tara marries Bakul and they leave for Ceylon (Sri Lanka), leaving Bim alone to care for the remaining family members: this coincides with the official division of India from Pakistan in August of that same year. The following summer, after the assassination of Gandhi earlier in January 1948 and the continued flight of refugees across Indian borders, Aunt Mira dies and Raja leaves for Hyderabad, thus isolating Bim further and leaving her to care for those who are left behind: Baba and herself. In particular, each of the three people who escaped (Tara, Raja and Aunt Mira) used a way of escape common during the Partition era: Tara fled the country for somewhere else, Raja fled to a Muslim center, and Aunt Mira left the earthly life entirely.

=== Language ===
Each of the languages in Clear Light of Day represents different things. Urdu is the language of culture, refinement and knowledge. Hindi is considered every day, mundane and banal. Additionally the repeated examples of poetry emphasise the beauty of the one language compared to the other as more often than not they are in Urdu. Raja expounds how an Urdu poet could do that in a single couplet. Urdu symbolizes Raja and the Ali's culture and sophistication.

=== Nature ===
Nature is omnipresent in Anita Desai's Clear Light of Day. The children are constantly in the garden to escape the stuffy interior. Gatherings happen outside, such as at Hyder Ali's house and the Misra's; Tara's guilt is physically represented by bees; Nature is present even on clothes and in the poetry that Bim and Raja recite. It is significant that the novel begins with a description of the garden ("the koels began to call before daylight"), and Anita Desai clearly places an emphasis on setting. Nature in the novel is a source of entertainment, but more significantly, it is often analogous to the relationships and actions of the characters.

The first function of Nature in the novel is as a source of entertainment and learning for the Das children. The first instance of this is when Tara, at the very beginning of the story, thinking she has seen a pearl, finds a snail instead and plays with it, as she did when they were children, performing "the rites of childhood over the creature". A few pages later, Tara muses over the "rustic pleasures" that she used to derive from the garden, longing to run to the guava trees and find a whole one to bite into. The garden is their source of refreshment in the heat of summer, and the nature filled surroundings provide Tara with reprieve from the business of her city life. The garden is "overgrown", "neglected" and "uncontrolled", not perfect and square, so she feels like she can relax and forget about her engagement book. It also shows the contrast between Tara and Bim.

Nature's second function in the novel is to mirror or complement the actions or feelings of the characters in the book. Many paragraphs end with a reference to Nature, such as "the dog suddenly pounced upon the flea" or "a koel lifted itself out of the heavy torpor of the afternoon and called tentatively, as if enquiring into the existence of the evening". This offers a parallel between what has just happened in the story and the natural world. The dog pounces on the flea immediately after Bakul tells Bim that he will marry Tara, and could represent Bim's isolation beginning to trap her. The koel calls tentatively after Bim has come to an understanding of herself and her relationship with her family and is finally at peace. It could be seen as her uplifting rebirth. Another parallel we can find is the heat of the summer and the political heat of 1947. The most important analogy between Nature and the human world is the garden. At the beginning of the novel, the roses are said to have grown smaller and sicker; they are "dusted with disease". At the end of the novel, there is a dust storm which mirrors the discussion Bim and Tara are having about Raja, and which leaves the garden "shrouded in dust" and everything looking "ancient and bent". The garden, so beautiful and enjoyable in their childhood, has become old and grey as the years have progressed and the Das children have grown apart. Nature in the novel is also beautiful and dangerous at the same time. For example, mosquitoes are mentioned at the beginning as "singing and stinging", and when the gardener waters the garden, "bringing out the green scent of watered earth and refreshed plants", mynahs quarrel and parrots come, a "lurid, shrieking green", ripping flowers to bits. This carries a warning and can be compared with human relationships, especially the relationship between Tara, Bim and Raja.

Finally, Nature is used as a point of comparison with the characters themselves. There is a long metaphor in which Aunt Mira and the children are compared to plants and trees, Aunt Mira being the "tree that grew at the centre of their lives": "Soon they grew tall, soon they grew strong. They wrapped themselves around her, smothering her in leaves and flowers. She laughed at the profusion, the beauty of this little grove that was the whole forest to her, the whole world. (…) she would just be the old log, the dried mass of roots on which they grew. She was the tree, she was the soil, she was the earth." This metaphor is continued when Baba is compared to a "plant grown underground", emphasizing the difference between him and his siblings. It also contrasts with the image that we are given of the Das parents. The roses in the garden were supposedly planted by the father, but neither he nor the gardener knew how to take care of them, so although beautiful at first, they withered. The fact that Tara doesn't know for sure that her father planted them compares with his constant absence in his children's lives. Like the roses, the Das children were not properly cared for which has led them to bicker and row, ultimately failing to understand each other. The cow, warm and soft, can also be seen as the Das parents trying to offer comfort and nourishment to their children, but the cow, like the Das parents and Aunt Mira, dies, leaving the children alone, Raja and Tara longing to escape and Bim bitter. Additionally, both Aunt Mira and Tara are compared to birds, at different moments in the book. Aunt Mira, weak with alcoholism, "almost ceased to be human, became bird instead, and old bird with its feathers plucked, its bones jutting out from under the blue tinged skin, too antique, too crushed to move." Tara, when Bim cuts off her hair, looks "like a baby pigeon fallen out of its nest, blue-skinned and bristly, crouching behind the water tank and crying". The idea of a bird too weak to fly is an accurate representation of Aunt Mira, widowed and rejected, and Tara, who is an introvert with no grand ambitions. It seems to point to what Tara might have become without Bakul, and adds to the contrast between the two sisters.

=== Other motifs and symbolism ===
- Birds
- Flowers (Roses)
- Duality (Light and Dark)
- Stagnation
- Women in India
- The passage of Time

== Themes ==
=== Family ===
Bim's breakdown at the end of the book results in remarkable clarity of thought. In this insight, she concludes that the bond of family is greater than any other thing in this world, that she felt their pains, and that she couldn't live without them.

=== Forgiveness ===
Bim's inability to forgive Raja demonstrates that the deepest hurts come from the closest bonds. However she does find it in herself at the end of the book to forgive Raja for the insult and realize the importance of family.

=== Adolescence ===
A major a part of the book is devoted to the first years of the Das siblings and to how that period shaped their current lives. While Bim and Raja, being the eldest siblings, were sure of themselves, Tara and Baba were left behind, although loved, dependent—albeit in several ways— on others. the youngsters were rarely cared for in their household, then they constantly searched for affection from one another. Their experiences in adolescence were liable for their future selves, including their oft-tense relations with one another. Raja, who was selfish and proud, becomes an upscale, pompous man who remains trying to be the hero he idolized, Hyder Ali. Tara is consistently hooked in to her husband et al. to form decisions for her. Bim witnesses the degradation of her widowed aunt in her house and therefore the limitations of marriage, and she or he decides to measure a lifetime of independence.

=== Escapism ===
The Das siblings are constantly trying to flee their immediate surroundings. This need is fuelled by the shortage of attention they get from their parents. Raja starts inclining towards Islamic culture against his family’s wishes, Tara first seeks attention from Mira Masi and starts to spend longer with the Misra sisters, ultimately marrying Bakul and leaving Delhi . Baba also tries to flee his immediate surroundings, albeit during a more unconscious manner, by constantly playing an equivalent music on a loop. These three characters are propelled by the necessity to repress unpleasant memories of their childhood. Bim appears to be the sole one that doesn't want to flee her family. However, because the story progresses, one sees through chinks in Bim's armour. She is consistently hurt by her siblings and wishes to escape—this time, ironically, into the past.

== Poetry in Clear Light of Day ==
In this book, Desai quotes poems 12 different times, in addition to using a line by Iqbal as a part of a song at the end of the book. Poets quoted include T. S. Eliot (The Waste Land and Burnt Norton), Alfred, Lord Tennyson (Now Sleeps the Crimson Petal, Now the White), Lord Byron (Isles of Greece) Sir Muhammad Iqbal ("Thou didst create...into an antidote", and "Your world is the world...over my world you have dominion") Algernon Charles Swinburne (The Garden of Proserpine) and D. H. Lawrence (Ship of Death). The poetry each serves to convey not only a particular aspect involved in the poem, but also the importance of education.

== Awards and reception ==
In 1980 Clear Light of Day was shortlisted for the Man Booker Prize, although it did not win.

== See also ==
- Burnt Norton
- Fasting, Feasting
- In Custody
- The Village by the Sea
