= Legacy of Ashes =

2007 book by Tim Weiner

Legacy of Ashes: The History of the CIA
- Author: Tim Weiner
- Language: English
- Subject: Central Intelligence Agency
- Genre: Non-fiction
- Publisher: Doubleday
- Publication date: 2007
- Publication place: United States
- Pages: 702 pp (first edition)
- ISBN: 978-0-385-51445-3
- OCLC: 82367780
- Dewey Decimal: 327.1273009 22
- LC Class: JK468.I6 W44 2007

Legacy of Ashes: The History of the CIA is a 2007 book by Tim Weiner. Legacy of Ashes won the 2007 National Book Award for Nonfiction. The book received mixed receptions, generally positive by journalists and negative by scholars of intelligence studies.

The successor to this book is entitled The Mission: The CIA in the 21st Century, also by the same author, Tim Weiner.

== Title ==
The title of the book comes from a misrepresented quotation from U.S. president Dwight D. Eisenhower during a meeting of the National Security Council (NSC) in 1961. Weiner incorrectly attributes the phrase "legacy of ashes" to Eisenhower's assessment of the CIA's performance under his administration. However, the January 5, 1961 meeting of the NSC focused on perceived redundancies in each military service's intelligence arms. As described by the meeting notes:

"The President then remarked that soon after Pearl Harbor, he was engaged in an operation which required him to have certain information which he was unable to obtain from the Navy, i.e. the strength the Navy had left in the Pacific. The President also noted that the U.S. fought the first year of the war in Europe entirely on the basis of British intelligence. Subsequently, each Military Service developed its own intelligence organization. He thought this situation made little sense in managerial terms. He had suffered an eight-year defeat on this question but would leave a legacy of ashes for his successor."

David M. Barrett observes that "as more than one reviewer of Weiner's book has shown, Eisenhower was not talking about the CIA; he was addressing another subject altogether—the fact that each branch of the US military had its own intelligence agency, and the failure during his administration to centralize that ongoing, wasteful, inefficient military intelligence setup. (John F. Kennedy and Robert McNamara would have a solution, of sorts, in creating the Defense Intelligence Agency in 1961)."

== Reception ==
=== The CIA ===
In a press release coinciding with the book's release, the CIA claimed: "With a strong range of sources, Tim Weiner had an opportunity to write a balanced history of a complex, important subject. But he did not. His bias overwhelms his scholarship. One cannot learn the true story of the CIA from Legacy of Ashes."

=== Journalists and academics ===
David Wise, coauthor of The Invisible Government, faulted Weiner for portraying Allen Dulles as "a doddering old man in carpet slippers" rather than the "shrewd professional spy" he knew and for refusing "to concede that the agency's leaders may have acted from patriotic motives or that the CIA ever did anything right," but concluded: "Legacy of Ashes succeeds as both journalism and history, and it is must reading for anyone interested in the CIA or American intelligence since World War II."

Despite favorable reception among journalists, some intelligence specialists were relatively critical of Weiner's work. Loch K. Johnson and Rhodri Jeffreys-Jones wrote that "as for scholars, the consensus seems to be that the work lacks both objectivity and thorough research"; James Callanan states that "What is also clear is the inaccuracy of Tim Weiner's description of a CIA that subverted its own mission ... There is, in fact, little evidence to suggest that the agency behaved as a rogue elephant"; Jeffrey T. Richelson of the National Security Archive at George Washington University describes the book as "a profoundly tendentious and unreliable guide to the overall history of the CIA"; and CIA in-house historian Nicholas Dujmovic opines that "The errors of fact in Legacy of Ashes are numerous and of the kind that a half-way diligent graduate student would spot." According to Johnson and Jeffreys-Jones, Weiner "seem[s] to have no knowledge at all of the solid academic work on intelligence that scholars have published."

Daniel Byman acknowledges CIA errors such as the failure to predict the Soviet invasion of Afghanistan and an erroneous 2002 assessment regarding Iraqi possession of weapons of mass destruction, but states that Weiner's analysis of CIA mistakes is often "simplistic, cherry-picked, and overblown" and omits the "broader structural, cognitive, and political explanations of success and failure".
