= In My Time: A Personal and Political Memoir =

2011 nonfiction book by Dick Cheney

- Book cover
- Author: Dick Cheney with Liz Cheney
- Language: English
- Subject: Dick Cheney
- Genre: Memoir
- Publisher: Simon & Schuster
- Publication date: August 30, 2011
- Publication place: United States
- Media type: Hardcover
- Pages: 576
- ISBN: 1-4391-7619-1

In My Time: A Personal and Political Memoir is a memoir written by former Vice President of the United States Dick Cheney with Liz Cheney. The book was released on August 30, 2011, and outlines Cheney's accounts of 9/11, the war on terrorism, the 2001 War in Afghanistan, the run-up to the 2003 Iraq war, enhanced interrogation techniques and other events. According to Barton Gellman, the author of Angler: The Cheney Vice Presidency, Cheney's book differs from publicly available records on details surrounding the NSA surveillance program. Cheney discusses his both good and bad interactions with his peers during the Presidency of George W. Bush.

Upon the book's release, several people quoted in it such as Secretaries of State Colin Powell and Condoleezza Rice as well as U.S. Senator John McCain stated that Cheney did not accurately recount their private conversations and meetings.

== Contents ==
Cheney writes about his important role in the Bush administration

From day one George Bush made clear he wanted me to help govern ... To the extent that this created a unique arrangement in our history, with a vice president playing a significant role in the key policy issues of the day, it was George Bush's arrangement.

== Reviews ==
The Washington Post ran a negative review by associate editor Robert G. Kaiser. Kaiser praised the early sections of the book showing Cheney's "rise from humble origins" as an interesting story "briskly told." However, Kaiser argued that Cheney "avoids a great deal" in Cheney's depiction of the Bush administration. Kaiser wrote,

He never comes to grips with the fact—so frustrating to him, obviously—that Hussein had no weapons of mass destruction. He recounts aspects of his own role in stoking the fires for war but ignores many of his most famous personal gaffes.

Military historian Victor Davis Hanson praised the memoir in Defining Ideas, a journal published by the Hoover Institution, and he likened Cheney to the mythical Greek figure Ajax. Hanson remarked,

A subtext to the latter half of the memoir is that in early 2009, when Barack Obama was deemed "godlike," Cheney—out of office, ill, mostly alone, and terribly unpopular—finally went public and took on Obama's serial criticism of the Bush-Cheney anti-terrorism protocols. Those were soon to be validated when Obama embraced or expanded almost everything that Cheney had helped craft since 2001. In mythological terms, the post 9/11 Cheney was no longer a fixer like Odysseus, but became an unyielding Ajax who would rather be right than liked—or rather knew that to be right in Washington, he mostly could not be liked ... The more ill and more isolated Cheney became in the Bush administration, the more antithetical he seems to his earlier more robust and upbeat self, and the more we should admire him—in the same fashion we concede respect to the anti-heroes of classical Western films, who accept that the help that community needs in extremis will destroy the rare person who must deliver it.

== Related memoirs ==
- A Journey by Tony Blair
- At the Center of the Storm: My Years at the CIA by George Tenet
- Decision Points by George W. Bush
- Known and Unknown: A Memoir by Donald Rumsfeld
- No Ordinary Assignment: A Memoir by Jane Ferguson
- Spoken from the Heart by Laura Bush
