= Lessons From the Edge: A Memoir =

2022 memoir by Marie Yovanovitch

- 2022 dust cover image
- Author: Marie Yovanovitch
- Genre: Autobiography, Memoir, Political
- Publication date: March 2022
- Pages: 432
- ISBN: 9780063268630

Lessons From the Edge: A Memoir is a memoir by Marie Yovanovitch a former United States ambassador to Ukraine and a witness in the first Trump impeachment trial. It was published by Mariner Books in March 2022. This book was first listed as number two on the New York Times Hardcover Nonfiction Bestseller List. It later moved to number three and eight.

== See also ==
- No Ordinary Assignment: A Memoir by Jane Ferguson
- A Journey by Tony Blair
- At the Center of the Storm: My Years at the CIA by George Tenet
- Decision Points by George W. Bush
