= Vigorito =

Vigorito is a surname. Notable people with the surname include:

- Joseph P. Vigorito (1918–2003), American politician
- Mauro Vigorito (born 1990), Italian footballer
- Tommy Vigorito (1959–2025), American football player
- Tony Vigorito, American writer

== See also ==
- Stadio Ciro Vigorito, sports venue in Italy
