= Tim Weiner =

American reporter and author (born 1956)

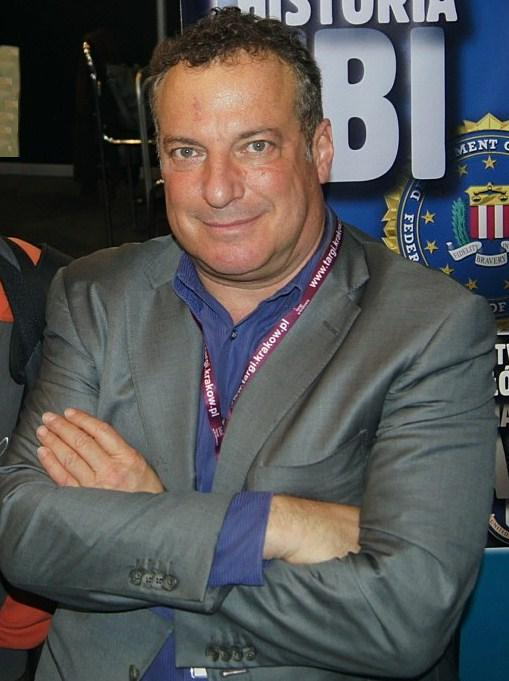
- Weiner in 2012
- Born: June 20, 1956 (age 70); White Plains, New York, U.S.
- Education: Columbia University (BA, MS)
- Occupations: journalist, author
- Writing career
- Genres: History, biography, non-fiction
- Subjects: Espionage, national security, United States foreign policy
- Notable work: Legacy of Ashes: The History of the CIA
- Notable awards: National Book Award in Nonfiction; Pulitzer Prize for National Reporting

Tim Weiner (born June 20, 1956) is an American reporter and author. He is the author of six books and co-author of a seventh, and winner of the Pulitzer Prize and National Book Award.

== Early life and education ==
Weiner was born June 20, 1956, to a Jewish family in White Plains, New York. His parents, Dora Weiner and Herbert Weiner, were both professors.

Weiner graduated from Columbia University in 1978 with a Bachelor of Arts degree in history, and from the Columbia University Graduate School of Journalism in 1979.

== Career ==
Weiner was a Washington correspondent for The Philadelphia Inquirer from 1982 to 1992, and then worked for The New York Times, from 1993 to 2009, as a foreign correspondent in Mexico, Afghanistan, Pakistan and Sudan, and as a national security correspondent in Washington, DC.

Weiner won the 1988 Pulitzer Prize for National Reporting, as an investigative reporter at The Philadelphia Inquirer, for his articles on the hidden "black budget" spending at the Pentagon and the CIA. His book Blank Check: The Pentagon's Black Budget is based on that newspaper series.

He won the National Book Award in Nonfiction for his 2007 book Legacy of Ashes: The History of the CIA.

In 2012, Weiner published Enemies: A History of the FBI, which traces the history of the FBI's secret intelligence operations, from the bureau's creation in the early 20th century through its ongoing role in the war on terrorism.

Weiner's 2020 book, The Folly and the Glory: America, Russia, and Political Warfare, 1945–2020, delves into many aspects, largely covert, of the Cold War rivalry between the United States and the Soviet Union (and its successor state, Russia). Two episodes given special attention are the CIA's role in the murder of Patrice Lumumba and U.S. support for Joseph Mobutu's kleptocracy in the Democratic Republic of the Congo in the 1960s; and Ronald Reagan's encounter with Pope John Paul II, which led to a covert program to support the Solidarity movement in Poland in the 1980s. The book received largely favorable reviews in both the New York Times and the Washington Post, with reviewer Timothy Naftali noting that "Weiner is especially adept at unearthing and explaining the covert side of it all."

In 2025, Weiner published The Mission: the CIA in the 21st Century.

== Books ==
External videos
- Booknotes interview with Weiner on Blank Check, October 1, 1990, C-SPAN
- After Words interview with Weiner on Legacy of Ashes, July 14, 2007, C-SPAN
- Q&A interview with Weiner about Enemies, March 11, 2012, C-SPAN
- Presentation by Weiner on One Man Against the World, July 30, 2015, C-SPAN

- Blank Check: The Pentagon's Black Budget. Warner Books, 1990. ISBN 978-0446514521. Based on a series of Pulitzer Prize-winning articles.
- Betrayal: The Story of Aldrich Ames, an American Spy, with Neil A. Lewis & David Johnston. Random House, 1995. ISBN 978-0679440505.
- Legacy of Ashes: The History of the CIA. Anchor Books, 2008. ISBN 978-0307389008.
- Enemies: A History of the FBI. Random House, 2012. ISBN 978-1400067480.
- One Man Against The World: The Tragedy of Richard Nixon. Macmillan, 2015. ISBN 978-1627790833.
- The Folly and the Glory: America, Russia, and Political Warfare, 1945–2020. Henry Holt and Company, 2020. ISBN 978-1627790864.
- The Mission: The CIA in the 21st Century. Mariner Books, 2025. ISBN 978-0063270183.
