= Natural Obsessions =

1988 book by Natalie Angier

- Author: Natalie Angier
- Language: English
- Genre: Non-fiction
- Publisher: Houghton Mifflin
- Publication date: 1988
- Publication place: United States

Natural Obsessions is a book written by American science author Natalie Angier published in 1988. It chronicles a year in the laboratories of two prominent cancer biologists during a period where there was a race to discover and characterize some of the first cancer-causing and cancer-suppressing genes.

== Overview ==
It chronicles the time, about a year, that she spent in the labs of two prominent cancer biologists, Robert Weinberg and Michael Wigler, during a period where there was a race to discover and characterize some of the first cancer causing and cancer-suppressing genes (oncogenes and tumor suppressor genes, respectively). Pressure to find these genes mounts and everyone is scrambling to be the first to announce this major discovery, which could have gone to several laboratories.

== Commercial and critical reception ==
Natural Obsessions was reviewed favorably in the New York Times and Smithsonian magazine in the months after its initial publication. The book was named a New York Times Notable Book for 1988.

As of 2001, the book has been used as a text in a cancer biology course at the University of Chicago and the University of Houston.

== Editions ==
- Natural Obsessions, Natalie Angier, Houghton Mifflin, 1988, 394 pp.
- Natural Obsessions, Natalie Angier, Warner Books, 1989
- Natalie Angier (1999). Natural obsessions: striving to unlock the deepest secrets of the cancer cell (reprint ed.). Mariner Books. ISBN 978-0-395-92472-3. OCLC 40715347., 420 pp.
- Natural Obsessions, Natalie Angier, Virago, 2000

== See also ==
- Ras
- Rb
