= Culture Creep =

2025 essay collection by Alice Bolin

Culture Creep: Notes on the Pop Apocalypse
- Author: Alice Bolin
- Genre: Essay collection
- Publisher: Mariner Books
- Publication date: June 3, 2025
- Pages: 272
- ISBN: 978-0063440524

Culture Creep: Notes on the Pop Apocalypse is a 2025 essay collection by Alice Bolin published by Mariner Books. In seven essays, Bolin tackles "cults, corporate thought control and the end of the world as we know it" with regard to contemporary life; other topics include feminism, internet culture, and video games. One of its essays, about Sex and the City and "feminist despair," was excerpted in Literary Hub.

== Background ==
Bolin was inspired to write her essays in order to interrogate the "nostalgia machine" which has taken root in modern culture: "There's a bigger theme about how we're living in this future that feels so much like the past... how much that reflects stagnation and economic stagnation." One point of nostalgia for Bolin was teen magazines at the turn of the millennium, which the book's first essay addresses.

She was also inspired by her time in Memphis, Tennessee, as a professor at the University of Memphis, where she and her husband were married, as well as where "her Memphis memories exist in a haze of pandemic-induced murk."

== Critical reception ==
In a starred review, Publishers Weekly called the book a "ferociously smart collection" and concluded that "Bolin's sharp analysis draws unintuitive connections between a variety of political and cultural targets, offering a caustic take on the vicissitudes of modern life. This solidifies Bolin's status as a vital chronicler of millennial ennui."

The New York Times stated that the book "may struggle to pin down a single thesis—but that's not to say Bolin doesn't have a point. The problem might be that she has too many." However, the reviewer found Bolin's essay on Animal Crossing to be the place where "Her writing shines."

The New Republic wondered if Bolin's use of "citations of academic articles and social theory" was done "to compensate for a concern that Y2K artifacts and early-2000s media are not topics serious enough to constitute an essay collection" and stated that "Bolin's insecurity as a critic appears to stem from self-consciousness about participating in the genre of female-authored criticism-cum-memoir." The reviewer thus concluded that the book was stuck within a contradiction of both self-seriousness and not.
