= The Appalachian Trail (book) =

2021 book by Philip D'Anieri

- First edition cover
- Author: Philip D'Anieri
- Subject: Appalachian Trail
- Genre: Nonfiction
- Publisher: Mariner Books
- Publication date: 2021

The Appalachian Trail: A Biography is a 2021 non-fiction book written as a biography by Philip D'Anieri. In the biography, Philip D' Anieri, who is a lecturer at University of Michigan mentions multiple personalities significant in the trail's history and also discusses the stories of the Appalachian Trail founders and their motivations.

== Reviews ==
The New York Times has referred to The Appalachian Trail as "D'Anieri's stalwart biography makes clear — that the work of humans, even a mere ribbon of dirt along an ancient ridgeline, will always bear the contradictions and complications of those whose hands — and feet — made it." Discover also wrote, "The Appalachian Trail acts as a portal into another world." Thomas Urquhart also gave a positive review, appreciating author's original approach and referred to the book as a satisfying biography at Press Herald. The book also received a starred review from Kirkus, which praised the detail and accessible tone.
