= Nine Kinds of Naked =

Nine Kinds of Naked is Tony Vigorito's second novel. Published in 2008 by Houghton Mifflin Harcourt, the major themes of the book revolve around the Jungian concept of synchronicity, chaos theory, and the Butterfly Effect. Tornadoes and hurricanes, representative of chaos, propel the storyline across its twelve centuries.

== Plot introduction ==
Vigorito wrote this book as an experiment in literary synchronicity, starting with the title and inventing the entire story day by day according to the synchronicities of his daily experience. What emerged was an exploration of the Butterfly Effect, as what initially appears to be a chaotic storyline eventually relents into a tightly-interconnected series of events linked across time, space, and meaning.

== Characters and plot summary ==
Diablo is serving a brief jail term in Normal, Illinois. One day, he happens to idly toss a playing card—the Joker—across his cell. From the scarce draft of the spinning card, a powerful tornado eventually forms that touches the lives of all the major characters, intersecting their lives in synchronistic fashion.

Billy, the guard who released Diablo from jail, gave a ride to Diablo, who was hitchhiking outside the jail. Caught in the same tornado, Billy is torn from the driver's seat and tossed into the sky. Five years later, just after quitting a job, Diablo almost runs Billy down with his car. Billy now calls himself Billy Pronto and insists that he can only speak in the present tense.

Special Agent J.J. Speed is a CIA agent and a former priest who changed his life after the tornado struck the Church in Normal, Illinois, at which he was conducting Mass. The tornado stripped him of his priestly vestments (along with the clothing of everyone else in the congregation) and sent them sailing into the sky. Twenty years later, stuck in a dead-end assignment in Playa del Carmen, Mexico, he happens across his priestly scarf—definitive as it was embroidered with his initials—being sold by a street vendor. He is shortly reassigned to New Orleans.

Elizabeth Wildhack is a dropout philosopher and a New Orleans stripper. She is the daughter of Bridget Snapdragon, who gave birth to her during the tornado that struck the Church in Normal, Illinois, just before her body disappeared into the sky. Elizabeth eventually meets Diablo, who has been selling seashell pipes on Bourbon Street for the last fifteen years, ever since he quit his job and Billy Pronto began haunting him.

A year prior to their meeting, and two days after a thermonuclear bomb test in the Rub al-Khali, an overnight hypercane formed in the Gulf of Mexico. New Orleans, still raw from Hurricane Katrina years back, flees its path, but the world is soon startled to discover that this anomalous hypercane is not moving, taking up an apparently stable position in the Gulf. This hypercane is the latest incarnation of the tornado initially spun from Diablo’s playing card, which had been a dust devil in the Rub al-Khali gradually dissipating into nothing before the thermonuclear explosion caused it to grow in strength.

Woven throughout the larger story is Clovis, runaway serf from the 9th century who stumbles upon the mythical Golden Bough, a scene which Bridget Snapdragon happened to paint on the kitchen wall while pregnant with Elizabeth. Possessed of the Golden Bough, Clovis is thereby granted solitary access to the underworld - the world beneath the illusions of time and meaning. Existing outside of time, he aspects the trickster, and amuses himself by orchestrating tremendous coincidences.

== Critical reception ==
Nine Kinds of Naked met with generally favorable reviews, with The Sacramento Book Review calling it "part quirky love story, part philosophical manifesto, and part metaphysical mystery...", The Chicago Sun-Times calling it "startlingly original," Texas Monthly calling it "a crisp, sardonic voice," and The Daily Texan calling it "a lyrical adventure." Publishers Weekly, however, observed that "the book’s time shifts, innumerable eccentricities, chaotic narrative and 400 pages are enough to wear a reader out."

== Trivia ==
This story takes place in the same fictional universe as Tony Vigorito's first novel, Just a Couple of Days. This is evidenced by intersecting scenes involving T-shirts displaying the message "Argue Naked."
