= In Custody (film) =

- Directed by: Ismail Merchant
- Written by: Anita Desai; Shahrukh Husain
- Based on: In Custody by Anita Desai
- Produced by: Wahid Chowhan; Paul Bradley (executive); Donald Rosenfeld (executive)
- Starring: Shashi Kapoor; Shabana Azmi; Om Puri; Sushma Seth; Neena Gupta; Tinnu Anand; Prayag Raj; Ajay Sahni; Maza Bi
- Cinematography: Larry Pizer
- Edited by: Roberto Silvi
- Music by: Zakir Hussain; Ustad Sultan Khan
- Distributed by: Sony Pictures Classics (USA); Mayfair (UK)
- Release dates: October 1993 (Tokyo Film Festival); 14 May 1994 (New York); 3 June 1994 (London)
- Running time: 126 minutes
- Countries: United Kingdom; India; United States
- Languages: Hindi; Urdu
- Budget: $1 million
- Box office: $0.1 million (US/UK)

In Custody (or Muhafiz) is a 1993 film by Merchant Ivory Productions. It was directed by Ismail Merchant, with screenplay by Anita Desai and Shahrukh Husain. It is based upon Desai's 1984 Booker Prize nominated novel In Custody.

== Plot synopsis ==
Deven's (Om Puri) position as a professor of Hindi at a local college is only a means to an end. His first love is the Urdu language and in particular Urdu poetry. Deven's multiple (and often stymied) attempts to interview the great Urdu poet, Nur (Shashi Kapoor), act as a metaphor for the clash between modernization and tradition.

== Cast ==
- Shashi Kapoor... Nur Shahjenabadi
- Shabana Azmi... Imtiaz Begum
- Om Puri... Deven Sharma
- Parikshat Sahni... Siddiqui
- Amjad Khan... Musician
- Sushma Seth... Safiya Begum
- Neena Gupta... Sarla Sharma (Deven's Wife)
- Tinnu Anand... Murad

== Release ==
The film opened on 3 screens in New York City on 14 May 1994 and grossed $7,701 for the weekend. It opened on 3 screens in London on 3 June 1994 and grossed £2,814 in its opening weekend. It grossed $92,612 in the United States.

== Awards ==
- 1993: Tokyo Film Festival in Kyoto (Official Selection) nomination
- 1994: National Film Award
  - Special Jury Award: Shashi Kapoor
  - Best Art Direction: Suresh Sawant

== Musicians and vocalists ==
- Sultan Khan - sarangi
- Sunil Das - sitar
- Ulhas Bapat - santoor
- Ronu Majumdar - flute
- Fazal Qureshi - tabla
- Taufiq Qureshi - percussion
- Pyush Kanojia - keyboard
- Zakir Hussain - tabla
- Sadiq Qureshi - daf

Vocalists

- Suresh Wadkar, Kavita Krishnamurthy, Hariharan, Shankar Mahadevan

The film also features poetry by Faiz Ahmad Faiz.
