= The Artist of Disappearance =

2011 book by Anita Desai

- Author: Anita Desai
- Language: English
- Publisher: Chatto & Windus
- Publication date: 2011
- Publication place: India
- Media type: Hardcover, paperback, e-book
- Pages: 156
- Awards: PEN/Faulkner Award for Fiction finalist 2012
- ISBN: 9780701186203
- OCLC: 751789000

The Artist of Disappearance is a collection of novellas by Indian writer Anita Desai. It was published in the UK by Chatto & Windus in 2011, and was a finalist for the PEN/Faulkner Award for Fiction in 2012.

The book includes three novellas: The Museum of Final Journeys, Translator Translated and The Artist of Disappearance. Maggie Gee described the volume as a "brilliant miniature exposé of contemporary culture" in her review in The Guardian. The main themes of the book are the representation of what is vanishing and disappearing, the art of translation, and environmental destruction.

The Museum of Final Journeys narrates the story of a collapsing art collection in a remote province of India. The novella addresses the theme of the ruin and the possibilities of connecting past and present through the art of narration.

Translator Translated deals with a troubled relationship between a writer and her translator, and what happens when the translator violates her position and role.

The Artist of Disappearance is about Ravi, a mysterious artist who lives in solitude in contact with nature, whose life is disturbed by the arrival of a film crew planning to document environmental destruction in the region. As Razia Iqbal writes in Wasafiri, the novella addresses the effects of rapid industrialization in India and the question of how the writer should represent this process.
