= The Zigzag Way =

2004 novel by Anita Desai

- First edition cover.
- Author: Anita Desai
- Language: English
- Publication date: 2004
- ISBN: 978-0-618-04215-9

The Zigzag Way is a 2004 novel by Anita Desai. The novel is about an American academic and writer who goes with his girlfriend to Mexico and rediscovers his passion for fiction writing.

== Summary ==
Eric is a postgraduate student. He and his girlfriend Emily who he calls Em lives in a cozy apartment in Boston. Emily is a scientist. Eric is working on a dissertation on immigration patterns in the US. But Eric is not fulfilled by his research. While he was struggling, striving with no interest, to finish a thesis his professors had told him to, Emily goes on a field trip to Mexico with her fellow doctors and scientists to do research. Bored, out of lost inspiration to continue the thesis, and out of the need for fresh inspiration to write on something else, he, too, decides to join her in Mexico City. On arriving in Mexico Eric is told that he cannot live with her in the research site so as not to disturb Emily in her work. Having nowhere to live, Eric decides to explore and travel around Mexico to develop his fiction writing skills.

Eric attends a lecture by the famous academic Dona Vera who, in her speech, mentions some mining towns that vaguely strike a memory in Eric: his grandfather had only once mentioned those names and he had not forgotten them. Eric decides to visit the Sierras to try to connect with Doña Vera, in the hopes of learning more about his grandfather.

Soon Eric is off on his own, traveling to the Sierra in hopes of learning more about his Cornish grandmother, who followed her future husband to Mexico and died in childbirth during the first days of the revolution. He takes shelter at a mountain estate where Doña Vera, the lecturer whose words inspired him, has turned into a center for studying Huichol culture. During this time, the plot breaks away from Eric to explore Doña Vera’s roots. A teenager who grew up in a troubled and poor family, like many in Mexico, she first made a living by becoming a sex worker. Her story is punctuated with many setbacks, but she eventually became wealthy and respected due to her will and perseverance. Her story is a path of many twists and turns in which each new step was rarely visible ahead of her.

The plot turns to Eric’s grandfather, telling the story of his perilous voyage to Mexico and the many Cornish immigrants who died, were killed, or were deported after all their hard work. At the end of the novel, back in the present-day Sierra Madres, Eric attends a local festival called “La Noche de Los Muertos,” or “The Night of the Dead.” During the ceremony, he meets a spirit from the past, who shows him a glimpse into his own future. Though the tortuous paths of its characters often seem impossible to understand, The Zigzag Way suggests they can be better navigated by referring to the past and seeking to understand one’s ancestors.

== Reception ==
The novel was received with mixed reviews. Liz Hoggard of The Guardian emphasized how the characters often get overwhelmed by the descriptions of the scenery losing the patience of the reader. Similarly, The Scotsman emphasized how the novel often is distant from the reader, often providing more information than the reader needs and not engaging with the characters. Writing for The New York Times, Jennifer Schuessler says, “It's all potentially corny stuff, but Desai pulls it together with economy and grace. And yet, despite this, the novel has the feel of being worked up from a tidbit stumbled upon in an archive or a guidebook, then trained along a trellis of neatly diagrammed meaning rather than allowed to grow wild in a thicket of character and situation.”
