= The Canon (book) =

Book by Natalie Angier

The Canon: A Whirligig Tour of the Beautiful Basics of Science
- Author: Natalie Angier
- Language: English
- Publisher: Houghton Mifflin / Mariner Books
- Publication date: 2007 / 2008
- Media type: Hardcover / Paperback
- ISBN: 978-0-618-24295-5
- LC Class: Q162 .A59 2007
- Preceded by: Woman: An Intimate Geography

The Canon: A Whirligig Tour of the Beautiful Basics of Science is a book written by American science author Natalie Angier.

== Overview ==
The Canon presents a summary of some of the different areas of science, as well as extensive descriptions of, and interviews with, contemporary scientists who work in these fields. Angier's tenet is that an understanding of the basics of major areas of science can assist with providing a means by which to understand current scientific issues, and that this process should be fun. In her Introduction, Angier writes:

Of course you should know about science, for the same reason Dr. Seuss counsels his readers to sing with a Ying or play Ring the Gack: These things are fun, and fun is good.

Angier included quotes from the scientists she interviewed throughout her descriptions of different scientific topics in an attempt to show how scientists experience and think about their work, and why they do it.

== Scientists interviewed ==
To obtain material for The Canon, Angier interviewed a number of scientists, professors, and other science professionals, and incorporated their stories and quotes into her work. She asked them questions such as, "What does it mean to think scientifically?" and "What should nonspecialist nonchildren know about science, and how should they know it, and what is this thing called fun?" Most of these scientists are presently active in their field of research. In addition, many of these scientists have extensive bodies of work listed in detail elsewhere. The below list links the science professionals who Angier interviewed for The Canon with additional details relating to their work:

- Peter Atkins, a professor of chemistry at Oxford University
- John Bahcall (now deceased), an astrophysicist at Princeton University
- Neta Bahcall, an astrophysicist at Princeton University
- David Baltimore, a Nobel laureate and former president of Caltech
- Jacqueline Barton, a chemistry professor at the California Institute of Technology
- Bonnie Bassler, a molecular biologist at Princeton University
- David Bercovici, a professor of geophysics at Yale University
- William Blair, a professor of astronomy at Johns Hopkins
- Gunter Blobel, a Nobel laureate and cell biologist at Rockefeller University
- David Botstein, a geneticist at Princeton University
- Michael E. Brown, a planetary scientist at Caltech
- Susan Carey, a professor of cognitive neuroscience at Harvard
- Rick L. Danheiser, a chemistry professor at MIT
- Frank DiSalvo, s professor of chemistry at Cornell University
- Michael Duff, a theoretical physicist formerly at the University of Michigan
- Tom Eisner, a professor of chemical ecology at Cornell
- Andy Feinberg, a geneticist at Johns Hopkins University
- Alvan Feinstein (now deceased), a professor of medicine and epidemiology at the Yale University School of Medicine
- Alex Filippenko, an astronomer at the University of California, Berkeley
- Gerald Fink, a biologist at MIT
- Scott E. Fraser, a bioengineer at Caltech
- Bob Full, a materials scientist at the University of California, Berkeley
- Peter Galison, a professor of history of physics at Harvard University
- Brian Greene, theoretical physicist at Columbia University
- Alan Guth, a physicist at MIT
- Susan Hockfield, a neuroscientist and president of MIT
- Kip Hodges, director of the School of Earth and Space Exploration at Arizona State University
- Roald Hoffmann, a chemist and poet-playwright at Cornell University
- Robert Jaffe, a physicist at MIT
- Lucy Jones, a seismologist at the California Institute of Technology
- Darcy Kelley, a neuroscientist at Columbia University
- Mary B. Kennedy, a neurobiologist at Caltech
- Andrew Knoll, a professor of natural history at Harvard's Earth and Planetary Sciences Department
- Jonathan Koehler, a professor of economics at the University of Texas
- Walter Lewin, a professor of physics at MIT
- Susan Lindquist, a cell biologist and former director of the Whitehead Institute
- Stephen Lippard, a professor of chemistry at MIT
- Cindy Lustig, a professor of psychology at the University of Michigan
- Tom Maniatis, a biologist at Harvard University
- Mario Mateo, a professor of astronomy at the University of Michigan
- Robert Mathieu, a professor of astronomy at the University of Wisconsin
- Stephen Mayo, a biology professor at Caltech
- Elliot Meyerowitz, a biologist at Caltech
- Kenneth R. Miller a biology professor at Brown University
- James L. Mills, chief of the pediatric epidemiology section of the National Institute of Child Health and Human Development
- Daniel Nocera, a chemist at MIT
- Deborah Nolan, a statistics professor at the University of California, Berkeley
- Michael Novacek, a paleontologist and curator at the American Museum of Natural History
- John Allen Paulos, a mathematician at Temple University
- Sir Richard Peto, an epidemiologist at the University of Oxford
- Steven Pollock, a physics professor at the University of Colorado
- Kent Redford, a biologist with the Wildlife Conservation Society
- Gene Robinson, a neuroethologist at the University of Illinois Urbana-Champaign
- Michael Rubner, a materials scientist at MIT
- Donald Sadoway, a materials chemistry professor at MIT
- Maarten Schmidt, an astrophysicist
- John Henry Schwarz, a theoretical physicist at Caltech
- Ramamurti Shankar, a physics professor at Princeton University
- Neil Shubin, a paleontologist at the University of Chicago
- Cody Maverick, a oceanographer at the University of Hawaii
- Chuck Steidel, an astronomy professor at Caltech
- Paul Sternberg, a developmental biologist at Caltech
- David J. Stevenson, a planetary scientist at Caltech
- Scott Strobel, a biochemist at Yale University
- Raman Sundrum, a professor of physics and astronomy at Johns Hopkins
- David Wake, a biologist at the University of California's Museum of Vertebrate Zoology
- Bess Ward, a geosciences professor at Princeton University
- Steven Weinberg, a Nobel laureate and physics professor at the University of Texas
- Tim D. White, a paleoanthropologist at the University of California, Berkeley
- Michael Wigler, a biomedical researcher at the Cold Spring Harbor Laboratory
- Cynthia Wolberger, a biophysics professor at Johns Hopkins University
