= Journey to Ithaca =

1995 novel by Anita Desai

- Author: Anita Desai
- Language: English
- Genre: Novel
- Publisher: Alfred A. Knopf
- Publication date: 1995
- Publication place: United States
- Media type: Print (hardback & paperback)
- Pages: 312 pp (first edition, hardback)
- ISBN: 978-0-679-43900-4 (first edition, hardback)

Journey to Ithaca is a novel written by Anita Desai, published in 1995. The novel takes its name from a poem by Constantine P. Cavafy. The novel describes a pilgrimage to India by a young couple, Italian Matteo and German Sophie, and the life of a mysterious woman, Laila who runs the ashram where they live and is known there as "The Mother". The novel further develops a theme that Desai explored in an early short story, Scholar and Gypsy; the difference between the character who feels the world is all we need and the character for whom the world is limited.

== Settings ==
The book's story takes place in many different places on 4 continents including Lago di Garda, Northern India, Bombay, Cairo, Paris, New York, and Holyoke MA. Although the exact time frame of the main story is deliberately unclear, it seems to start in the 1960s and take us into the 1970s. Chapter 3 takes place in the 1920s as we follow Laila (later known as the Mother) from her roots in Cairo on her travels to Europe and America. At the time of the framework story, Matteo is seriously ill in the hospital in India and each section before chapter 4 starts with Sophie visiting Matteo.

== Summary ==
=== Prologue ===
The story of Matteo and Sophie's children staying with their grandparents at Lago di Garda interweaves with the story of Matteo and his sister growing up there and eventually Matteo and Sophie's first meeting there at a dinner when she visits with her parents, her father, a German banker who works Matteo's industrialist father. Matteo is deeply under the influence of his German tutor Fabian who introduced him to Hermann Hesse and he is longing to travel east on a spiritual quest. In the present, their children Giacomo and Isabel seem lost in the overbearing environment of the grandparents and can't understand why India where they were both born is a bad place for them.

=== Chapter One ===
Sophie and Matteo's initial time in India goes awry when Matteo and their new friends start visiting questionable spiritual teachers and Sophie feels almost immediately alienated from that quest. Some spiritual teacher in Bombay leads them on a horrific pilgrimage where they witness the death of a child which turns her off for good. They enter a dismal ashram in Haridwar where Sophie hates the routine and the miserable lifestyle while Matteo takes it all as punishment. The Indians despise the polluted foreigners. Their cultural arrogance and rejection is a complete disillusionment for Sophie but Matteo absorbs and embodies some of their despicable behavior. Once she gets pregnant she is ostracized by the already hostile community and they leave for another ashram – to Sophie's dismay – led by the Mother, which accepts families.

=== Chapter Two ===
As they arrive at the place in the foothills of the Himalayas where the ashram is located, Sophie falls violently ill and is taken to hospital while Matteo enters the ashram alone. Under the care of the refreshingly European Dr Bishop Sophie recovers to bear out her pregnancy but when the baby comes she moves into the family quarters with newborn Giacomo. She lives isolated from the community while Matteo becomes increasingly involved, eventually working for the Mother, a mysterious older woman who runs the ashram since the Guru's passing, as her secretary and works with her on publishing the Master's writing. Having a second child does not make things any better and the children end up with their grandparents, first in Germany and then in Italy as Sophie sets out on her quest to find out about the true story of the Mother that has taken control of her husband's life.

=== Chapter Three ===
Matteo is still sick in the hospital as Sophie tells him she will set off on her quest to learn about the life of the Mother. It starts in Cairo just after World War I where Laila was born as the unruly child of French Egyptian academics. Eventually, her parents sent her off to Paris to live with her aunt in a stuffy bourgeois apartment. She finds solace in the oriental shop of Madame Lacan where she reads and learns about India which has an inexplicable attraction for her. When she finds out there will be a dance troupe visiting to perform Krishna Laila, she identifies with Laila and convinces the troupe's leader Krishna to take her on and train her. The troupe takes her to New York where they live in the uptown apartment of a rich benefactress. But the routine of the shows and the poverty wear her down and she suffers from terrible headaches. One night in Holyoke MA she sneaks away before the performance, and travels back to New York but before she can find a job Krishna catches up with her and accepts an offer of free tickets to India to take her home. This entire life journey is traced by Sophie visiting all these places eventually ending alone on the platform of the railway station in Holyoke with no trace of the world Laila knew 45 years ago in sight.

=== Chapter Four ===
Returning to Bombay Sophie has an address where the old Krishna lived and goes there to find out what happened to Laila once she got to India. She receives a package of writing by Laila which tells the story of Laila's quest in India and how she came to run the ashram in a gushing stream of narratives and poems that take up most of chapter Four.

=== Epilogue ===
When Sophie returns to the city where the ashram is Matteo is no longer in the hospital. She goes to the ashram to find out the Mother has died and after intense mourning, Matteo has decided to travel up north to a place to find enlightenment. In her conversation with Diya, her only friend at the ashram, Sophie admits that she will probably follow him to go look for him. Back to the Garden in Italy, Giacomo returns to the house to tell Nonno and Nonna that he saw his father, Matteo out there. They quickly dismiss him, wanting him to move on with his life, the less said about his parents the better. Only his sister Isabel believes him and shares his secret inner world.

=== Notes on the Journey ===
The spiritual quest so famously described in Kavafy's poem, quoted here at the beginning of the book, applies to all three of the main characters but, even if the quest is about the journey rather than about reaching the goal of the journey, they all have a miserable time of it.

One of the key scenes is when Sophie sees the Mother in her garden sitting by herself and observes how the peacocks come to pay tribute to her, a scene that is echoed later when we find out that Laila was famous for her peacock dance during her time as a dancer. But Sophie is not open to seeing the charismatic power of the older woman and only sees her, sitting alone and vulnerable without her turban, as an inexplicable source of power over Matteo. Matteo is so blinded by his thirst for knowledge and enlightenment to reach the goal that he will do anything and sacrifice anything to get there. Sophie's quest is for love, choosing her love for her husband over the care of her children. Her quest is also in her attempt to understand the woman who had the power to take him away from her, but in the end, she tells Diya, she found “nothing much”. Laila's quest is maybe the most passionate of all but it is not clear if her enlightenment brings her true samadhi or just the satisfaction of running a perfectly managed, beautifully kept resort for the spiritually curious. Is it the power that enlightens her or the enlightenment that empowers her? Is her drawing Matteo closer to her a display of that power or an act of grace?

There is some suggestion in the Prologue of sexual tension between Matteo and his tutor Fabian. There is also a very odd scene where the children sleep in the same bed and Isabel places Giacomo's hand between her legs. None of this is developed or otherwise relevant – we are also never quite clear if Laila sleeps with Krishna but one presumes so. Relations between Sophie and Matteo are only described as rather primal and at times aggressive. The sexual repression (or lack of sexuality) adds a dark undercurrent to this rather sinister tale which takes a dim view of the search for enlightenment.

== Reception ==
The novel was well received. For India Today Madhu Jain wrote “ Desai takes the reader further than Jhabvala: her novel is essentially an exploration of sacred and profane love. And in her own, quietly intense way, her prose more in control than ever before, she takes us on a memorable journey.”
