= Shahrukh Husain =

Pakistani writer (born 1950)

Shahrukh Husain (Urdu: شاہ رخ حسین), born 28 April 1950, is a Pakistani author who specializes in fiction, non-fiction, and screenwriting. She is also a psychotherapist, folklorist, and storyteller. She resides in London. She is a Fellow of the Royal Literary Fund.

== Select filmography ==
- Screenplay for In Custody (1993), adapted from the 1984 novel of the same name by Anita Desai. It is a Merchant Ivory Productions film directed by Ismail Merchant. She also wrote an episode for television drama series Beecham House.

== Select books ==
- A Restless Wind (2013)
- The Goddess: Power, Sexuality, and the Feminine Divine (2003)
- Daughters of the Moon: Witch Tales from Around the World (1993)
- Handsome Heroines (1996).
