= Companion of Literature =

Literary award of the Royal Society of Literature

The title Companion of Literature is the highest award bestowed by the Royal Society of Literature. The title was inaugurated in 1961, and is held by up to twelve living writers at any one time.

== Recipients ==
Those who have been awarded the honour are listed below, by the year in which it was granted; those still living are indicated in bold. In 2020, six authors were announced as recipients of the title "Companion of Literature", the first honorees since 2012.

=== 1961 ===
- Winston Churchill (30 November 1874 – 24 January 1965)
- E. M. Forster (1 January 1879 – 7 June 1970)
- John Masefield (1 June 1878 – 12 May 1967)
- W. Somerset Maugham (25 January 1874 – 16 December 1965)
- G. M. Trevelyan (16 February 1876 – 21 July 1962)

=== 1962 ===
- Edmund Blunden (1 November 1896 – 20 January 1974)
- Aldous Huxley (26 July 1894 – 22 November 1963)

=== 1963 ===
- Edith Sitwell (7 September 1887 – 9 December 1964)
- Evelyn Waugh (28 October 1903 – 10 April 1966)

=== 1964 ===
- Elizabeth Bowen (7 June 1899 – 22 February 1973)
- Cecil Day-Lewis (27 April 1904 – 22 May 1972)

=== 1967 ===
- Osbert Sitwell (6 December 1892 – 4 May 1969)

=== 1968 ===
- John Betjeman (28 August 1906 – 19 May 1984)
- Ivy Compton-Burnett (5 June 1884 – 27 August 1969)
- Compton Mackenzie (17 January 1883 – 30 November 1972)
- Rebecca West (21 December 1892 – 15 March 1983)

=== 1972 ===
- Lord David Cecil (9 April 1902 – 1 January 1986)
- Cyril Connolly (10 September 1903 – 26 November 1974)
- L. P. Hartley (30 December 1895 – 13 December 1972)
- Angus Wilson (11 August 1913 – 31 May 1991)

=== 1974 ===
- Ruth Pitter (7 November 1897 – 29 February 1992)
- Kenneth Clark (13 July 1903 – 21 May 1983)
- Arthur Koestler (5 September 1905 – 1 March 1983)

=== 1978 ===
- Philip Larkin (9 August 1922 – 2 December 1985)
- David Garnett (9 March 1892 – 17 February 1981)
- Stephen Spender (28 February 1909 – 16 July 1995)

=== 1983 ===
- Samuel Beckett (13 April 1906 – 22 December 1989)
- William Golding (19 September 1911 – 19 June 1993)
- Graham Greene (2 October 1904 – 3 April 1991)

=== 1987 ===
- Rosamund Lehmann (3 February 1901 – 12 March 1990)
- Iris Murdoch (15 July 1919 – 8 February 1999)
- V. S. Pritchett (16 December 1900 – 20 March 1997)
- Steven Runciman (7 July 1903 – 1 November 2000)

=== 1991 ===
- Anthony Burgess (25 February 1917 – 22 November 1993)
- Seamus Heaney (13 April 1939 – 30 August 2013)
- Patrick Leigh Fermor (11 February 1915 – 10 June 2011)
- Muriel Spark (1 February 1918 – 13 April 2006)

=== 1994 ===
- Sybille Bedford (16 March 1911 – 17 February 2006)
- V. S. Naipaul (17 August 1932 – 11 August 2018)
- William Trevor (24 May 1928 – 20 November 2016)

=== 1998 ===
- D. J. Enright (11 March 1920 – 31 December 2002)
- Harold Pinter (10 October 1930 – 24 December 2008)

=== 2001 ===
- Charles Causley (24 August 1917 – 4 November 2003)
- Doris Lessing (22 October 1919 – 17 November 2013)

=== 2004 ===
- **Michael Holroyd** (27 August 1935 – )
- Tom Stoppard (3 July 1937 – 29 November 2025)

=== 2007 ===
- **Michael Frayn** (8 September 1933 – )
- Peter Porter (16 February 1929 – 23 April 2010)

=== 2012 ===
- Brian Friel (c. 9 January 1929 – 2 October 2015)
- **Margaret Atwood** (18 November 1939 – )
- Alice Munro (10 July 1931 – 13 May 2024)

=== 2020 ===
- **Anita Desai** (24 June 1937 – )
- **Kazuo Ishiguro** (8 November 1954 – )
- Hilary Mantel (6 July 1952 – 22 September 2022)
- Edna O’Brien (15 December 1930 – 27 July 2024)
- **Philip Pullman** (19 October 1946 – )
- **Colin Thubron** (14 June 1939 – )
