= The Worst Hard Time =

2006 book by Timothy Egan

- Author: Timothy Egan
- Language: English
- Subject: Dust Bowl
- Genre: Non-fiction
- Publisher: Houghton Mifflin Harcourt (hardcover); Mariner Books (paperback)
- Publication date: 2007
- Publication place: United States
- Media type: Print (hardcover, paperback), Audiobook, MP3 CD
- Pages: 352 pp (first edition)
- ISBN: 978-0-618-34697-4
- Dewey Decimal: 978/.032

The Worst Hard Time: The Untold Story of Those Who Survived the Great American Dust Bowl is an American history book written by New York Times journalist Timothy Egan and published by Houghton Mifflin in 2006. It tells the problems of people who lived through The Great Depression's Dust Bowl, as a disaster tale.

Egan and The Worst Hard Time won the 2006 National Book Award for Nonfiction and the 2006 Washington State Book Award in History/Biography.

Egan attributes the Dust Bowl tragedy to reckless agricultural misuse of the land, and tells "vivid" and "poignant" stories about individual farmers and their families.

== Bibliographic information ==
Egan, Timothy (2006). The Worst Hard Time: The Untold Story of Those Who Survived the Great American Dust Bowl. Houghton Mifflin Harcourt. ISBN 978-0-618-77347-3.
