= David Wise (journalist) =

American writer and journalist (1930–2018)

External videos
- Booknotes interview with Wise on Cassidy's Run, May 7, 2000, C-SPAN

David Wise (May 10, 1930 – October 8, 2018) was an American journalist and author who worked for the New York Herald-Tribune in the 1950s and 1960s, and published a series of non-fiction books on espionage and US politics as well as several spy novels. His book The Politics of Lying: Government Deception, Secrecy, and Power (1973) won the George Polk Award (Book category, 1973), and the George Orwell Award (1975).

== Early life ==
Wise was born in Manhattan, New York City, New York.

== Education ==
In 1951, Wise graduated from Columbia University, where he was editor-in-chief of the Columbia Daily Spectator.

== Career ==
In 1951, Wise joined the New York Herald-Tribune and became the paper's White House correspondent in 1960. He was chief of the paper's Washington, D.C. bureau from 1963 to 1966. In 1970–71 he was a Fellow of the Woodrow Wilson International Center for Scholars, and in 1977–79, he lectured in political science at the University of California, Santa Barbara. He was later a commentator on intelligence issues for CNN for six years.

=== The Invisible Government ===
Beginning in 1962 with an examination of the Lockheed U-2, Wise published a series of non-fiction books, the first three with Thomas B. Ross. Their book The Invisible Government (1964), exposed the role of the Central Intelligence Agency (CIA) in foreign policy. This included the Bay of Pigs Invasion, as well as CIA-sponsored coup d'états in Guatemala (Operation PBSuccess) and Iran (Operation Ajax). It also exposed the CIA's attempts to overthrow President Sukarno in Indonesia, along with covert operations that were taking place in Laos and Vietnam. The Invisible Government also revealed the name and existence of the National Security Council's covert operations sub-committee, known as the 303 Group, which led to its renaming to the 40 Committee.

Wise and Ross charged that the CIA considered buying up the entire printing of The Invisible Government, but that the plan was rejected when the book's publisher, Random House, pointed out that if that happened they would have to print a second edition. A confidential CIA review of The Invisible Government, which was declassified in 1995, declared that:

"In Great Britain, which is second to none in its devotion to liberty, there exists an Official Secrets Act under which the authors would have been tried and sentenced to prison. … That much of this material has been printed before does not reduce the value to the Soviets of having it gathered in one volume under such genuine American auspices."

=== Later work ===
Wise's book The Politics of Lying: Government Deception, Secrecy, and Power (1973) won the George Polk Award (Book category, 1973), and the George Orwell Award (1975). Later works include Cassidy's Run: The Secret Spy War Over Nerve Gas (2000) on Operation Shocker, and Spy: The Inside Story of How the FBI's Robert Hanssen Betrayed America, (2002), on Robert Hanssen.

Wise also published several novels, including Spectrum (1981), based on the 1965 The Apollo Affair.

== Personal life ==
On October 8, 2018, Wise died from pancreatic cancer in Washington, D.C. He was 88 years old.

== Works ==
=== Articles ===
- "Is Anybody Watching the CIA?" Inquiry (Nov. 27, 1978), pp. 17-21.

=== Books ===
- The U-2 Affair, with Thomas B. Ross. Random House (1962).
- The Invisible Government, with Thomas B. Ross. Random House (1964).
- The Espionage Establishment, with Thomas B. Ross. Random House (1967).
- The Politics of Lying: Government Deception, Secrecy, and Power. Random House (1973).
- The American Police State: The Government Against the People. Random House (1976).
- Spectrum. Viking Press (1981). novel.
- The Children's Game. Doubleday (1983). novel.
- The Samarkand Dimension. St. Martin's/Marek (1987). novel.
- The Spy Who Got Away. Random House (1988).
- Molehunt: The Secret Search for Traitors that Shattered the CIA. Random House (1992).
- Nightmover: How Aldrich Ames Sold The CIA To The KGB For $4.6m. (1995).
- Cassidy's Run: The Secret Spy War Over Nerve Gas. Random House (2000).
- Spy: The Inside Story of How the FBI's Robert Hanssen Betrayed America. Random House (2002).
- Democracy Under Pressure: An Introduction to the American Political System, with Milton C. Cummings, Jr. (2004).
- Tiger Trap: America's Secret Spy War with China. Houghton Mifflin Harcourt (2011).

== Awards ==
- 1973 George Polk Award (Book category), for The Politics of Lying
- 1975 Orwell Award, for The Politics of Lying
