= Anita Desai =

Indian novelist (born 1937)

Anita Desai FRSL
- Born: Anita Mazumdar; 1937 (age 88–89); Mussoorie, Princely State of Tehri Garhwal, British India (present-day Uttarakhand, India)
- Education: University of Delhi
- Occupations: Writer, professor
- Spouse: Ashvin Desai
- Children: 4, including Kiran Desai
- Writing career
- Period: 1963–present
- Genre: Fiction
- Notable works: In Custody; Baumgartner's Bombay

Anita Desai FRSL (born Anita Mazumdar; 1937) is an Indian novelist and the emerita John E. Burchard Professor of Humanities at the Massachusetts Institute of Technology. She has been shortlisted for the Booker Prize three times. She received the Sahitya Akademi Award in 1978 for her novel Fire on the Mountain, from the Sahitya Akademi, India's National Academy of Literature. She won the Guardian Prize for The Village by the Sea (1983). Her other works include Cry, the Peacock, Voices in the City (1963), Fire on the Mountain (1977) and an anthology of short stories, Games at Twilight (1978). She is on the advisory board of the Lalit Kala Akademi and a Fellow of the Royal Society of Literature, London. Since 2020 she has been a Companion of Literature.

== Early life ==
Desai was born in 1937 in Mussoorie, India, to a German immigrant mother, Toni Nime, and a Bengali businessman, D. N. Mazumdar. Her father met her mother while he was an engineering student in pre-war Berlin. They married during a period when it was still unusual for an Indian man to marry a European woman. Shortly after their marriage, they moved to New Delhi, where Desai was raised with her two older sisters and brother.

She grew up speaking Hindi with her neighbours, and German only at home. She also spoke Bengali, Urdu and English. She first learned to read and write in English at school at the age of seven. As a result, English became her "literary language". She published her first story at the age of nine.

She attended Queen Mary's Higher Secondary School in Delhi and received her B.A. in English literature in 1957 from the Miranda House at the University of Delhi. The following year she married Ashvin Desai, later the director of a computer software company and author of the book Between Eternities: Ideas on Life and The Cosmos.

They had four children, including Booker Prize-winning novelist Kiran Desai. Her children were taken to Thul (near Alibagh) for weekends, where Desai set her novel The Village by the Sea. For that work she won the 1983 Guardian Children's Fiction Prize, a once-in-a-lifetime book award judged by a panel of British children's writers.

== Career ==
Desai published her first novel, Cry, the Peacock, in 1963. In 1958 she collaborated with P. Lal and founded the publishing firm Writers Workshop. She considers Clear Light of Day (1980) her most autobiographical work as it is set during her coming of age and also in the same neighborhood in which she grew up.

In 1984, she published In Custody – about an Urdu poet in his declining days – which was shortlisted for the Booker Prize. In 1993, she became a creative writing teacher at Massachusetts Institute of Technology.

The 1999 Booker Prize finalist novel Fasting, Feasting increased her popularity. Her novel The Zigzag Way, set in 20th-century Mexico, appeared in 2004 and her latest collection of short stories, The Artist of Disappearance, was published in 2011.

== Teaching and academic awards ==
Desai has taught at Mount Holyoke College, Baruch College, and Smith College. She is a Fellow of the Royal Society of Literature, the American Academy of Arts and Letters, and Honorary Fellow of Girton College, Cambridge to which she dedicated Baumgartner's Bombay.

== Film ==
In 1993, a film adaptation of her novel In Custody was made by Merchant Ivory Productions, directed by Ismail Merchant and screenplay by Shahrukh Husain. It won the 1994 President of India Gold Medal for Best Picture and starred Shashi Kapoor, Shabana Azmi and Om Puri.

== Awards ==
- 1978 – Winifred Holtby Memorial Prize – Fire on the Mountain
- 1978 – Sahitya Akademi Award (National Academy of Letters Award) – Fire on the Mountain
- 1980 – Shortlisted, Booker Prize for Fiction – Clear Light of Day
- 1983 – Guardian Children's Fiction Prize – The Village by the Sea: an Indian family story
- 1984 – Shortlisted, Booker Prize for Fiction – In Custody
- 1993 – Neil Gunn Prize
- 1999 – Shortlisted, Booker Prize for Fiction: Fasting, Feasting
- 2000 – Alberto Moravia Prize for Literature (Italy)
- 2003 – Benson Medal of the Royal Society of Literature
- 2007 – Sahitya Akademi Fellowship
- 2014 – Padma Bhushan
- 2020 - Companion of Literature

== Bibliography ==
=== Novels ===
- Cry, The Peacock (1963) Orient Paperbacks ISBN 978-81-222008-5-0
- Voices in the City (1965), Orient Paperbacks, ISBN 978-81-222005-3-9
- Bye-bye Blackbird (1971), Orient Paperbacks, ISBN 978-81-222002-9-4
- Where Shall We Go This Summer? (1975), Orient Paperbacks, ISBN 978-81-222008-8-1
- Fire on the Mountain (1977), Random House India, ISBN 978-81-840005-7-3
- Clear Light of Day (1980), Random House India, ISBN 978-81-840001-5-3
- In Custody (1984)
- Baumgartner's Bombay (1988), Harper Perennial, ISBN 978-0618056804
- Journey to Ithaca (1995), Random House India, ISBN 978-81-840007-7-1
- Fasting, Feasting (1999), Random House India, ISBN 978-81-840005-8-0
- The Zigzag Way (2004), Random House India, ISBN 978-81-840007-6-4
- Rosarita (2024), Picador, ISBN 978-10-350444-3-6

=== Collections of novellas and short stories ===
- Games at Twilight (1978), Vintage Publishing, ISBN 978-00-994285-3-4
- Scholar and Gipsy (1996), Weidenfeld & Nicolson, ISBN 978-18-579976-5-1
- Diamond Dust and Other Stories (2000), Vintage Books
- Collected Stories (2008), Random House India, ISBN 978-8184000566
- The Artist of Disappearance (2011), Mariner Books, ISBN 978-05-478401-2-3
- The Complete Stories (2017), Chatto and Windus Penguin Random House UK, ISBN 978-1784741891

=== Children's books ===
- The Peacock Garden (1974), Mammoth Books, ISBN 978-07-497059-2-3
- Cat on a Houseboat (1976), Orient Longman, ISBN 978-08-612502-8-8
- The Village by the Sea (1982), Penguin India, ISBN 978-01-433354-9-8

== See also ==
- Indian English literature
- List of Indian writers

== Sources ==
- Abrams, M. H. and Stephen Greenblatt. "Anita Desai". The Norton Anthology of English Literature, Vol. 2C, 7th Edition. New York: W.W. Norton, 2000: 2768 – 2785.
- Alter, Stephen and Wimal Dissanayake. "A Devoted Son by Anita Desai". The Penguin Book of Modern Indian Short Stories. New Delhi, Middlesex, New York: Penguin Books, 1991: 92–101.
- Gupta, Indra. India's 50 Most Illustrious Women. (ISBN 81-88086-19-3)
- Selvadurai, Shyam (ed.). "Anita Desai:Winterscape". Story-Wallah: A Celebration of South Asian Fiction. New York: Houghton Mifflin, 2005:69–90.
- Nawale, Arvind M. (ed.). "Anita Desai's Fiction: Themes and Techniques". New Delhi: B. R. Publishing Corporation, 2011.
