= The Village by the Sea =

1982 novel by Anita Desai

- First edition
- Author: Anita Desai
- Language: English
- Genre: Realistic young-adult novel
- Publisher: Heinemann
- Publication date: 1982
- Publication place: United Kingdom
- Media type: Print (hardback and paperback)
- Pages: 156 pp (first edition)
- ISBN: 0-434-93436-4
- OCLC: 20796746
- LC Class: PZ7.D4488 Vi 1982

The Village by the Sea: an Indian family story is a novel for young people by the Indian writer Anita Desai, published in London by Heinemann in 1982. It is based on the poverty, hardships and sorrow faced by a small rural, community in India. Desai won the annual Guardian Children's Fiction Prize, a book award judged by a panel of British children's writers. It has 13 chapters.

Penguin published a US edition in 1984.

== Plot ==
The Village by the Sea is set in a small village called Thul in Western India (14 kilometres from Bombay) and focuses on a family trying to make ends meet. The main protagonists are Lila, the eldest child who is 13 years old, and her 12-year-old brother Hari. They also have two younger sisters, Bela and Kamal. They live with their mother, who has been chronically ill and is bed-ridden. Their father is an alcoholic, which forces Hari and Lila to manage the family.

== Synopsis ==
The book describes how Hari, in the dilapidated conditions of the Sri Krishna Eating House, finds warmth and affection through Mr. Andal Panwallah – owner and watch mender of the Ding-Dong watch shop. Mr. Panwallah instills confidence in Hari and comforts him when he is terribly home sick. He even gives Hari a vivid and inspiring future and teaches him watch-mending. This shows that even in one of the busiest, rickety and ramshackle cities such as Bombay there is still hope, love and affection. He also goes back to Thul with the help of Mr. Panwallah and Jagu insisting to buy the bus ticket. Jagu displays his generosity by giving him some extra money to take and share with his family.

== Reception ==
"Desai's subject matter may be stereotypical, but her treatment and sensitive prose give depth to the story, Every minute detail and image ... assumes meaning and fits into the intricate, multi-layered pattern of the novel."

"The theme of survival and adaptation is the paramount aspect of the thematic concerns in the novel. Also, Desai focuses on several other debatable issues pertaining to the contemporary Indian society through her novel, The Village by the Sea. It is apparent that Desai’s vital thematic appeal, her strong emphasis on the complexities of the human existence and her incredible narrative style seem to have added immensely to the success of the particular novel thus signifying her excellence as one of the best writers of the twentieth century India."

== Adaptation ==
It was adapted into a television series of the same name by the BBC in 1991. There was one notable actor Saeed Jaffrey who played the part of Mr. Penwala the watchmaker. A novice actor named Nishan R. Wijesinghe played the lead role of Hari.
