= The Mission: The CIA in the 21st Century =

2025 non-fiction book by Tim Weiner

- 2025 Mariner Books book jacket
- Author: Tim Weiner
- Audio read by: Stefan Rudnicki
- Subject: History of the following: United States intelligence service, Espionage, the 21st Century, Wars in Afghanistan and Iraq, World politics 21st century
- Published: July 2025
- Publisher: Mariner Books
- Publication place: United States
- Media type: Print, eBook, Audio
- Pages: 454
- ISBN: 978-0-06-327018-3
- OCLC: 1474007984
- Website: Official website

The Mission: The CIA in the 21st Century is a 2025 nonfiction book written for a general audience by Tim Weiner. The book was published by Mariner Books. The book chronicles the history of the CIA mostly during the 21st century, beginning in the 1990s.

== Synopsis ==
At the end of the Cold War, the United States' Central Intelligence Agency was forced to search for a new mission. Therefore, "[t]he CIA played a supporting role in the war on drugs and, after the 9/11 attacks, in the war on terror. Agents hunted for the Al Qaeda leader Osama bin Laden in Afghanistan and tortured high-value prisoners in hopes of gaining information on future attacks."

The Mission is the successor to Weiner's 2007 National Book Award book entitled Legacy of Ashes. One theme that runs through The Mission is the politicization of the Central Intelligence Agency due to increased political pressure, usually from the Executive branch. Such pollicization has been occurring since "[l]ong before the shameful Iran-Contra affair in the 1980s."

The presidency of George W. Bush, during the run-up to the American invasion of Iraq in 2003, is held up as an example. The CIA was pressured to produce evidence of the existence of weapons of mass destruction in Iraq. An example of political retribution was the outing of a CIA operative during President Bush's term of office by persons in his administration. Also described are examples of misuse of intelligence and the CIA organization in other administrations.

Weiner's story of the CIA's last 25 years gives insights into the CIA's work and personnel and describes some stark realities. It shows the difficulties that many intelligence officers experienced during the "war on terror". They faced moral dilemmas such as the use of torture on prisoners, and of drone strikes that caused civilian injuries and deaths. These dilemmas made it difficult to carry out U.S. foreign policy during tumultuous times.

== Reception ==
John Simpson, writing for The Guardian says that "Tim Weiner, whose reporting on the CIA in The New York Times was always essential reading, and whose subsequent books on the US intelligence community have a place on the shelves of anyone interested in international affairs... [and] no one has opened up the CIA to us like Weiner has, and The Mission deserves to win Weiner a second Pulitzer".

Scott Anderson of The New York Times says: "For all his book's breadth and timeliness, Weiner seems to have given scant thought to guiding his readers through the labyrinth. One questionable choice was to tell his tale largely chronologically. This is a common authorial device, of course, but the difficulty here is that amid an unending onslaught of new names and situations, the reader is granted few clues as to who or what will prove important later."

Jeff Rowe of The Associated Press says that "[t]he meeting place of facts, ego, ignorance and politics typically is a messy arena as Tim Weiner illustrates over and over in this powerful account of the Central Intelligence Agency actions since the 9/11 attacks... [and] Weiner leaves no doubt as to who is responsible in every misdeed and operational failure he describes — everyone in this 392-page narrative is identified by name."

Helen Warrell writing for The Financial Times says, "Today, as conflict burns in Ukraine and Gaza, and as the US steps back from its role as global security guarantor, The Mission can be read as a cautionary tale, exposing both the power of intelligence and its limitations."

== See also ==
- Fiasco: The American Military Adventure in Iraq by Thomas E. Ricks
- Obama's Wars by Bob Woodward
