= The Invisible Government =

1964 non-fiction book about the CIA

- Author: David Wise; Thomas B. Ross
- Subject: Central Intelligence Agency
- Publisher: Random House
- Publication date: 1964

The Invisible Government is a 1964 non-fiction book by journalists David Wise and Thomas B. Ross, published by Random House. The book described the operations and activities of the Central Intelligence Agency (CIA) at the time.

Christopher Wright of Columbia University wrote that the book argues "that to a significant extent major policies of the United States in the cold war [sic] are established and implemented with the help of government mechanisms and procedures that are invisible to the public and seem to lack the usual political and budgetary constraints on their activities and personnel."

The New York Times described the book as "a journalistic, dramatic narrative that may move us toward a fundamental reappraisal of where secret operations fit into a democratic nation." Wise stated that when the work was published, ordinary people generally had little knowledge of what the CIA did, and that the book "was the first serious study of the CIA’s activities", something that the CIA disliked. Wright added that "Subsequent admissions and appraisals [...] have further substantiated the reports [...] and reinforced the main thesis".

== Background ==
Prior to the book's publication, the topic of American foreign covert operations was taboo. Frequently the CIA would help in persuading popular media to remove references and change stories so the United States was seen as acting defensively.

While criticism of the CIA's intelligence failures or perceived failures was present in the American press, information about direct CIA involvement in covert operations and coups d'etats was left unreported, even when journalists were aware of the agency's involvement. For example, Kennett Love of The New York Times met with Iranian general Fazlollah Zahedi through CIA contacts, and helped distribute propaganda printed by the CIA, while aware of CIA operatives on the ground.

Although there were rare exceptions, such as Richard and Gladys Harkness's pieces in the Saturday Evening Post in 1954 detailing the CIA's involvement in coups in Iran and Guatemala, these were framed as defensive operations in response to Soviet plots.

Wise and Ross were not the first to write a critical history of the CIA. Others had been published in the years before, such as Andrew Tully's 1962 book, CIA: The Inside Story, which reported in less detail how the agency had gone behind presidents' backs. But even though the Tully book had been produced with help from and interviews with CIA publicity officials, it was deemed too offensive by the agency, which sought to discredit it. However, CIA Director John McCone hesitated to fully act against the book, fearing that a CIA reprisal would draw attention to the book after it fell off the bestseller lists.

Another book about the CIA during this time period, which the agency also acquired a manuscript of, was a history of the failed Bay of Pigs invasion, written by journalist Haynes Johnson after interviewing Cuban exiles who had fought in the invasion and were freed by Castro for food and medical supplies. In spite of its criticism of the agency's handling of the Bay of Pigs disaster, the manuscript still overall supported the CIA's role in U.S. national security.

Books written by former CIA employees have to be approved and censored by the agency itself; Wise and Ross were never CIA employees, so the agency had no power to censor the book. Nevertheless, John A. McCone, then director of the CIA, tried to censor the book. Ronald Steel of Commentary stated that "Random House was reportedly urged to suppress the book". The agency created a plan to buy as many books as possible from bookshops, but the agency did not go forward with this as Bennett Cerf, the president of Random House, informed the CIA that the company would order additional printings if the CIA bought the first printing.

== Content ==
Much of the book focuses on CIA activities in Cuba and Southeast Asia.

== Reception ==
The New York Times concluded that the book "forces attention on a painful and perilous dilemma we have been avoiding too long." The publication stated that "annoying carelessness of detail causes one to hope that their substantive assertions are more accurate."

Wright concluded that the authors "have done a service to scholarship by assembling evidence of the depth of this policy confusion."

Steel argued that the book should state remedies on how to curb the influence of the CIA.

Historian Simon Willmetts would later argue that The Invisible Government was "one of the two or three most important books ever written about the CIA", stating that the book was released at a time that let it help shape attitudes about the agency and US foreign policy while booming a "key text" for students protesters and the nascent anti-war movement; later, he argued, the book helped influence conspiracy theorists as "a foundational text in the evolution of a narrative about US government secrecy that would eventually metastasize into the ‘deep state’ narrative of unaccountable federal bureaucracies run amok", but also, Willmetts states, that was a situation where "[p]ropagandists, politicians and conspiracy theorists exaggerated The Invisible Government’s eponymous thesis for their own purposes."

== See also ==
- Neo-imperialism
- Neo-colonialism
