= Tony Vigorito =

American author

- Occupations: Novelist; essayist; social theorist
- Writing career
- Genre: Fictional prose
- Website: tonyvigorito.com

Tony Vigorito is an American author. His published books include Just a Couple of Days, Nine Kinds of Naked, and Love and Other Pranks.

== Published books ==
- Just a Couple of Days (Mariner Books, 2007) ISBN 0-15-603122-1
- Nine Kinds of Naked (Mariner Books, 2008) ISBN 0-15-603123-X
- Love and Other Pranks (Möbius, 2017) ISBN 9780970141958
