= In Custody (novel) =

1984 novel by Anita Desai

- First hardback edition cover.
- Author: Anita Desai
- Language: English
- Publisher: Heinemann
- Publication date: 8 October 1984
- Publication place: United Kingdom
- Media type: Print (Hardback & Paperback)
- Pages: 208 pp (first edition, hardback)
- ISBN: 0-434-18635-X (first edition, hardback)
- OCLC: 11284150

In Custody (1984) is a novel set in Delhi, India by Indian American writer Anita Desai. It was shortlisted for the Booker Prize in 1984.

== Plot summary ==
Deven earns a living by teaching Hindi language literatures to college students. As his true interest was in Urdu poetry, he jumps at the chance to meet the great Urdu poet, Nur. Under the advice of his friend Murad, an editor of a periodical devoted to Urdu literature, Deven procures a secondhand tape recorder so that he can help transcribe Urdu's early poetry, as well as conduct an interview or even write the memoirs of Nur. However, things do not happen as he expects them to.

Devens' old friend Murad visits Deven unexpectedly with an offer for him to interview a great Urdu poet Nur Sahjahanabadi who lives in Chandni Chowk, Old Delhi for his magazine. Deven is fond of Urdu poetry. He accepts the offer. At first, he thinks that he is getting a chance to sit before a great Urdu poet but after reaching his house he notices the unbearable condition of Nur's house. When he meets Nur, he refuses to give an interview by saying that Urdu is now at its last stage and soon this beautiful language will not exist. But he shows some trust in Deven. But Deven gets annoyed by the condition of Nur's house and drops the idea of interviewing Nur. Murad again convinces him to interview Nur with the help of tape recorder so that it can be further used for audio learning by Urdu scholars. Deven, who is a poor lecturer, asks for money from the college for a tape recorder. He goes to a shop to buy, where the shopkeeper, Jain, offers him a second hand tape recorder. At first Deven refuses to purchase it but later Jain convinces him that it is a machine with good quality and his own nephew Chikua will help them to operate it while recording the interview. Unwillingly, Deven agrees to purchase it. Nur's first wife promises Deven that she can arrange a room for Deven if he gives her some money. Deven arranged the money for the payment to her by the college authority with the help of his colleague-cum-friend Siddiqui. He then goes to Delhi with Chiku for recording, but he fails to record the interview. Now, he not only has no recording but also has to bear the expenses like payment demanded by poet, his wife, nephews of Jain, etc.

== Characters ==
1. Deven Sharma – a Hindi professor in Mirpore in Lala Ram Lal Collège, who is tired of his mundane life. He loves Urdu and is a hero-worshiper to Nur, a famous Urdu poet. He also gets the opportunity to meet Nur. He is very naive and seems to live in a world of his own, full of innocence and childhood dreams which gets him in a vulnerable zone. Too simple thus usually manipulated.
2. Nur Shahjenabadi – a famous Urdu poet who laments the loss of a beautiful language(Urdu), and thereby a culture. He is a man of age and experience. He lives in misery and confusion as both his wives are constantly involved in a rivalry.
3. Murad – a cold and calculating friend of Deven who owns a publishing house in Delhi (editor of Awaaz). He exploits Deven and deceives him throughout the novel. He is a bully and is very selfish but a rich kid (of sorts) which gives him an upper hand against Deven, the son of an impoverished widow .
4. Siddiqui – Deven's fellow lecturer of Urdu, is a figure of the decline of the language and culture for which he stands.
5. Imtiaz – Nur's second wife; she is a jealous and calculating woman who is trying to steal the limelight off Nur. She is hungry for fame and wealth.
6. Sarla – Deven's wife; she seems to be controlling Deven. She has some (smallish) dreams of refrigerators and household help thereby her marital life is not a happy one.

== Film ==
The 1993 film adaptation of the novel by Merchant Ivory Productions In Custody was directed by Ismail Merchant, with a screenplay by Shahrukh Husain. It stars the noted actors Shashi Kapoor, Shabana Azmi, and Om Puri.
