= Just a Couple of Days =

2001 novel by Tony Vigorito

- Author: Tony Vigorito
- Language: English
- Genre: Fiction
- Publisher: Bast Books, Harcourt
- Publication date: 2001
- Publication place: United States
- Media type: Print
- Pages: 346
- ISBN: 0970141947
- OCLC: 48020299
- Dewey Decimal: 813.6
- LC Class: PS3622.I48

Just a Couple of Days is the debut novel by author Tony Vigorito. Initially published by a small press in 2001, it has since achieved significant underground success and won Independent Publisher's Best Visionary Fiction Award. It was re-released by Harcourt / Harvest Books in April 2007, and has since been translated into seven languages. Satirical and philosophical in tone, its tag line is "You are invited to the party at the end of time."

== Explanation of the novel's title ==
The title Just a Couple of Days comes from a piece of graffiti which appeared on both sides of an overpass just outside Athens, Ohio on U.S. Route 33 and remained there for over two years. The open-ended tone of the declaration is related to the plot of the book, and the way the words can mean different things to each person who sees them.

== Plot summary ==
Dr. Flake Fountain is approached by the military to develop an antidote to a virus they have created, which is known as the "Pied Piper" virus, due to its relation to a mirth- and dance-inducing virus which supposedly caused the phenomenon the Pied Piper story was based on (see also St. John's Dance), which leaves its victims alive and unharmed, but destroys the brain's capacity for symbolic reasoning. This leaves victims unable to use language, including speech and writing to communicate. However, before Dr. Fountain can complete his antidote, the virus is released and everyone else on Earth, as far as he knows, is infected with it.

He holes up in the house of his friends Blip (a fellow college professor) and Sophia, two organic hippie types. Since the house is a self-sufficient geodesic dome, he is protected from the virus and has electricity, and it is revealed that the book is his journal, where he is recording everything that has happened and is happening. Each chapter also begins with a selection from the "Book o' Billets-Doux" ("love letters" in French), which he found in the dome and is apparently an extended conversation between Blip and Sophia which they wrote, eventually while succumbing to the virus.

In time Flake discovers that the people "afflicted" with the virus can apparently communicate, and he surmises that they connect on a deeper level without the hindrance of a language and its capacity to obscure the truth. They work together and seem happy, even Edenic. Because of this, once he has finished the book, he exposes himself to the virus, becoming unable to continue it and leaving the reader to wonder exactly what happened to him.

== Characters in Just a Couple of Days ==
Dr. Flake Fountain: The primary protagonist, a somewhat neurotic molecular geneticist. Flake admires his eccentric friend Blip and his happiness with his free-spirited wife Sophia, who Dr. Fountain has a crush on. Though initially seduced by money, Flake is ultimately reluctant to participate in the military project he ends up with and is consequently coerced into it.

Blip and Sophia: The happily married hippie friends of Flake's, and parents of a daughter named Dandelion (Dandy). They were both infected with the Pied Piper virus (Blip to compel Flake to continue his research, Sophia accidentally) and finished writing the Book o' Billets-Doux while losing their capacity for language to the disease. This results in extended passages of impressive wordplay.

General Kiljoy: The sadistic military general who recruits Flake and then forces him to continue his research. His most unfortunate trait is a habit of constantly adjusting his crotch.

Tibor Tynee: President and CEO of the university that employs Flake, and particularly fond of poison ivy.

== Trivia ==
This story takes place in the same fictional universe as Tony Vigorito's second novel, Nine Kinds of Naked. This is evidenced by intersecting scenes involving T-shirts displaying the message "Argue Naked."
