= No Ordinary Assignment =

2023 book by Jane Ferguson

No Ordinary Assignment: A Memoir
- 2023 dust cover
- Author: Jane Ferguson
- Subject: Ferguson, Jane; War Press coverage; Women war correspondents Northern Ireland
- Genre: Biography, memoir
- Set in: Modern combat zones
- Published: July 2023
- Publisher: Mariner Books
- Publication place: United States, United Kingdom
- Media type: Print, Digital, Audio
- Pages: 310+
- ISBN: 9780063272248 0063272245
- OCLC: 1385405906
- Website: HarperCollins

No Ordinary Assignment: A Memoir, written by Jane Ferguson, chronicles her career as a Middle East and South Asia war correspondent spanning thirteen years. The book was published in July 2023 by Mariner Books of New York.

== Synopsis ==
Ferguson has reported from modern battle zones in such places as Afghanistan, Yemen, Somalia, Syria, and Ukraine. Her childhood occurred amidst the Irish Republican Army's insurgency during Troubles of Northern Ireland, in the 20th century's last decades. As she grew up, female television news correspondents became her role models. Hence, these were formative years that led to her career as a network news reporter and war correspondent.

Filled with determination and a willingness to take risks, "...Ferguson became...a foreign correspondent for CNN and, later, Al Jazeera, where she covered major stories including the Arab Spring uprisings, the war in Afghanistan, and the Syrian civil war." When Russia invaded Ukraine in 2022 she also covered that. She is currently a special correspondent for the PBS NewsHour. Moving to New York in 2020, and away from the battle zones, gave her a chance to reflect on her life and career. "...[L]ooking back, she acknowledges, reveals just how much there is to take in."

== See also ==
Related memoirs:

- Lessons From the Edge: A Memoir by Marie Yovanovitch
- A Journey by Tony Blair
- At the Center of the Storm: My Years at the CIA by George Tenet
- Decision Points by George W. Bush
