= Timothy Egan =

American writer (born 1954)

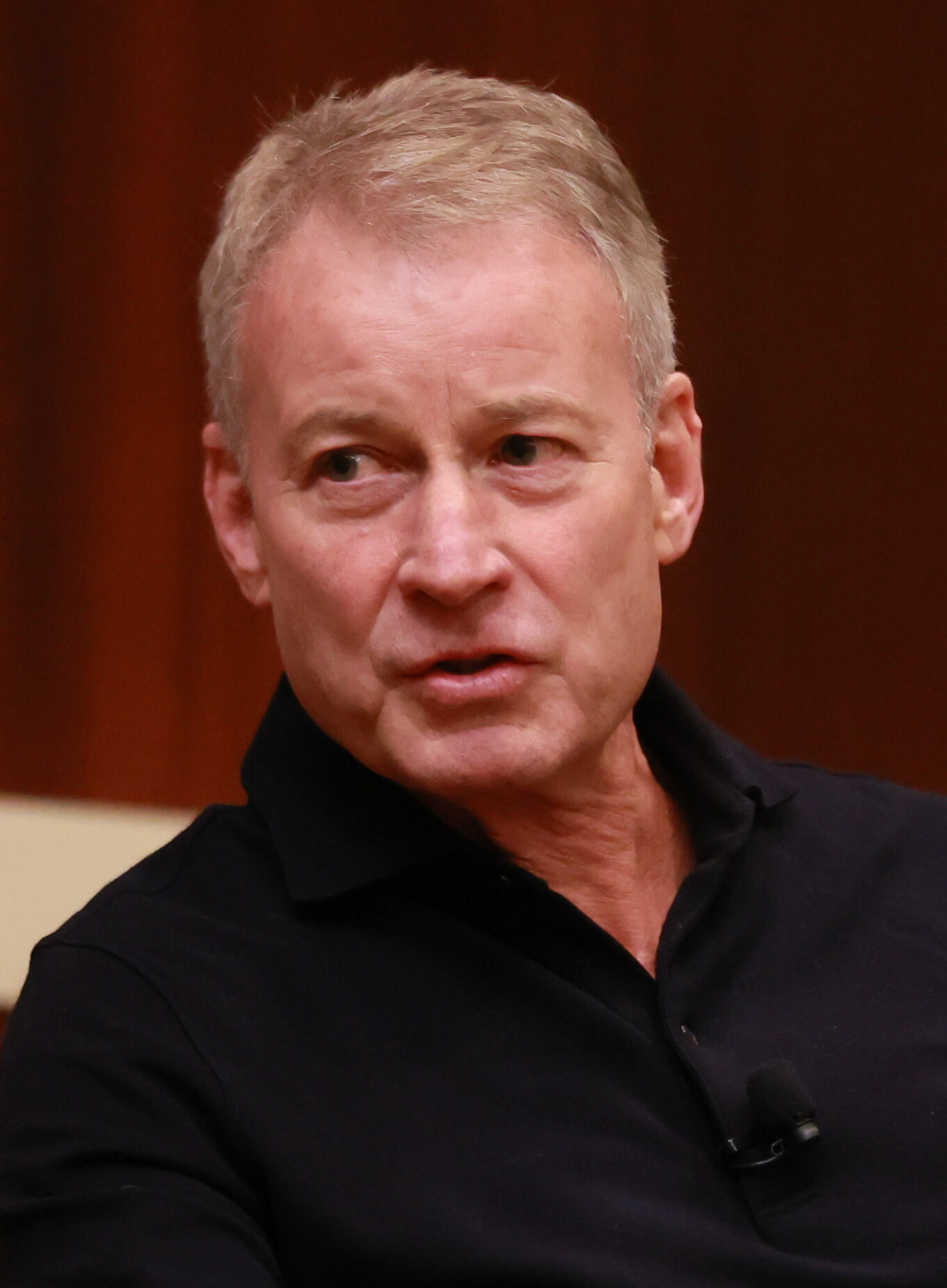
- Egan in 2023
- Born: November 8, 1954 (age 71); Seattle, Washington, U.S.
- Education: University of Washington
- Occupations: Writer, journalist, reporter
- Spouse: Joni Balter
- Children: 2
- Writing career
- Genre: Non-fiction
- Notable work: The Worst Hard Time
- Notable awards: National Book Award, 2006; PNBA Award, 1991, 2010; Washington State Book Award, 2006, 2010
- Website: timothyeganbooks.com

Timothy P. Egan (born November 8, 1954) is an American author, journalist, and former op-ed columnist for The New York Times. Egan has written ten books. Egan, a third-generation Westerner, lives in Seattle.

His first book, The Good Rain, won the Pacific Northwest Booksellers Association Award in 1991. For The Worst Hard Time, a 2006 book about people who lived through the Great Depression's Dust Bowl, he won the National Book Award for Nonfiction and the Washington State Book Award in History/Biography. His book on the photographer Edward Curtis, Short Nights of the Shadow Catcher, won the 2013 Carnegie Medal for Excellence for nonfiction. The Big Burn: Teddy Roosevelt and the Fire that Saved America (2009) is about the Great Fire of 1910, which burned about three million acres (12,000 km^{2}) and helped shape the United States Forest Service. The book describes some of the political issues facing Theodore Roosevelt. For this work he won a second Washington State Book Award in History/Biography and a second Pacific Northwest Booksellers Association Award.

In 2001, The New York Times won a Pulitzer Prize for National Reporting for a series to which Egan contributed, "How Race is Lived in America".

In 2023, he published A Fever in the Heartland, about how the rape and murder of Madge Oberholtzer helped undo the rising KKK tide in the U.S.

== Awards and honors ==
- 1991 Pacific Northwest Booksellers Association Award, The Good Rain
- 2001 Pulitzer Prize for National Reporting, "How Race is Lived in America" (contributor)
- 2006 National Book Award for Nonfiction, The Worst Hard Time
- 2006 Washington State Book Award in History/Biography, The Worst Hard Time
- 2010 Washington State Book Award in History/Biography, The Big Burn: Teddy Roosevelt and the Fire that Saved America
- 2010 Pacific Northwest Booksellers Association Award, The Big Burn: Teddy Roosevelt and the Fire that Saved America
- 2013 Chautauqua Prize, winner, Short Nights of the Shadow Catcher
- 2013 Andrew Carnegie Medal for Excellence in Nonfiction, winner, Short Nights of the Shadow Catcher
- 2024 Notable Book. American Library Association, A Fever in the Heartland: The Ku Klux Klan's Plot to Take Over America, and the Woman Who Stopped Them.

== Writings ==
- Egan, Timothy (1990). The Good Rain. Knopf. ISBN 0-394-57724-8.
- Egan, Timothy (1992). Breaking Blue. Knopf. ISBN 0-394-58819-3.
- Egan, Timothy (1998). Lasso the Wind. Knopf. ISBN 0-375-40024-9.
- Egan, Timothy (2004). The Winemaker's Daughter. Knopf. ISBN 1-4000-4099-X.
- The Worst Hard Time: The Untold Story of Those Who Survived the Great American Dust Bowl. Houghton Mifflin Harcourt. 2006. ISBN 978-0-618-77347-3.
- Egan, Timothy (2009). The Big Burn: Teddy Roosevelt and the Fire that Saved America. Houghton Mifflin Harcourt. ISBN 978-0-618-96841-1.
- Egan, Timothy (2012). Short Nights of the Shadow Catcher: The Epic Life and Immortal Photographs of Edward Curtis. Houghton Mifflin Harcourt. ISBN 978-0-618-96902-9.
- The Immortal Irishman: The Irish Revolutionary Who Became an American Hero. 2016. ISBN 9780544272880
- Egan, Timothy (2019). A Pilgrimage to Eternity: From Canterbury to Rome in Search of a Faith. Penguin. ISBN 978-0735225237.
- Egan, Timothy (2023). A Fever in the Heartland: The Ku Klux Klan's Plot to Take Over America, and the Woman Who Stopped Them. Penguin. ISBN 978-0735225268.
