= Natalie Angier =

American writer

- Born: February 16, 1958 (age 68); New York City, U.S.
- Occupation: Science writer
- Employer: The New York Times
- Known for: Science articles and books
- Notable work: Woman: An Intimate Geography, 1999; The Canon: A Whirligig Tour of the Beautiful Basics of Science, 2007
- Spouse: Rick Weiss
- Children: Katherine Weiss Angier
- Parents: Keith Angier (father); Adele Angier, née Rosenthal (mother)
- Awards: Pulitzer Prize for Beat Reporting, 1991

Natalie Marie Angier (/ænˈdʒɪər/) (born February 16, 1958 in the Bronx, New York City) is an American nonfiction writer and a former science journalist for The New York Times. Her awards include the Pulitzer Prize for Beat Reporting in 1991 and the AAAS Westinghouse Science Journalism Award in 1992. She is also noted for her public identification as an atheist and received the Freedom from Religion Foundation's Emperor Has No Clothes Award in 2003.

== Early life ==
Angier was born in the Bronx, New York City, on February 16, 1958, to Keith Angier and Adele Angier, née Rosenthal. She had three siblings and credits her parents with granting her a deep respect for books from an early age. She was raised in the Bronx and New Buffalo, Michigan.

== Education ==
Angier began her college studies at age 16 at the University of Michigan. After completing two years at the University of Michigan, she studied English, physics, and astronomy at Barnard College, where she graduated magna cum laude in 1978. She also studied medieval literature, post graduation.

== Career ==
Angier began her writing career as a technical writer for Texas Instruments. She was then hired as a founding staff member of Discover Magazine in 1980 and largely wrote about evolutionary biology and animal behavior during her four years there. After Discover, she worked as a senior science writer for Time Magazine; as an editor at the women's magazine, Savvy (now defunct); and as a professor at the New York University's Graduate Program in Science and Environmental Reporting.

In 1990, Angier joined The New York Times as a science writer and remains on staff. She won the Pulitzer Prize for Beat Reporting in 1991 and the AAAS Westinghouse Science Journalism Award in 1992.

Her writing has appeared in print and on-line magazines: The American Scholar, The Atlantic, GEO, National Geographic, O magazine, Parade, Slate, Smithsonian, Washington Monthly, among others. Angier's books and anthology contributions are detailed in the Books section below.

Angier is a voting member of the usage panel of The American Heritage Dictionary.

== Philosophical views ==
Angier first publicly described herself as an atheist in 2001:

So, I'll out myself. I'm an Atheist. I don't believe in God, Gods, Godlets or any sort of higher power beyond the universe itself, which seems quite high and powerful enough to me. I don't believe in life after death, channeled chat rooms with the dead, reincarnation, telekinesis or any miracles but the miracle of life and consciousness, which again strike me as miracles in nearly obscene abundance. I believe that the universe abides by the laws of physics, some of which are known, others of which will surely be discovered, but even if they aren't, that will simply be a result, as my colleague George Johnson put it, of our brains having evolved for life on this one little planet and thus being inevitably limited. I'm convinced that the world as we see it was shaped by the again genuinely miraculous, let's even say transcendent, hand of evolution through natural selection.

— Natalie Angier, "Confessions of a Lonely Atheist", New York Times Sunday Magazine (January 14, 2001)

This, in part, is why Angier was presented with the Freedom from Religion Foundation's Emperor Has No Clothes Award in 2003.

== Personal life ==
Angier married Rick Weiss on July 27, 1991. Rick Weiss is a former science reporter for The Washington Post. Angier and Weiss live in Takoma Park, Maryland and have a daughter, Katherine Weiss Angier, who graduated summa cum laude in 2018 from Princeton with a degree in Biology.

== Awards and honors ==
- Natural Obsessions named AAAS Notable Book of the Year, 1988
- Natural Obsessions named New York Times Notable Book of the Year, 1988
- Pulitzer Prize for Beat Reporting, 1991
- AAAS Science Journalism Award (Large Newspaper), 1992
- New York Times Bestseller (Nonfiction), 1999: Woman: An Intimate Geography
- Freedom from Religion Foundation's Emperor Has No Clothes Award, 2003
- A. D. White Professor-at-Large at Cornell University, six-year appointment, 2006–2012
- Committee for Skeptical Inquiry's Robert P. Balles Prize in Critical Thinking, 2007, for The Canon: A Whirligig Tour of the Beautiful Basics of Science
- New York Times Bestseller (Nonfiction), 2007: The Canon: A Whirligig Tour of the Beautiful Basics of Science
- AAAS/Subaru SB&F Prize for Excellence in Science Books Finalist, 2008, for The Canon: A Whirligig Tour of the Beautiful Basics of Science
- American Library Association's Notable Book for Adults Award, 2008, for The Canon: A Whirligig Tour of the Beautiful Basics of Science
- Keynote speaker for the 2009 Washington & Jefferson College commencement exercises
- Humanist Media Award from the American Humanist Association, 2014
- Barnard College Distinguished Alumna Award
- General Motors International Award for Writing about Cancer
- Lewis Thomas Award for Distinguished Writing in the Life Sciences
- Exploratorium Public Understanding of Science Award
- Voting member of the usage panel of The American Heritage Dictionary

== Books ==
- Author: Natural Obsessions: Striving to Unlock the Deepest Secrets of the Cancer Cell, 1988, ISBN 0395924723 1999 Paperback
- Contributor: New Science Journalists, 1995, ISBN 0345383656 Paperback
- Author: The Beauty of the Beastly: New Views on the Nature of Life, 1995, ISBN 0395791472 1996 Paperback
- Author: Woman: An Intimate Geography, 1999, ISBN 0544228103 2014 Paperback
- Contributor: The Best American Science Writing 2000, 2000, ISBN 0060957360 Paperback
- Contributor: The Best American Science Writing 2001, 2001, ISBN 0060936487 Paperback
- Contributor: The Best American Science Writing 2002, 2002, ISBN 0060936509 Paperback
- Editor: The Best American Science and Nature Writing 2002, 2002, ISBN 0618134786 Paperback
- Contributor: The Bitch in the House: 26 Women Tell the Truth About Sex, Solitude, Work, Motherhood, and Marriage, 2002, ISBN 0060936460 Paperback
- Contributor: When Race Becomes Real: Black and White Writers Confront Their Personal Histories, 2002, ISBN 155652448X Hardcover
- Contributor: Sisterhood Is Forever: The Women's Anthology for a New Millennium, 2003, ISBN 0743466276 Paperback
- Contributor: The Best American Science Writing 2003, 2003, ISBN 0060936517 Paperback
- Contributor: The Best American Science Writing 2005, 2005, ISBN 0060726423 Paperback
- Contributor: The Best American Science Writing 2005, 2005, ISBN 0060726423 Paperback
- Contributor: Axelrod & Cooper's Concise Guide to Writing, 4th Edition, 2006, ISBN 0312434391 Paperback
- Author: The Canon: A Whirligig Tour of the Beautiful Basics of Science, 2007, ISBN 0547053460 Paperback
- Editor: The Best American Science Writing 2009, 2009, ISBN 9780061431661 Paperback
- Author: Woman: An Intimate Geography, Revised and Updated Edition, 2014, ISBN 1844089908 Paperback

== Articles ==
- Author: "Not Milk?" (review of Anne Mendelson, Spoiled: The Myth of Milk as Superfood, Columbia University Press, 2023, 396 pp.), The New York Review of Books, vol. LXX, no. 16 (19 October 2023), pp. 36, 38–39. "[Americans'] consumption of cow's milk [...] peak[ed in] 1945, when [they] drank an average of forty-five gallons apiece. By 2001 the nation's per capita milk intake had been cut in half, to twenty-three gallons, and in 2021 the figure was down to just sixteen gallons of milk per person, or 5.6 ounces a day... Leading the... drop-off are members of Generation Z: people born after 1996... Among the eco-conscious, antipathy toward dairy milk is great enough that some high-end coffee shops feel no obligation to offer it at all." (p. 36.)
