= Fasting, Feasting =

Novel by Anita Desai

- Author: Anita Desai
- Language: English
- Genre: Novel
- Publisher: Chatto & Windus
- Publication date: 1999
- Publication place: United Kingdom
- Media type: Print (hardback & paperback)
- Pages: 228 pp (first edition, hardback)
- ISBN: 0-618-06582-2 (first edition, hardback)
- OCLC: 93036972

Fasting, Feasting is a novel by Indian writer Anita Desai, first published in 1999 in Great Britain by Chatto & Windus. It was shortlisted for the Booker Prize for fiction in 1999.

== Plot summary ==
Anita Desai's novel takes place in two countries, India and the United States. The core characters comprise a family living in a small town in India, where provincial customs and attitudes dictate the future of all children: girls are to be married off and boys are to become as educated as possible. The story focuses on the life of the unmarried main character, Uma, a spinster, the family's older daughter, with Arun, the boy, and baby of the family. Uma spends her life in subservience to her older demanding parents, while massive effort and energy are expended to ensure Arun's education and placement in a university in Massachusetts. The younger daughter Aruna gets married. In part two the reader is introduced to Arun in America.

Rather a series of events from life than a complexly plotted work, the story follows Uma and Arun as they engage with family and strangers and the intricacy of day-to-day living. Ramu-Bhai is a traveling bon viveur who tries to show Uma a good time. He is banished by her parents. Another character is the religious Mira Masi who tells Uma all the tales of Krishna and takes her to the ashram allowing her to escape her mother's domination for a time.

Uma's parents attempt to marry her off on three occasions; on the first occasion, the chosen man fell for Uma's younger sister, Aruna. On the second her parents accept her marriage on behalf of her before finding out later that their dowry has been spent and the engagement is canceled. On the third occasion, a marriage took place but it turns out that Uma's new husband already has a wife. She lives with his sisters while he lives in another town spending her dowry on his ailing business. Uma's father quickly spirits her home and gets her marriage annulled. Her family then gives up on the attempts to marry her off and instead focus on their younger daughter.

The story also includes an episode of Anamika's (Uma's cousin) sad fate. She has won a scholarship to Oxford but her parents insist that she get married. She does and fails to please her husband by providing him with children. He keeps her for a time as a servant but eventually she dies by burning. It is strongly hinted that her in-laws killed her. The final scene of the first part is the immersion of Anamika's ashes in the sacred river.

In Part 2 we meet Arun, Uma's privileged brother. He is attending college in America and during summer holidays he lives with the Pattons, an all-American family. Again, the plot is not complex or intricate. The events are told in a serial manner as Arun encounters them.

Of note is his intense dislike of American food and cooking methods. He is dismayed at the behaviour of Melanie, the daughter who is deeply troubled and suffering from bulimia. Although Mrs Patton seems to care about Melanie, she does little to help.

While apparently close, the family are actually distant from one another, something very different from Arun's experience of family life in India. Arun spends most of his time alone and isolated. Arun tries his best to escape from western society but in vain.

== Reception ==
In an initial review for India Today, Jyoti Arora wrote "A certain starkness of vision, an uncompromising realism and superbly evocative images are immediately striking in the novel."

For Salon, Sylvia Brownrigg wrote, Fasting, Feasting is a novel not of plot but of comparison. In beautifully detailed prose Desai draws the foods and textures of an Indian small town and of an American suburb. In both, she suggests, family life is a complex mixture of generosity and meanness, license and restriction: The novel's subtle revelation is in the unlikely similarities."

== Controversy ==
The day after J. M. Coetzee's novel, Disgrace, was announced as the winner of the 1999 Booker Prize, in an article for The Guardian, John Sutherland, Professor of English at University College, London, leaked hints of divisions and encampments on the panel — so incurring the wrath of the other judges, who wrote furious articles of their own, lambasting him for his indiscretion. The jury was divided and the two female judges, writers Shena Mackay and Natasha Walter, were convinced the Fasting, Feasting should take the prize. Outnumbered on the panel, their opinion was nevertheless strong enough to demand expression, and the Booker Prize judges took the unprecedented step of naming Fasting, Feasting as runner-up.
