= Jane Ferguson =

British/Irish journalist

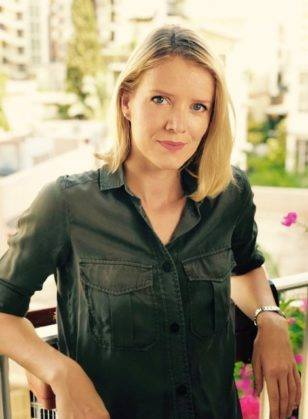
- Ferguson in 2018
- Born: September 15, 1984 (age 41); County Armagh, Northern Ireland
- Education: Royal School Armagh, The Lawrenceville School, University of York,
- Occupation: Journalist
- Years active: 14
- Employer: PBS NewsHour
- Known for: foreign and war reporting
- Notable work: Homs, Syria 2012, Battle for Mosul 2016, war and famine in Yemen in 2018, Fall of Kabul 2021.
- Style: front line, personable, human
- Television: PBS NewsHour
- Title: Special Correspondent
- Spouse: Charley Cooper (m. 2023)
- Awards: 2019 Emmy Award; 2019 George Polk Award; 2019 Alfred I. DuPont Columbia University Award; 2020 Aurora Award for Humanitarian Reporting; 2020 Peabody; 2021 Overseas Press Club of America Peter Jennings Award; 2021 Gracie Award; 2021 Alfred I. DuPont Columbia University Award
- Website: www.journalistjaneferguson.com

Jane Ferguson (born September 15, 1984) is an Irish and British media executive and founder, author and journalist, based in New York City.

Ferguson is the Founder and CEO of Noosphere, a media tech company creating online monetization platforms for journalists and high quality content creators.

Previously, Ferguson was a special correspondent for PBS NewsHour where she covered the Middle East, Africa, and South Asia extensively as a war reporter. Ferguson has also contributed analysis and reports to The New Yorker.

== Early life and education ==
Ferguson was born in County Armagh, Northern Ireland, and was educated at The Royal School, Armagh before attending the Lawrenceville School in New Jersey. She returned to the UK to study English literature and politics at the University of York. She spent 14 years in the Middle East, based at times in Dubai, Kabul and Beirut, before moving to New York in 2020 where she currently lives.

== CNN ==
Ferguson was a contracted freelance foreign correspondent for CNN International from 2009 through 2011, reporting from the Middle East and Africa. Living in the UAE at the time, she reported to the CNN Abu Dhabi bureau. She worked alone, filming, producing, and reporting stories from Yemen, Somalia, and Sudan. In 2009 Ferguson travelled to northern Yemen to report for CNN on Houthi rebel incursions into Saudi territory and resulting Saudi airstrikes inside Yemen. The following year she returned to Yemen to cover the US and British militaries partnerships with Yemeni Government forces in fighting Al-Qaeda in the Arabian Peninsula, the Yemeni franchise of Al Qaeda. In 2010 Ferguson was one of the first foreign reporters to embed with African Union peacekeeping forces in Mogadishu as they battled Al Qaeda-linked Al Shabab militants, returning in 2011 to cover the mostly Ugandan forces' "Battle For Mogadishu" from the front lines. Later that year she travelled to the North-South Sudan border and reported for CNN as fighting broke out and displaced thousands ahead of the country's official division later in 2011.

Ferguson's reporting focused on Al-Qaeda offshoots and franchises across the horn of Africa and Yemen, as well as conflict less covered by US TV outlets and newspapers. She was the first international broadcaster in Somalia when famine was declared in 2011. Ferguson reported from Northern Yemen during the 2009 conflict between the Yemeni government and Houthi rebels.

== Al Jazeera English ==
From 2011 to 2014 Ferguson worked as an international correspondent for Al Jazeera English. Reporting from across the Middle East, she covered major stories including the Arab Spring, the war in Afghanistan, Palestinian-Israeli conflict, and the Syrian civil war.

In late 2011 and throughout 2012 Ferguson reported exclusively from inside Yemen as the country's revolution toppled dictator Ali Abdullah Saleh and the Yemeni military split into two factions. Al Jazeera was banned by the government throughout the revolution and protest movement, so Ferguson did not appear on camera, voicing stories and being referred to by anchors in the Al Jazeera studio as "our correspondent who we are not naming for her own security".

In January 2012 Ferguson was the first correspondent for the network to enter rebel-held Syria. She was smuggled across the border from Lebanon into the Syrian city of Homs, where she filmed, produced, and reported alone from the restive Bar Amr neighborhood.

As the Arab Spring protests and revolutions swept across the Middle East Ferguson reported for the network from Yemen, Jordan, Syria and Egypt. In July 2013 Ferguson was on the streets of Cairo reporting live for Al Jazeera as the Egyptian military opened fire on Muslim brotherhood, anti-coup protestors calling for the reinstatement of Muslim Brotherhood President Mohammed Al Morsi. In 2013 Ferguson was made Afghanistan correspondent and spent a year based in Kabul, reporting extensively from the country. On March 20, 2014, Ferguson was in the Kabul Serena Hotel when it was attacked by Taliban militants who had smuggled guns onto the premises. Ferguson was in her room when the attackers executed diners in the restaurant downstairs, and was able to escape after Afghan security forces arrived and engaged in a gun battle with the Taliban fighters.

== PBS NewsHour ==
In 2015 Ferguson began reporting for the PBS NewsHour as a special correspondent. She covered the battle against ISIS in Iraq in 2016 and 2017, reporting from the front lines throughout the conflict, embedded with Iraqi Army troops, American forces, and Shia militia. Ferguson's reporting won a citation from the Overseas Press Awards of America.

In 2017 Ferguson reported from inside South Sudan on the South Sudanese Civil War and famine gripping the country. Traveling across the country by plane, car and canoe to both government and rebel controlled areas, her series of reports for the NewsHour examined ethnic cleansing at the hands of government soldiers, rape as a weapon of war, and the man-made nature of the country's famine.

=== Yemeni civil war ===
The next year, Ferguson was twice smuggled into rebel-held Yemen where her exclusive reports exposed famine conditions among the population as a result of the war. Her reporting from Yemen won the 2019 George Polk Award, an Emmy, and an Alfred I. duPont–Columbia University Award, and has been nominated for a Peabody Award and shortlisted for a Livingston Award.

In 2020 Ferguson was awarded the Aurora Award for Humanitarian Reporting, along with The New York Times columnist Nicholas Kristof. In 2021 she was nominated for a Peabody Award for her work reporting on the frontlines with Yemeni soldiers.

=== Fall of Kabul ===
Ferguson reported extensively for PBS and The New Yorker in the run up to the Taliban's takeover of Afghanistan and during the group's eventual return to power in Kabul. On August 15, 2021, Ferguson and her cameraman Eric O'Connor were in Kabul as the Taliban seized power and were the only American broadcasters to remain at Kabul airport throughout the entire evacuation crisis.

Ferguson and her team were later awarded the Peter Jennings Award for their reporting from Afghanistan by the Overseas Press Club Award, with the judges commenting: "In years to come, students of history will be able to look back at these PBS NewsHour segments from Afghanistan by Jane Ferguson and team to understand what happened in the final year of America’s longest war. Throughout 2021, as most Americans’ attention had turned away, the team returned again and again to capture the final arc of the story."

== Princeton University ==
In 2020 Ferguson was invited to design and teach a course on war reporting at Princeton University. She was named a Ferris Professor of Journalism for the fall semester of that year, in the Humanities Department's Journalism Program. In 2023 she was asked to return as a guest professor to teach her course.

== No Ordinary Assignment ==
In July 2023 Ferguson published her first book, No Ordinary Assignment. It has been described by The New York Times as "engrossing" and "writing with the kind of intimate knowledge that is prized by novelists and historians." The book was awarded the 2024 Ann M. Sperber Book Prize from Fordham University. It is a national bestseller.

== Noosphere, Inc ==
Ferguson informally incubated Noosphere at Princeton University while a visiting professor of journalism there in Fall 2023. She founded Noosphere in January 2024 and launched the company's first app a year later.

== Bibliography ==
- —— (2023). No Ordinary Assignment: A Memoir. Mariner.
