= List of intelligence gathering disciplines =

This is a list of intelligence gathering disciplines.

== HUMINT ==
Human intelligence (HUMINT) are gathered from a person in the location in question. Sources can include the following:

- Advisors or foreign internal defense (FID) personnel working with host nation (HN) forces or populations
- Diplomatic reporting by accredited diplomats (e.g. military attachés)
- Espionage clandestine reporting, access agents, couriers, cutouts
- Military attachés
- Non-governmental organizations (NGOs)
- Prisoners of war (POWs) or detainees
- Refugees
- Routine patrolling (military police, patrols, etc.)
- Traveler debriefing (e.g. CIA Domestic Contact Service)

MI6 is often thought to use human intelligence to operate in different countries or Britain itself to protect the country from global affairs. However, this is usually confused with their brother agency MI5, which focuses on the security of Britain.

== FININT ==
Financial intelligence (FININT) are gathered from analysis of monetary transactions.

== GEOINT ==
Geospatial intelligence (GEOINT) are gathered from satellite and aerial photography, or mapping/terrain data.

- Imagery intelligence (IMINT) – gathered from satellite and aerial photography

== MASINT ==
Measurement and signature intelligence (MASINT) are gathered from an array of signatures (distinctive characteristics) of fixed or dynamic target sources. According to the Air Force Institute of Technology's Center for MASINT Studies and Research, MASINT is split into six major disciplines: electro-optical, nuclear, radar, geophysical, materials, and radiofrequency.

1. Electro-optical MASINT
  - Airborne electro-optical missile tracking MASINT
  - Tactical counter-artillery sensors
  - Infrared MASINT
  - Optical measurement of nuclear explosions
  - LASER MASINT
  - Spectroscopic MASINT
  - Hyperspectral MASINT
  - Space-based staring infrared sensors
2. Nuclear MASINT
  - Radiation survey and dosimetry
  - Space-based nuclear energy detection
  - Effects of ionizing radiation on materials
3. Geophysical MASINT
  - Weather and sea intelligence MASINT
  - Acoustic MASINT, also known as acoustical intelligence (ACOUSTINT or ACINT)
  - Seismic MASINT
  - Magnetic MASINT
  - Gravitimetric MASINT
4. Radar MASINT
  - Line-of-sight radar MASINT
  - Synthetic aperture radar (SAR) and inverse synthetic aperture radar (ISAR) MASINT
  - Non-cooperative target recognition
  - Multistatic radar MASINT
  - Passive covert radar
5. Materials MASINT
  - Chemical materials MASINT
  - Biological materials MASINT
  - Nuclear test analysis
6. Radiofrequency MASINT
  - Frequency domain MASINT
  - Electromagnetic pulse MASINT
  - Unintentional radiation MASINT

== OSINT ==
Open-source intelligence (OSINT) are gathered from open sources. OSINT can be further segmented by the source type: Internet/General, Scientific/Technical, Social Media, and various HUMINT specialties, e.g. trade shows, association meetings, and interviews.

== SIGINT ==
Signals intelligence (SIGINT) are gathered from interception of signals.

- Communications intelligence (COMINT)
- Electronic intelligence (ELINT) – gathered from electronic signals that do not contain speech or text (which are considered COMINT)
  - Foreign instrumentation signals intelligence (FISINT) – entails the collection and analysis of telemetry data from a missile or sometimes from aircraft tests; formerly known as telemetry intelligence or TELINT

== TECHINT ==
Technical intelligence (TECHINT) are gathered from analysis of weapons and equipment used by the armed forces of foreign nations, or environmental conditions.

- Medical intelligence (MEDINT) – gathered from analysis of medical records and/or actual physiological examinations to determine health and/or particular ailments and allergic conditions for consideration

== See also ==
- All-source intelligence
- Cryptanalysis
- Meteorological intelligence
- Operations security
- Spy satellite
- TEMPEST
- Traffic analysis
