= Electro-optical MASINT =

Subdiscipline of Measurement and Signature Intelligence

Intelligence cycle management
Intelligence collection management
MASINT
- Electro-optical MASINT
- Nuclear MASINT
- Geophysical MASINT
- Radar MASINT
- Materials MASINT
- Radiofrequency MASINT

Electro-optical MASINT is a subdiscipline of Measurement and Signature Intelligence, (MASINT) and refers to intelligence gathering activities which bring together disparate elements that do not fit within the definitions of Signals Intelligence (SIGINT), Imagery Intelligence (IMINT), or Human Intelligence (HUMINT).

Electro-optical MASINT shares some similarities with IMINT, but is distinct from it. IMINT's primary goal is to create a picture, composed of visual elements understandable to a trained user. Electro-optical MASINT helps validate that picture, so that, for example, the analyst can tell if an area of green is vegetation or camouflage paint. Electro-optical MASINT also generates information on phenomena that emit, absorb, or reflect electromagnetic energy in the infrared, visible light, or ultraviolet spectra, phenomena where a "picture" is less important than the amount or type of energy reported. For example, a class of satellites, originally intended to give early warning of rocket launches based on the heat of their exhaust, reports energy wavelengths and strength as a function of location(s). There would be no value, in this specific context, to seeing a photograph of the flames coming out of the rocket.

Subsequently, when the geometry between the rocket exhaust and the sensor permits a clear view of the exhaust, IMINT would give a visual or infrared picture of its shape, while electro-optical MASINT would either give a list of coordinates with characteristics, or a "false-color" image, the temperature distribution, and spectroscopic information on its composition.

In other words, MASINT may give a warning before characteristics visible to IMINT are clear, or it may help validate or understand the pictures taken by IMINT.

MASINT techniques are not limited to the United States, but the U.S. distinguishes MASINT sensors from others more than do other nations. According to the United States Department of Defense, MASINT is technically derived intelligence (excluding traditional imagery IMINT and signals intelligence SIGINT) that – when collected, processed, and analyzed by dedicated MASINT systems – results in intelligence that detects, tracks, identifies, or describes the signatures (distinctive characteristics) of fixed or dynamic target sources. MASINT was recognized as a formal intelligence discipline in 1986. Another way to describe MASINT is "a 'non-literal' discipline". It feeds on a target's unintended emissive byproducts i.e the 'trails' of thermal energy, chemical or radio frequency emission that an object leaves in its wake. These trails form distinct signatures, which can be exploited as reliable discriminators to characterize specific events or disclose hidden targets.

As with many branches of MASINT, specific techniques may overlap with the six major conceptual disciplines of MASINT defined by the Center for MASINT Studies and Research, which divides MASINT into Electro-optical, Nuclear, Geophysical, Radar, Materials, and Radiofrequency disciplines.

MASINT collection technologies in this area use radar, lasers, staring arrays in the infrared and visual, to point sensors at the information of interest. As opposed to IMINT, MASINT electro-optical sensors do not create pictures. Instead, they would indicate the coordinates, intensity, and spectral characteristics of a light source, such as a rocket engine, or a missile reentry vehicle. Electro-optical MASINT involves obtaining information from emitted or reflected energy, across the wavelengths of infrared, visible, and ultraviolet light. Electro-optical techniques include measurement of the radiant intensities, dynamic motion, and the materials composition of a target. These measurements put the target in spectral and spatial contexts. Sensors used in electro-optical MASINT include radiometers, spectrometers, non-literal imaging systems, lasers, or laser radar (LIDAR).

Observation of foreign missile tests, for example, make extensive use of MASINT along with other disciplines. For example, electro-optical and radar tracking establish trajectory, speed, and other flight characteristics that can be used to validate the TELINT telemetry intelligence being received by SIGINT sensors. Electro-optical sensors, which guide radars, operate on aircraft, ground stations, and ships.

== Airborne electro-optical missile tracking MASINT ==
U.S. RC-135S COBRA BALL aircraft have MASINT sensors that are "...two linked electro-optical sensors—the Real Time Optics System (RTOS) and the Large Aperture Tracker System (LATS). RTOS consists of an array of staring sensors encompassing a wide field of regard for target acquisition. LATS serves as an adjunct tracker. Due to its large aperture, it has significantly greater sensitivity and resolving power than the RTOS, but is otherwise similar.

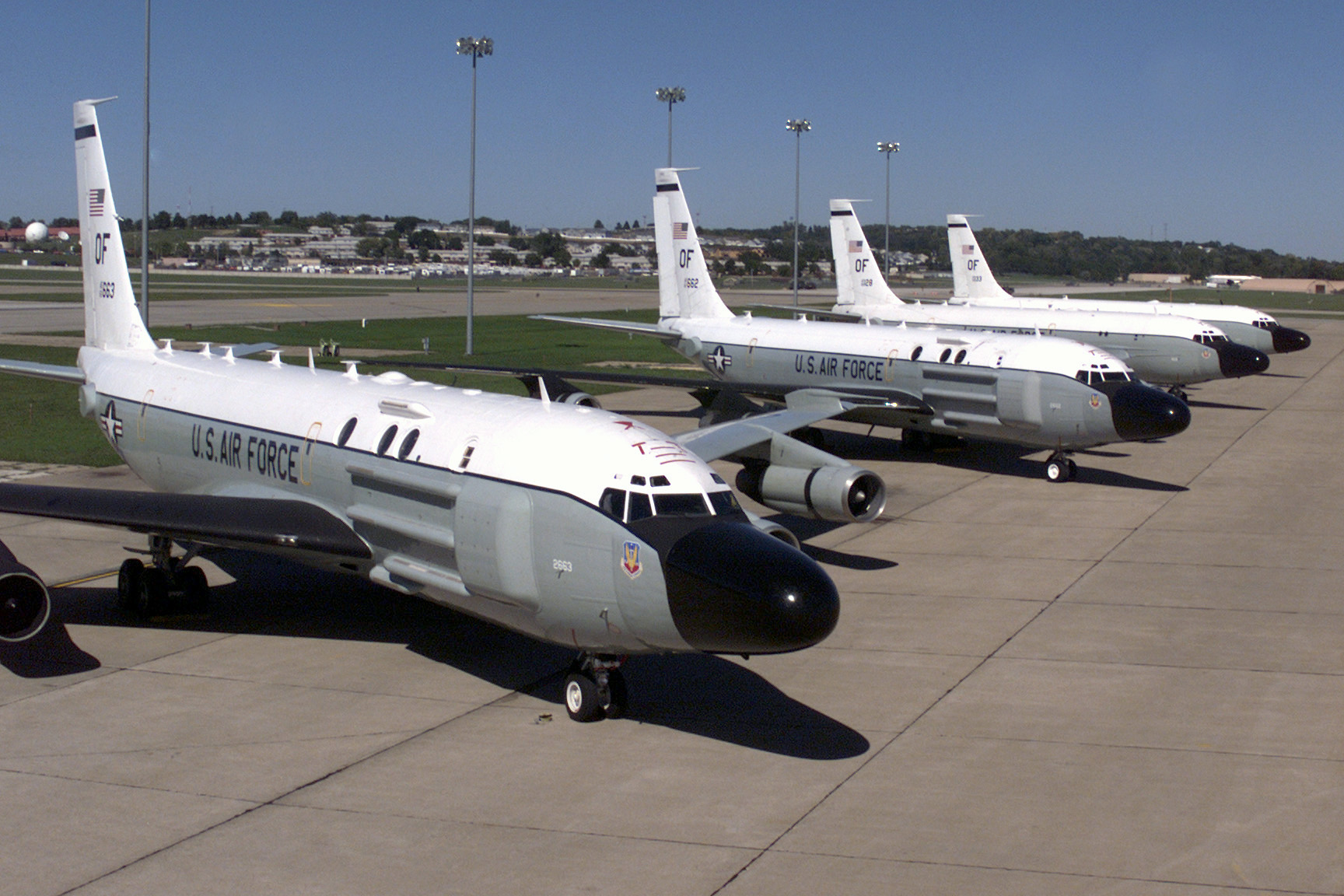
Two Cobra Ball aircraft on the flightline at Offutt Air Force Base, Nebraska.

There is a broader program to standardize the architecture of the various RC-135 aircraft, so that there will be greater commonality of parts, and some ability to switch missions: a COBRA BALL will be able to carry out some SIGINT missions of the RIVET JOINT RC-135.

COBRA BALL cues the COBRA DANE ground radar and the COBRA JUDY ship-based radar. See Radar MASINT

== Tactical counter-artillery sensors ==
Both electro-optical and radar sensors have been coupled with acoustic sensors in modern counter-artillery systems. Electro-optical sensors are directional and precise, so they need to be cued by acoustic or other omnidirectional sensors. The original Canadian sensors, in the First World War, used electro-optical flash as well as geophysical sound sensors.

=== Purple Hawk ===
Complementing counter-mortar radar is the Israeli Purple Hawk mast-mounted electro-optical sensor, which detects mortars and provides perimeter security. The device, remotely operated via fiber optics or microwave, is intended to have a laser designator.

=== Rocket launch spotter ===
A newer U.S. system couples an electro-optical and an acoustic system to produce the Rocket Artillery Launch Spotter (RLS). RLS combines components from two existing systems, the Tactical Aircraft Directed Infra-Red Countermeasures (TADIRCM) and the UTAMS . The two-color infrared sensors were originally designed to detect surface-to-air missiles for TADIRCM. Other TADIRCM components also have been adapted to RLS, including the computer processors, inertial navigation units (INU), and detection and tracking algorithms.

It is an excellent example of automatic cueing of one sensor by another. Depending on the application, the sensitive but less selective sensor is either acoustic or non-imaging electro-optical. The selective sensor is forward looking infrared radiation (FLIR).

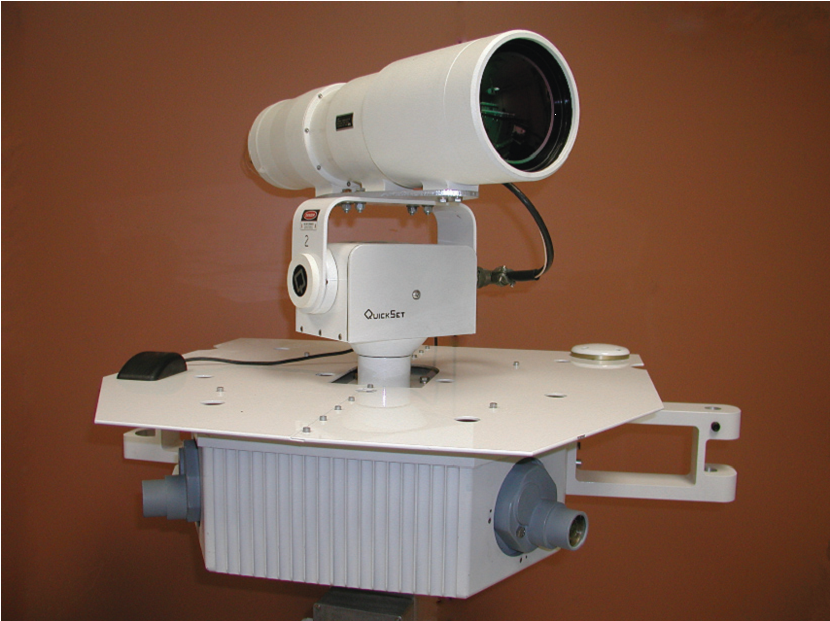
Electro-optical components of Rocket Launch Spotter system

RLS uses two TADIRCM sensors, an INU, and a smaller field-of-view single-color (FLIR) camera on each tower. The INU, which contains a GPS receiver, allows the electro-optical sensors to align to the azimuth and elevation of any detected threat signature.

The basic system mode is for rocket detection, since a rocket launch gives a bright flare. In basic operation, RLS has electro-optical systems on three towers, separated by 2 to 3 kilometers, to give omnidirectional coverage. The tower equipment connects to the control stations using a wireless network.

When a sensor measures a potential threat, the control station determines if it correlates with another measurement to give a threat signature. When a threat is recognized, RLS triangulates the optical signal and presents the Point of Origin (POO) on a map display. The nearest tower FLIR camera then is cued to the threat signature, giving the operator real-time video within 2 seconds of detection. When not in RLS mode, the FLIR cameras are available to the operator as surveillance cameras.

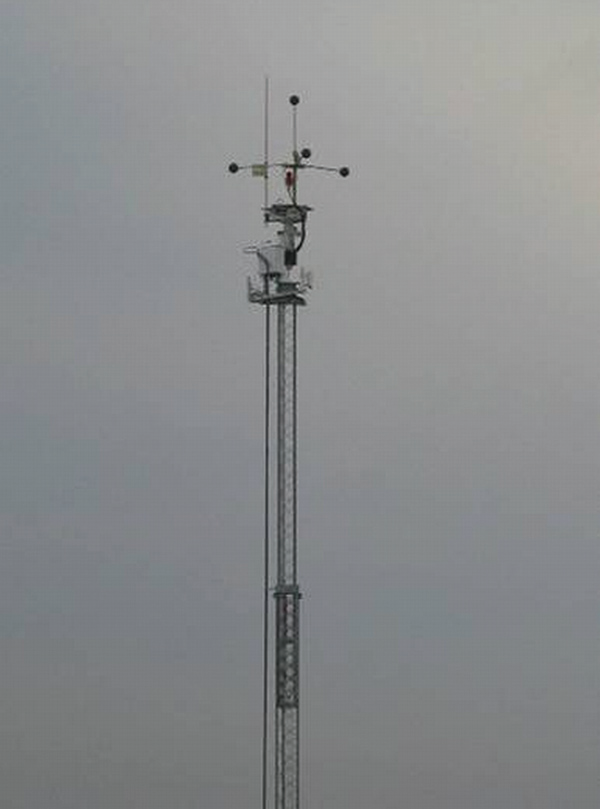
UTAMS-RLS tower head

Mortar launches do not produce as strong an electro-optical signature as does a rocket, so RLS relies on acoustic signature cueing from an Unattended Transient Acoustic Measurement and Signal Intelligence System (UTAMS). There is an UTAMS array at the top of each of the three RLS towers. The tower heads can be rotated remotely.

Each array consists of four microphones and processing equipment. Analyzing the time delays between an acoustic wavefront's interaction with each microphone in the array UTAMS provides an azimuth of origin. The azimuth from each tower is reported to the UTAMS processor at the control station, and a POO is triangulated and displayed. The UTAMS subsystem can also detect and locate the point of impact (POI), but, due to the difference between the speeds of sound and light, it may take UTAMS as long as 30 seconds to determine the POO for a rocket launch 13 km away. This means UTAMS may detect a rocket POI prior to the POO, providing very little if any warning time. but the electro-optical component of RLS will detect the rocket POO earlier.

== Infrared MASINT ==
While infrared IMINT and MASINT operate in the same wavelengths, MASINT does not "take pictures" in the conventional sense, but it can validate IMINT pictures. Where an IR IMINT sensor would take a picture that fills a frame, the IR MASINT sensor gives a list, by coordinate, of IR wavelengths and energy. A classic example of validation would be analyzing the detailed optical spectrum of a green area in a photograph: is the green from natural plant life, or is it camouflage paint?

The Army's AN/GSQ-187 Improved Remote Battlefield Sensor System (I-REMBASS) contains a Passive Infrared Sensor, DT-565/GSQ, which "detects tracked or wheeled vehicles and personnel. It also provides information on which to base a count of objects passing through its detection zone and reports their direction of travel relative to its location. The monitor uses two different [magnetic and passive infrared] sensors and their identification codes to determine direction of travel.

Shallow-water operations require generalizing IR imaging to include a non-developmental Thermal Imaging Sensor System (TISS) to surface ships with a day/night, high-resolution, infrared (IR) and visual imaging, and laser range-finder capability to augment existing optical and radar sensors, especially against small boats and floating mines. Similar systems are now available in Army helicopters and armored fighting vehicles.

== Optical measurement of nuclear explosions ==
There are several distinctive characteristics, in the range of visible light, from nuclear explosions. One of these is a characteristic "dual flash" measured by a bhangmeter. This went into routine use on the advanced Vela nuclear detection satellites, first launched in 1967. The earlier Velas only detected X-rays, gamma rays, and neutrons.

The bhangmeter technique was used earlier, in 1961, aboard a modified US KC-135B aircraft monitoring the previously announced Soviet test of Tsar Bomba, the largest nuclear explosion ever detonated. The US test monitoring, which carried both broadband electromagnetic and optical sensors including a bhangmeter, was named SPEEDLIGHT.

As part of Operation BURNING LIGHT, one MASINT system photographed the nuclear clouds of French atmospheric nuclear tests to measure their density and opacity. This operation is borderline with Nuclear MASINT.

Bhangmeters on Advanced Vela satellites detected what is variously called the Vela incident or South Atlantic Incident, on 22 September 1979. Different reports have claimed that it was, or was not, a nuclear test, and, if it was, probably involved South Africa and possibly Israel. France and Taiwan have also been suggested. Only one bhangmeter detected the characteristic double-flash, although US Navy hydrophones suggest a low-yield blast. Other sensors were negative or equivocal, and no definitive explanation has yet been made public.

== Schlieren Photography ==
Schlieren Photography can be used to detect Stealth aircraft, UAV, and missile flights even after engine cutoff. Schlieren analysis is based on the principle that any disturbances to the surrounding air may be detected (the Schlieren effect), like the shadow cast by the sun through the steam and hot air from a hot coffee, or even the Mirage wave effect caused by the hot air on pavement on a summer day. It is essentially the reverse of Adaptive optics, rather than minimizing the effect of atmospheric disturbance, Schlieren detection capitalizes on that effect. This form of MASINT is both optical and geophysical because of the optical detection of a geophysical (atmospheric) effect. Schlieren photography may be used to provide an early warning of an imminent threat or impending attack, and if sufficiently advanced, may be used in the elimination of stealth targets.

== Laser MASINT ==
This discipline includes both measuring the performance of lasers of interest, and using lasers as part of MASINT sensors. With respect to foreign lasers, focus of the collection is on laser detection, laser threat warning, and precise measurement of the frequencies, power levels, wave propagation, determination of power source, and other technical and operating characteristics associated with laser systems strategic and tactical weapons, range finders, and illuminators.

In addition to passive measurements of other lasers, the MASINT system can use active lasers (LIDAR) for distance measurements, but also for destructive remote sensing that provides energized material for spectroscopy. Close-in lasers could do chemical (i.e. materials MASINT) analysis of samples vaporized by lasers.

Laser systems are largely at a proof of concept level. One promising area is a synthetic imaging system that would be able to create images through forest canopy, but the current capability is much less than existing SAR or EO systems.

A more promising approach would image through obscurations such as dust, cloud, and haze, particularly in urban environments. The laser illuminator would send a pulse, and the receiver would capture only the first photons to return, minimizing scattering and blooming.

Use of LIDAR for precision elevation and mapping is much closer, and again chiefly in urban situations.

== Spectroscopic MASINT ==
Spectroscopy can be applied either to targets that are already excited, such as an engine exhaust, or stimulated with a laser or other energy source. It is not an imaging technique, although it can be used to extract greater information from images.

Where an IMINT sensor would take a picture that fills a frame, the Spectroscopic MASINT sensor gives a list, by coordinate, of wavelengths and energy. Multispectral IMINT is likely to discriminate more wavelengths, especially if it extends into the IR or UV, than a human being, even with an excellent color sense, could discriminate.

The results plot energy versus frequency. A spectral plot represents radiant intensity versus wavelength at an instant in time. The number of spectral bands in a sensor system determines the amount of detail that can be obtained about the source of the object being viewed. Sensor systems range from

- multi spectral (2 to 100 bands) to
- hyper spectral (100 to 1,000 bands) to
- ultra spectral (1,000+ bands).

More bands provide more discrete information, or greater resolution. The characteristic emission and absorption spectra serve to fingerprint or define the makeup of the feature that was observed. A radiometric plot represents the radiant intensity versus time; there can be plots at multiple bands or wavelengths. For each point along a time-intensity radiometric plot, a spectral plot can be generated based on the number of spectral bands in the collector, such as the radiant intensity plot of a missile exhaust plume as the missile is in flight. The intensity or brightness of the object is a function of several conditions including its temperature, surface properties or material, and how fast it is moving. Remember that additional, non-electro-optical sensors, such as ionizing radiation detectors, can correlate with these bands.

Advancing optical spectroscopy was identified as a high priority by a National Science Foundation workshop in supporting counterterrorism and general intelligence community needs. These needs were seen as most critical in the WMD context. The highest priority was increasing the sensitivity of spectroscopic scanners, since, if an attack has not actually taken place, the threat needs to be analyzed remotely. In the real world of attempting early warning, expecting to get a signature of something, which is clearly a weapon, is unrealistic. Consider that the worst chemical poisoning in history was an industrial accident, the Bhopal disaster. The participants suggested that the "intelligence community must exploit signatures of feedstock materials, precursors, by-products of testing or production, and other inadvertent or unavoidable signatures." False positives are inevitable, and other techniques need to screen them out.

Second to detectability, as a priority was rejecting noise and background. It is especially difficult for biowarfare agents, which are the greatest WMD challenge to detect by remote sensing rather than laboratory analysis of a sample. Methods may need to depend on signal enhancement, by clandestine dispersion of reagents in the area of interest, which variously could emit or absorb particular spectra. Fluorescent reactions are well known in the laboratory; could they be done remotely and secretly? Other approaches could pump the sample with an appropriately tuned laser, perhaps at several wavelengths. The participants stressed that the need to miniaturize sensors, which might enter the area in question using unmanned sensors, including miniaturized aerial, surface, and even subsurface vehicles.

Electro-optical spectroscopy is one means of chemical detection, especially using non-dispersive infrared radiation spectroscopy is one MASINT technology that lends itself to early warning of deliberate or actual releases. In general, however, chemical sensors tend to use a combination of gas chromatography and mass spectrometry, which are more associated with materials MASINT. See Chemical Warfare and Improvised Chemical Devices.

Laser excitation with multispectral return analysis is a promising chemical and possibly biological analysis method.

=== Multispectral MASINT ===
SYERS 2, on the high-altitude U-2 reconnaissance aircraft, is the only operational airborne military multi-spectral sensor, providing 7 bands of visual and infrared imagery at high resolution.

=== Hyperspectral MASINT ===
Hyperspectral MASINT involves the synthesis of images as seen by visible and near infrared light. US MASINT in this area is coordinated by the Hyperspectral MASINT Support to Military Operations (HYMSMO) project. This MASINT technology differs from IMINT in that it attempts to understand the physical characteristics of what is seen, not just what it looks like.

Hyperspectral imaging typically needs multiple imaging modalities, such as whiskbroom scanners, pushbroom scanners, tomographic, intelligent filters, and time series.

==== Design issues ====
Some of the major issues in visible and infrared hyperspectral processing include atmospheric correction, for the visible and short wave infrared. (0.4–2.5 micrometer) dictate sensor radiances need to be converted to surface reflectances. This dictates a need for measuring, and correcting for:

- atmospheric absorption and scattering
- aerosol optical depth,
- water vapor,
- correction for the effect of bi-directional reflectance distribution function,
- blurring due to the adjacency effect and retrieval of reflectance in shadows.

Hyperspectral, as opposed to multispectral, processing gives the potential of improved spectral signature measurement from airborne and spaceborne sensor platforms. Sensors on these platforms, however, must compensate for atmospheric effects. Such compensation is easiest with high contrast targets sensed through well-behaved atmosphere with even, reliable illumination, the real world will not always be so cooperative. For more complicated situations, one can not simply compensate for the atmospheric and illumination conditions by taking them out. The Invariant Algorithm for target detection was designed to find many possible combinations of these conditions for the image.

==== Sensors ====
Multiple organizations with several reference sensors are collecting libraries of hyperspectral signatures, starting with undisturbed areas such as deserts, forests, cities, etc.

- AHI, the Airborne Hyperspectral Imager, a hyperspectral sensor operating in the long-wave infrared spectrum for DARPA's Hyperspectral Mine Detection (HMD) program. AHI is a helicopter-borne LWIR hyperspectral imager with real time on-board radiometric calibration and mine detection.
- COMPASS, the Compact Airborne Spectral Sensor, a day-only sensor for 384 bands between from 400 to 2350 nm, being developed by the Army Night Vision and Electronic Sensors Directorate (NVESD).
- HyLite, Army day/night Hyperspectral Longwave Imager for the Tactical Environment.
- HYDICE, the HYperspectral Digital Imagery Collection Experiment built by Hughes Danbury Optical Systems and flight tested on a Convair 580.
- SPIRITT, the Air Force's Spectral Infrared Remote Imaging Transition Testbed, a day/night, long range reconnaissance imaging testbed composed of a hyperspectral sensor system with integrated high resolution imaging

==== Signature libraries ====
Under the HYMSMO program, there have been a number of studies to build hyperspectral imaging signatures in various kinds of terrain. Signatures of undisturbed forest, desert, island and urban areas are being recorded with sensors including COMPASS, HYDICE and SPIRITT. Many of these areas are also being analyzed with complementary sensors including synthetic aperture radar (SAR).

Hyperspectral Signature Library Development
Operation/environment	Date	Location
Desert Radiance I	October 1994	White Sands Missile Range, New Mexico
Desert Radiance II	June 1995	Yuma Proving Grounds, Arizona
Forest Radiance I (also had urban and waterfront components)	August 1995	Aberdeen Proving Grounds, Maryland
Island Radiance I (also had lake, ocean and shallow water components)	October 1995	Lake Tahoe, California/Nevada; Kaneohe Bay, Hawaii

A representative test range, with and without buried metal, is the Steel Crater Test Area at the Yuma Proving Grounds. This was developedfor radar measurements, but is comparable to other signature development areas for other sensors and may be used for hyperspectral sensing of buried objects.

==== Applications ====
In applications of intelligence interest, the Johns Hopkins University Applied Physics Laboratory (JHU/APL) has demonstrated that hyperspectral sensing allows discrimination of refined signatures, based on a large number of narrow frequency bands across a wide spectrum. These techniques can identify include military vehicle paints, characteristic of particular countries' signatures. They can differentiate camouflage from real vegetation. By detecting disturbances in earth, they can detect a wide variety of both excavation and buried materials. Roads and surfaces that have been lightly or heavily trafficked will produce different measurements than the reference signatures.

It can detect specific types of foliage supporting drug-crop identification; disturbed soil supporting the identification of mass graves, minefields, caches, underground facilities or cut foliage; and variances in soil, foliage, and hydrologic features often supporting NBC contaminant detection. This was done previously with false-color infrared photographic film, but electronics are faster and more flexible.

===== Minefield detection =====
JHU/APL target-detection algorithms have been applied to the Army Wide Area Airborne Minefield Detection (WAAMD) program's desert and forest. By using the COMPASS and AHI hyperspectral sensors, robust detection of both surface and buried minefields is achieved with very low false alarm rates.

===== Underground construction =====
Hyperspectral imaging can detect disturbed earth and foliage. In concert with other methods such as coherent light change detection radar, which can precisely measure changes in the height of the ground surface. Together, these can detect underground construction.

While still at a research level, Gravitimetric MASINT can, with these other MASINT sensors, give precise location information for deeply buried command centers, WMD facilities, and other critical target. It remains a truism that once a target can be located, it can be killed. "Bunker-buster" nuclear weapons are not needed when multiple precision guided bombs can successively deepen a hole until the no-longer-protected structure is reached.

===== Urban spectral target detection =====
Using data collected over US cities by the Army COMPASS and Air Force SPIRITT sensors, JHU/APL target detection algorithms are being applied to urban hyperspectral signatures. The ability to robustly detect unique spectral targets in urban areas denied for ground inspection, with limited ancillary information will assist in the development and deployment of future operational hyperspectral systems overseas.

===== Mass graves =====
Peace operations and war crimes investigation may require the detection of often-clandestine mass graves. Clandestinity makes it difficult to get witness testimony, or use technologies that require direct access to the suspected grave site (e.g., ground penetrating radar). Hyperspectral imaging from aircraft or satellites can provide remotely sensed reflectance spectra to help detect such graves. Imaging of an experimental mass grave and a real-world mass grave show that hyperspectral remote imaging is a powerful method for finding mass graves in real time, or, in some cases, retrospectively.

===== Ground order-of-battle target detection =====
JHU/APL target detection algorithms have been applied to the HYMSMO desert and forest libraries, and can reveal camouflage, concealment and deception protecting ground military equipment. Other algorithms have been demonstrated, using HYDICE data, that they can identify lines of communication based on the disturbance of roads and other ground surfaces.

===== Biomass estimation =====
Knowing the fractions of vegetation and soil helps to estimate the biomass. Biomass is not extremely important for military operations, but gives information for national-level economic and environmental intelligence. Detailed hyperspectral imagery such as the leaf chemical content (nitrogen, proteins, lignin and water) can be relevant to counterdrug surveillance.

== Space-based staring infrared sensors ==
The US, in 1970, launched the first of a series of space-based staring array sensors that detected and located infrared heat signatures, typically from rocket motors but also from other intense heat sources. Such signatures, which are associated with measurement of energy and location, are not pictures in the IMINT sense. Currently called the Satellite Early Warning System (SEWS), the program is the descendant of several generations of Defense Support Program (DSP) spacecraft. The USSR/Russian US-KMO spacecraft has been described, by US sources, as having similar capabilities to DSP.

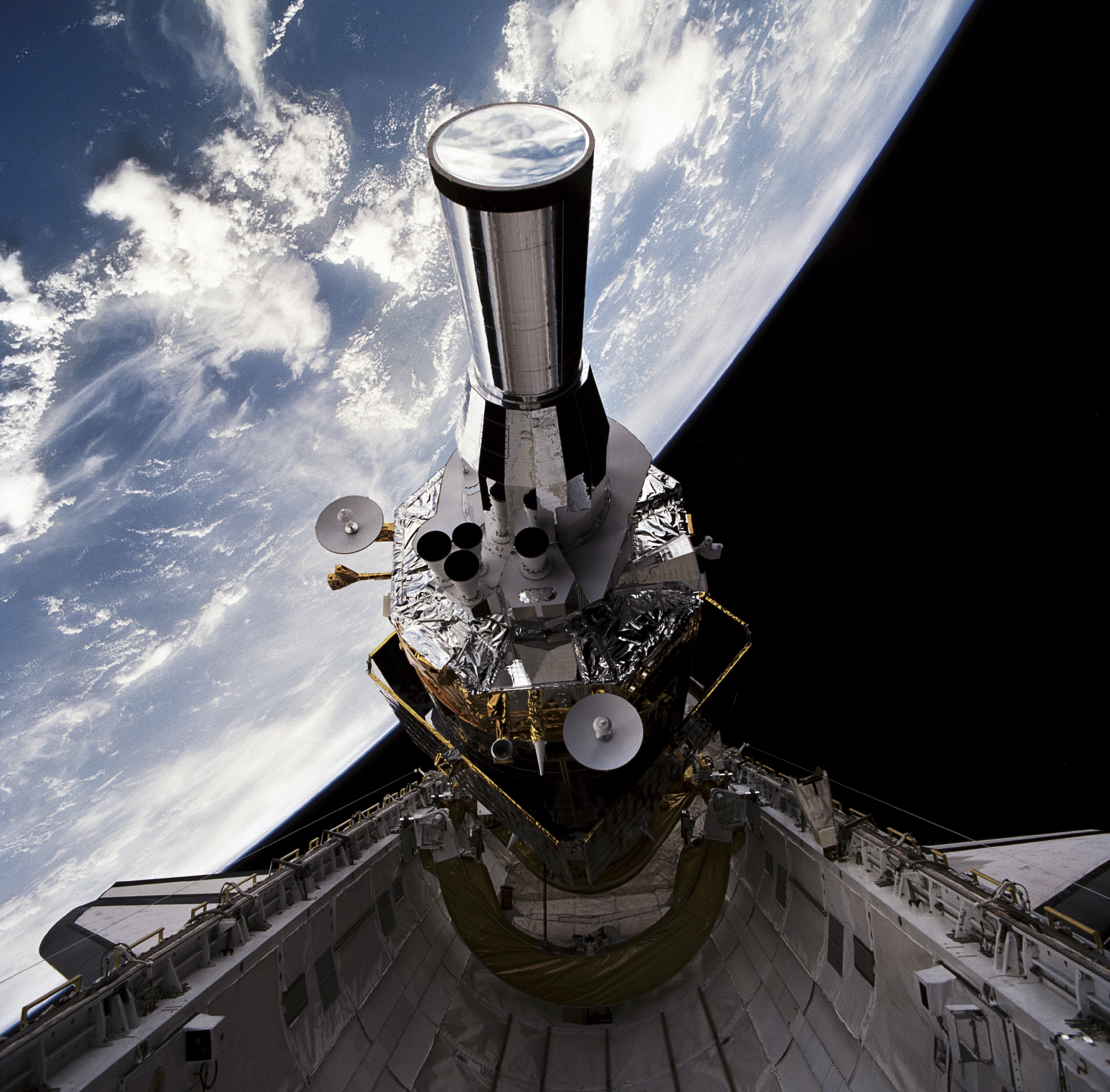
DSP satellite deployment during STS-44

Originally intended to detect the intense heat of an ICBM launch, this system proved useful at a theater level in 1990–1991. It detected the launch of Iraqi Scud missiles in time to give early warning to potential targets.

== Shallow water operations ==
Several new technologies will be needed for shallow-water naval operations. Since acoustic sensors (i.e., passive hydrophones and active sonar) perform less effectively in shallow waters than in the open seas, there is a strong pressure to develop additional sensors.

One family of techniques, which will require electro-optical sensors to detect, is bioluminescence: light generated by the movement of a vessel through plankton and other marine life. Another family, which may be solved with electro-optical methods, radar, or a combination, is detecting wakes of surface vessels, as well as effects on the water surface caused by underwater vessels and weapons.
