= HELRAS =

Naval helicopter undersea sensor

HELRAS or the Helicopter Long Range Active Sonar is a naval helicopter undersea sensor, a dipping sonar (a form of towed array sonar), deployed by helicopters of many naval air forces around the world to detect submarines; it is a form of geophysical MASINT.

== History ==
HELRAS was first developed in the 1970s by Bendix, FIAR and British Aerospace. Another rival system was called FLASH (Folding Light Acoustic System for Helicopters). In the 1980s, the system was supplied by Bendix.

A competitor of HELRAS is the Low Frequency Active Sonar (LFAS).

== Capability ==
It can detect submarines up to 60NM.

== Manufacture ==
Parts for the system are made by Rolls-Royce North America.

== Deployment ==
The system has been fitted to EH101, S70B, NH90, CH-148, AS532SC, AB412, and AS565 with helicopter of navies such as Italy, Turkey, Greece, Netherlands, Canada, Singapore, Thailand, Chile, Brazil, Indonesia, and Morocco. The system has also been fitted to unmanned surface vessels Seagull and RHIBs for Israel and USN.

== See also ==
- AN/SQQ-89
- HIDAS, made by Selex Galileo
- Light Airborne Multi-Purpose System
- Searchwater (radar), made by Thales UK
- SOSUS
- USHUS
