= Materials MASINT =

Discipline of Measurement and Signature Intelligence

Intelligence cycle management
Intelligence collection management
MASINT
- Electro-optical MASINT
- Nuclear MASINT
- Geophysical MASINT
- Radar MASINT
- Materials MASINT
- Radiofrequency MASINT

Materials MASINT is one of the six major disciplines generally accepted to make up the field of Measurement and Signature Intelligence (MASINT), with due regard that the MASINT subdisciplines may overlap, and MASINT, in turn, is complementary to more traditional intelligence collection and analysis disciplines such as SIGINT and IMINT. MASINT encompasses intelligence gathering activities that bring together disparate elements that do not fit within the definitions of Signals Intelligence (SIGINT), Imagery Intelligence (IMINT), or Human Intelligence (HUMINT).

According to the United States Department of Defense, MASINT is technically derived intelligence (excluding traditional imagery IMINT and signals intelligence SIGINT) that – when collected, processed, and analyzed by dedicated MASINT systems – results in intelligence that detects, tracks, identifies, or describes the signatures (distinctive characteristics) of fixed or dynamic target sources. MASINT was recognized as a formal intelligence discipline in 1986. Materials intelligence is one of the major MASINT disciplines. As with many branches of MASINT, specific techniques may overlap with the six major conceptual disciplines of MASINT defined by the Center for MASINT Studies and Research, which divides MASINT into Electro-optical, Nuclear, Geophysical, Radar, Materials, and Radiofrequency disciplines.

Materials MASINT involves the collection, processing, and analysis of gas, liquid, or solid samples, is critical in defense against chemical, biological, and radiological threats (CBR), or nuclear-biological-chemical (NBC), as well as more general safety and public health activities. It should be distinguished from the discipline of technical intelligence, which does overlap this discipline. To understand the difference, consider that there are multiple ways to understand the propellant of a new enemy weapon. A technical intelligence analyst would work with a captured example of the weapon, or at least pieces of it, to come to that understanding. The technical intelligence analyst might eventually fire the weapon under controlled circumstances.

In contrast, a materials MASINT analyst would collect information on the weapon principally through remote sensing directed on the enemy's use of the weapon. The materials MASINT analysis may learn more about the way the enemy actually uses the weapon, while the technical intelligence analyst may understand more about the manufacture, maintainability, and skills required to use the weapon.

== Disciplines ==
MASINT is made up of six major disciplines, but the disciplines overlap and intertwine. They interact with the more traditional intelligence disciplines of HUMINT, IMINT, and SIGINT. To be more confusing, while MASINT is highly technical and is called such, TECHINT is another discipline, dealing with such things as the analysis of captured equipment.

An example of the interaction is "imagery-defined MASINT (IDM)". In IDM, a MASINT application would measure the image, pixel by pixel, and try to identify the physical materials, or types of energy, that are responsible for pixels or groups of pixels: signatures. When the signatures are then correlated to precise geography, or details of an object, the combined information becomes something greater than the whole of its IMINT and MASINT parts.

The Center for MASINT Studies and Research breaks MASINT into:

- Electro-optical MASINT
- Nuclear MASINT
- Geophysical MASINT
- Radar MASINT
- Radiofrequency MASINT
- Materials MASINT

Samples for materials MASINT can be collected by automatic equipment, such as air samplers, indirectly by humans. Samples, once collected, may be rapidly characterized or undergo extensive forensic laboratory analysis to determine the identity and characteristics of the sources of the samples.

== Materials collection ==
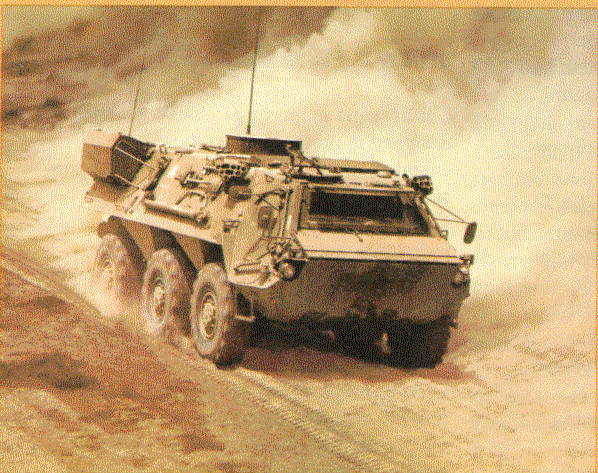
US government photo of Fuchs/XM93 tactical NBC reconnaissance vehicle

The Fuchs (German for Fox) NBC reconnaissance vehicle is an example of the tactical state of the art for land warfare. This system, in various versions, is used by Germany, the Netherlands, Saudi Arabia, Norway, the UK, the US and UAE. German forces first used it in Kosovo, but the US bought the German units for use in Desert Storm, after modifying it into the XM93. This vehicle can keep up with moving troops, detecting liquid and vapor hazards. Newer versions, like the M1135 nuclear, biological, and chemical reconnaissance vehicle (NBCRV), have enhanced radiation survey, meteorological, chemical, and biological sensors, as well as computer support for . The newer systems are intended for both a CBR battlefield and release other than attack (ROTA) events. ROTA events include industrial accidents as well as terrorist incidents. Its computer systems, complemented by meteorological information and signature information on the CBR agents, can predict propagation and report it using tactical symbols and NBC reports NATO standards ATP45(C).

For airborne sample collection, the pattern increasingly is to use unmanned aerial vehicles (UAV). Still, for long-range missions, a U-2 or reconnaissance version of the C-135 (US) or Nimrod (UK) might be used.

== Chemical materials MASINT ==
There are a wide range of reasons to do chemical analysis of substances to which one's own forces are exposed, as well as learning the nature and signatures of a wide range of chemicals used by other nations.

=== Ammunition, explosive, and rocket propellant analysis ===
Traditional chemical analysis, as well as techniques such as spectroscopy using remote laser excitation, are routine parts of materials intelligence, in contrast to TECHINT evaluating the firing of the material.

=== Chemical warfare and improvised chemical devices ===
Since the advent of chemical warfare in the First World War, there has been an urgent operational requirement for detecting chemical attacks. Early methods depended on color changes in chemically treated paper, or even more lengthy and insensitive manual methods.

To assess a modern chemical sensor, several parameters can be combined to create a figure of merit called the receiver operating characteristic (ROC). These parameters are sensitivity, probability of correct detection, false positive rate and response time. Ideally, the device can have the parameters adjusted for specific situation. It may be more important that the device has a low false positive rate (i.e., is selective, with a low rate of false negatives) or is maximally sensitive, which means accepting false positives. ROC curves are commonly drawn to show sensitivity as a function of false positive rate for a given detection confidence and response time. Too high a false positive rate, without an operator that understands the context, can cause real alarms to be ignored. In an environment where terrorists may improvise, it is not enough to detect formal chemical weapons, but at least 100 highly toxic industrial chemicals from which a weapon could be improvised. (Clarke 2006).

Modern chemical weapon detection is highly automated. One technique involves continual sampling of air through a nondispersive infrared analyzer. More complex instrumentation, such as gas chromatographs coupled to mass spectrometers, are standard laboratory techniques that need to be modified for the field. (Vesser 2001) chemical analysis capability is built around an MM-1 mobile mass spectrometer and air/surface sampler. The US version adds the M43A1 detector component of the first US automatic chemical detector, the 1970s vintage M8.

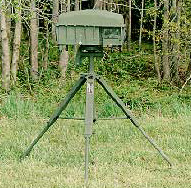
M21 detector

After Desert Storm field experience, where troops had overestimated the detection capability of the highly selective, but not extremely sensitive, MM-1. A Remote Sensing Chemical Agent Alarm (M21), which is a Fourier transform infrared spectrometer, a form of infrared spectroscopy, that exploits the property that organophosphates, to which the nerve agents belong, have a distinctive signature. The M21 detects chemical agent hazards at line-of-sight distance up to five kilometers away. Adding the M21 has improved the Fox's vapor detection capabilities and provides more advance warning of a possible vapor chemical warfare agent hazard.

The M21 does not know if it is sensing a specific chemical warfare such as sarin or an organophosphate insecticide such as malathion. This means that a sensor may give false positives.

Malathion, for example, while not as toxic as a true chemical weapon, very well could be used by terrorists or could be spilled by an accident, in a concentration that may be dangerous. The insecticide parathion is sufficiently toxic that it might be tried as an improvised chemical attack. More specific chemical detectors, however, have tended to have either the signatures of chemical weapons or of industrial chemicals.

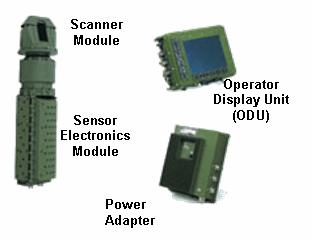
Artemis chemical detector

The M21 will be succeeded by the Artemis, formerly the Joint Service Lightweight Standoff Chemical Agent Detector (JSLSCAD), which, as opposed to the narrow field of view of the M21, has 360 degree ground coverage and 60 degree air coverage. The Navy is the program manager for Artemis. It is based on LASER radar (LIDAR), detects chemical agent aerosols, vapor, and surface contamination, and gives range from the sensor to the threat. Artemis is being made by a team from Intelletic, Honeywell Technology Center, OPTRA, Inc. and Recon/Optical, Inc. Artemis is not man-portable, so the Army is managing a program for Automatic Chemical Agent Detector and Alarm (ACADA), which will replace the existing M8A1, and operate with the M279 Surface Sampler. This system can be used on helicopters and ships as well as in vehicles or on a ground tripod.

The handheld Improved Chemical Agent Monitor (ICAM) is a hand-held device for monitoring specific chemical agent (i.e., mustard and nerve gas) contamination on surfaces. It works by sensing the molecular ions of specific mobilities (time-of-flight), with software to help analysis.

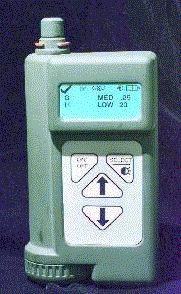
Joint Chemical Agent Detector (US Navy)

JCAD, the Joint Chemical Agent Detector, is pocket-sized detector that will detect, identify and quantify chemical agents, in real time, on ships and aircraft. It uses surface acoustic wave technology. The Air Force manages the contract with BAE.

Being built by TRW for the US Marine Corps, the Joint Service Lightweight Nuclear, Biological, Chemical Reconnaissance System (JSLNBCRS) is vehicle-mounted in the HMMWV and LAV. It will detect chemical agents using mass spectrometry.

The Proengin AP2C handheld chemical warfare (CW) agent detector uses flame spectroscopy. It had been restricted to CW agents (AP2C detector) or industrial compounds (toxic industrial materials (TIMS) detector). The newer A4C can detect true chemical agents, as well 49 of 58 chemicals on NATO’s toxic industrial chemical (TIC)/TIM list while avoiding common false positives such as methyl salicylate (synthetic oil of wintergreen). The emitted light is sensed through element-specific filters (AP2C) or on height sensitive spectrometer. The latter directs the light to a diffraction grating on a multi-photodiode detector.

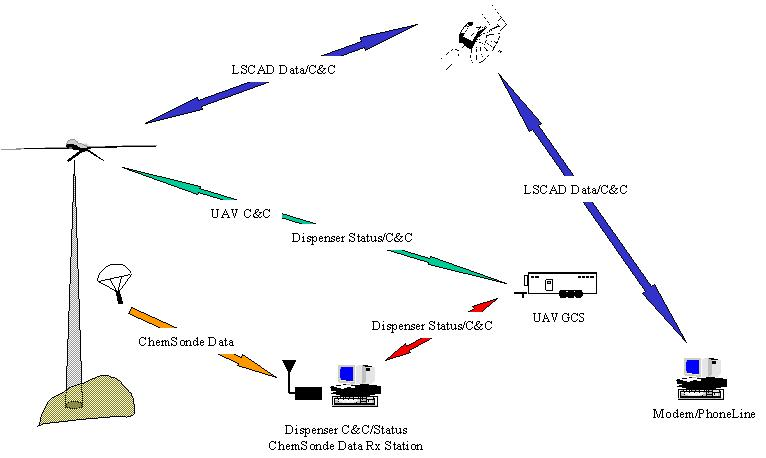
CADDIE System Architecture

A different approach than troop protection may be appropriate for wide-area chemical survey. The Chemical Agent Dual-Detection Identification Experiment (CADDIE) was developed by the US Navy as a feasibility demonstration of an Unmanned Aerial Vehicle using onboard sensors to locate a suspicious cloud, and then drop disposable ChemSonde sensors into it.

This system demonstrated several characteristics of modern MASINT: a broad-look capability, as with pushbroom radar, and then a close-look with the disposable sensors. The sensors are released from an off-the-shelf ALE-47 Countermeasure Dispenser System, which normally holds chaff, flares, or expendable jammers.

== Biological materials MASINT ==
In modern materials analysis, the line between chemical and biological methods can blur, since immunochemistry, an important discipline, uses biologically created reagents to detect chemical and biological substances. Key characteristics of a technique that can be adapted to field use, as opposed to slow and labor-intensive methods such as culture-based identification, depend on a probe that recognizes and reacts with a molecule, receptor, or other feature of the organism, and a separate transducer recognizes the positive results of the probe and provides it to the operator. The combination is what determines analysis time, sensitivity and specificity. The major families of probe methods are: nucleic acid, antibody/antigen binding, and ligand/receptor interactions. Transducer techniques include: electrochemical, piezoelectric, colorimetric, and optical spectrometric systems.

=== Biological warfare detection ===
A wide range of analytical tools are used in modern microbiological laboratories, and many can be adapted to field use Some that have been adapted include:

- Hand-held assays (HHA), similar to pregnancy test strips. Price per operational panel of 8: $65.11, as of 1 Oct 2012.
- Electrochemicaluminescence immunoassay, to be in the M1-M analyzer scheduled for 2005.
- Polymerase chain reaction (PCR), for confirmatory tests. Available for 10 biological agents in 2004.
- Enzyme-linked immunosorbent analysis ELISA on particles filtered from the air.

The original Fuchs, and the slightly modified version fielded by the US in 1991, had biological protection for the crew, but no biological analysis capability. An interim version, the Fuchs biological reconnaissance system (BRS), continually monitored outside air for particulate matter that could be biological weapons, and, if detected would transfer them to a biological safety cabinet (i.e., sealed glove box) for analysis using a variety of genetic and immunologic tests. This interim version, however, involves an NBC Field Laboratory set of vehicles and shelters, not a single mobile system:

- Radiation and HazMat (Hazardous Materials) Analysis Lab Shelter
- Biological Analysis Lab Shelters
- Chemical Analysis Lab Shelter
- Command and Sampling Vehicle (the Fuchs proper)

The entire system is transportable by air, ship, or truck (the latter with the Command and Sampling Vehicle self-deploying).

The latest Fuchs 2 version, ordered by the UAE in March 2005 for delivery in 2007, will feature an integrated equipment set, to go inside the glove box, for detecting biological weapons. Analytical methods include ELISA, Polymerase Chain Reaction (PCR), Liquid chromatography-mass spectrometry (LC-MS), and high performance (also called high pressure) liquid chromatography (HPLC). These methods rarely can instantly identify a biological agent, but can give preliminary results, with an adequate sample, in minutes to hours.

The Fuchs 2 also has weather sensors that can help predict the propagation of contaminants. See weather MASINT.

The US Army is implementing an interim Biological Integrated Detection System (BIDS) made by the team Bio Road, Bruker Analytical Systems, Environmental Technologies Group, Harris Corp, and Marion Composites. Also under the Army is the Joint Biological Point Detection System (JBPDS), which will succeed the Army's BIDS. It will also replace the Navy IBADS and give initial capability to the Air Force and Marines. It has complementary trigger, sampler, detector and identification technologies to rapidly and automatically detect and identify biological threat agents. Multiple agents will be detected in a maximum of 15 minutes. JBPDS is built by Batelle and Lockheed Martin.

China also has a BW detection capability. In keeping with the definition of BW as "public health in reverse," PRC writings on the subject treat the matter more in terms of infectious disease control, an approach that is standard everywhere. As one would expect, considerable amount of research has been conducted in China on potential BW agents including tularemia, Q fever, plague, anthrax, West and Eastern Equine Encephalitis, psittacosis, among others.

Some specialized equipment has also been fielded in some unspecified numbers to counter the threat of BW to PLA troops:

- Type 76 Microbe Sampling Kit: First introduced in 1975, and includes the 76-1 variant, this portable laboratory can test surface, waterborne, and airborne particles to determine the presence of BW agent threats, and it also has five different types of insect and small animal reference specimens. Resembling a low-tech gravitation/settle plate, a small, rotating mechanism is placed windward, and aerosol particles will adhere to the sampling or petri dish. Disinfectant is supplied along with culturing supplies.
- Large-Volume Electrostatic Air Sampler: This equipment has no classification number, and little information is provided concerning its attributes. It probably is similar to the corona discharge-based large volume air sampler (LVAS) used in the West. This technology in general offers excellent results, and it is capable of isolating viral particles from the air, including rabies and human respiratory disease viruses.
- JWL-I Model Bioaerosol Sampler: Like the LVAS mentioned above, the reference to this equipment offers little in the way of details. This automated air sampler resembles most closely a single stage impactor, drawing in air and depositing aerosolized particles onto agar for further testing. An example of this type of instrumentation is the Casella slit-to-agar, a single-stage impactor used in civilian environmental monitoring.
- WJ-85 microbiological laboratory vehicles were introduced in 1984, which could have resulted in a motorized laboratory platform, described as somewhere between "a railway car and a sedan", is separated into three sections, with airtight sealed gaskets on the doorways. The forward section houses the driver and carriage for occupants, the midsection contains the laboratory room (See Mobile BW Assessment Laboratory), and the rear section contains a decontamination apparatus plus extra clothing. Laboratory equipment includes a glass glove box for handling infectious material, a bacteriostatic device, a refrigerator, an incubator (hengwenxiang), a fluorescent microscope, an inverted microscope, culture media, diagnostic reagents, cell culture instruments, etc. A separate station allows testing for bacteria and viruses, accommodating up to four people. Some 200 bacteria and 50 virus samples for reference and identification are supplied with the laboratory vehicle.

=== Biological counterproliferation MASINT ===
One of the challenges of preventing the proliferation of biological warfare capability is verifying that a legitimate bioengineering facility is not producing weapons. Since many completely legal processes involve trade secrets, production facilities can be reluctant to allow detailed inspection and sampling of what might be a commercial advantage. The Henry L. Stimson Center has done a good deal of conceptual work on an inspection regimen, in which inspectors would use biological tests that looked for genetic materials associated with known weapons. Even when a potential weapon, such as Clostridium botulinum exotoxin (Botox or "botulinus toxin") is discovered, the amounts or preparation may be such that it can be established the use is for legitimate medical, veterinary, or research applications.

These approaches to detecting violations of "dual use" also have the potential for recognizing epidemic organisms in a public health context.

=== Personnel detectors ===
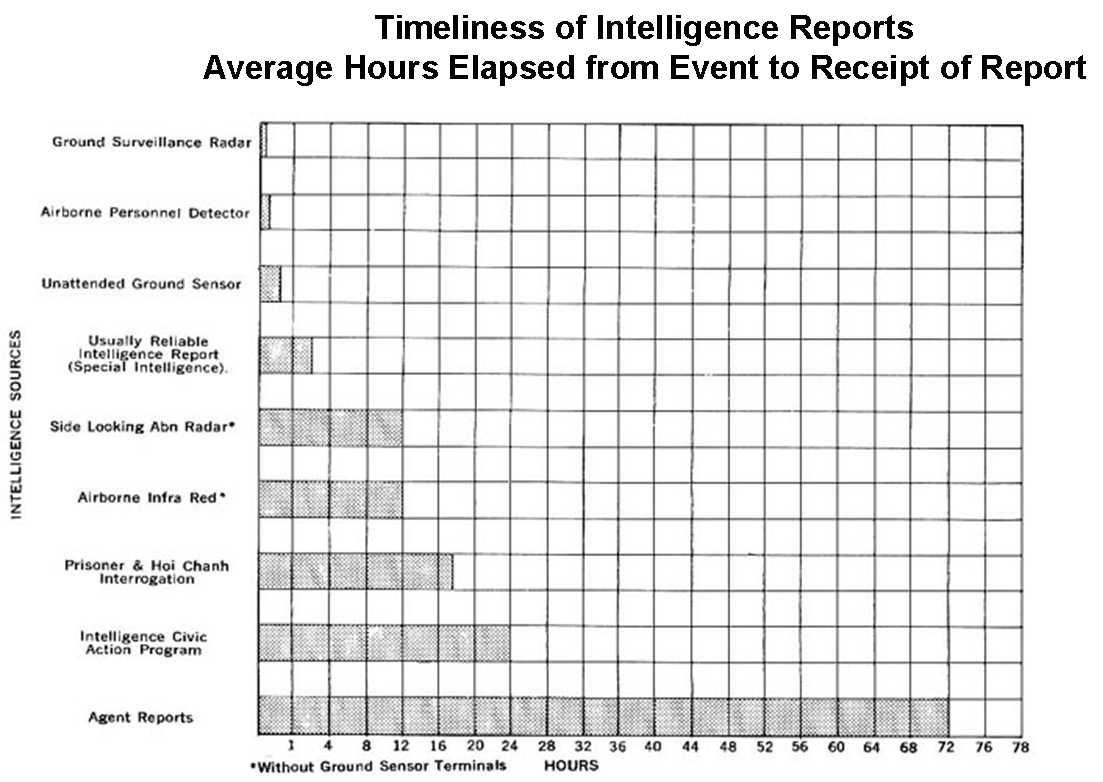
Relative effectiveness of intelligence sources in the Vietnam War, showing the delay in hours between receipt of information and action, the "people sniffer" operated in real-time with essentially zero delay.

A Vietnam-era sensor, the XM2, generally known as the "people sniffer", detected ammonia concentrations in air, which indicated the presence of groups of people or animals. While it was sensitive, but not selective for people, many water buffalo became targets. Nevertheless, it was considered the best sensor used by the 9th Infantry Division, because, as opposed to other MASINT and SIGINT sensors, it could give helicopter-borne troops real-time detection of targets As seen in the attached chart, it is compared, in terms of timeliness, to a number of other sensors.

== Nuclear test analysis ==
Monitoring nuclear tests involves both chemical analysis, part of materials MASINT, and analysis of the radioactive emissions of samples, which crosses materials and nuclear MASINT. Not all nuclear MASINT involves materials analysis; see space-based radiation and EMP MASINT sensors.

Nuclear tests, including underground tests that vent into the atmosphere, produce fallout that not only indicates that a nuclear event has taken place, but, through radiochemical analysis of radionuclides in the fallout, characterize the technology and source of the device. MASINT collection of fallout is most commonly done with airborne dust traps, either on manned aircraft or drones.

During FY 1974, SAC missions were flown to gather information on Chinese and French tests. U-2R aircraft, in Operation OLYMPIC RACE, flew missions, near Spain, to capture actual airborne particles that meteorologists predicted would be in that airspace. Another portion of this program involved a US Navy ship, in international waters, that sent unmanned air sampling drones into the cloud. So, in 1974, both U-2R and drone aircraft captured actual airborne particles from nuclear blasts for the MASINT discipline of nuclear Materials Intelligence.

In the current M1135 nuclear, biological, and chemical reconnaissance vehicle and previous US NBC tactical monitoring vehicle, the M93 Fox (which is derived from the German radiation detection version of the TPz Fuchs), is built around the AN/VDR2 radioactivity, detection, indication, and computation (RADIAC) set, capable of measuring beta and gamma radiation both inside and outside the vehicle. This system was first used during Desert Storm.

It is not only important to detect that a nuclear event occurred, but what produced the event. In the context of the North Korean tests, one proposed method involved measuring xenon concentrations in the air. Xenon is a by-product of different fissionable materials' reactions, so could be used to distinguish if air sampling from a North Korean test, either atmospheric testing or leakage from an underground test, could be used to determine if the bomb was nuclear, and, if so, whether the Primary was plutonium or highly enriched uranium (HEU)
