= Geophysical MASINT =

Type of intelligence gathering

Intelligence cycle management
Intelligence collection management
MASINT
- Electro-optical MASINT
- Nuclear MASINT
- Geophysical MASINT
- Radar MASINT
- Materials MASINT
- Radiofrequency MASINT

Geophysical MASINT is a branch of Measurement and Signature Intelligence (MASINT) that involves phenomena transmitted through the earth (ground, water, atmosphere) and manmade structures including emitted or reflected sounds, pressure waves, vibrations, and magnetic field or ionosphere disturbances.

According to the United States Department of Defense, MASINT has technically derived intelligence (excluding traditional imagery IMINT and signals intelligence SIGINT) that—when collected, processed, and analyzed by dedicated MASINT systems—results in intelligence that detects, tracks, identifies or describes the signatures (distinctive characteristics) of fixed or dynamic target sources. MASINT was recognized as a formal intelligence discipline in 1986. Another way to describe MASINT is a "non-literal" discipline. It feeds on a target's unintended emissive by-products, the "trails"—the spectral, chemical or RF that an object leaves behind. These trails form distinct signatures, which can be exploited as reliable discriminators to characterize specific events or disclose hidden targets."

As with many branches of MASINT, specific techniques may overlap with the six major conceptual disciplines of MASINT defined by the Center for MASINT Studies and Research, which divides MASINT into Electro-optical, Nuclear, Geophysical, Radar, Materials, and Radiofrequency disciplines.

== Military requirements ==
Geophysical sensors have a long history in conventional military and commercial applications, from weather prediction for sailing, to fish finding for commercial fisheries, to nuclear test ban verification. New challenges, however, keep emerging.

For first-world military forces opposing other conventional militaries, there is an assumption that if a target can be located, it can be destroyed. As a result, concealment and deception have taken on new criticality. "Stealth" low-observability aircraft have gotten much attention, and new surface ship designs feature observability reduction. Operating in a confusing littoral environment produces a great deal of concealing interference.

Of course, submariners feel they invented low observability, and others are simply learning from them. They know that going deep or at least ultraquiet, and hiding among natural features, makes them very hard to detect.

Two families of military applications, among many, represent new challenges against which geophysical MASINT can be tried. Also, see Unattended Ground Sensors.

=== Deeply buried structures ===
One of the easiest ways for nations to protect weapons of mass destruction, command posts, and other critical structures is to bury them deeply, perhaps by enlarging natural caves or disused mines. Deep burial is not only a means of protection against physical attack, as even without the use of nuclear weapons, there are deeply penetrating precision-guided bombs that can attack them. Deep burial, with appropriate concealment during construction, is a way to avoid the opponent's knowing the buried facility's position well enough to direct precision-guided weapons against it.

Finding deeply buried structures, therefore, is a critical military requirement. The usual first step in finding a deep structure is IMINT, especially using hyperspectral IMINT sensors to help eliminate concealment. "Hyperspectral images can help reveal information not obtainable through other forms of imagery intelligence such as the moisture content of soil. This data can also help distinguish camouflage netting from natural foliage." Still, a facility dug under a busy city would be extremely hard to find during construction. When the opponent knows that it is suspected that a deeply buried facility exists, there can be a variety of decoys and lures, such as buried heat sources to confuse infrared sensors, or simply digging holes and covering them, with nothing inside.

MASINT using acoustic, seismic, and magnetic sensors would appear to have promise, but these sensors must be fairly close to the target. Magnetic Anomaly Detection (MAD) is used in antisubmarine warfare, for final localization before an attack. The existence of the submarine is usually established through passive listening and refined with directional passive sensors and active sonar.

Once these sensors (as well as HUMINT and other sources) have failed, there is promise for surveying large areas and deeply concealed facilities using gravitimetric sensors. Gravity sensors are a new field, but military requirements are making it important while the technology to do it is becoming possible.

=== Naval operations in shallow water ===
In today's "green water" and "brown water" naval applications, navies are looking at MASINT solutions to meet new challenges of operating in littoral areas of operations. This symposium found it useful to look at five technology areas: acoustics and geology and geodesy/sediments/transport, nonacoustical detection (biology/optics/chemistry), physical oceanography, coastal meteorology, and electromagnetic detection.

Although it is unlikely there will ever be another World War II-style opposed landing on a fortified beach, another aspect of the littoral is being able to react to opportunities for amphibious warfare. Detecting shallow-water and beach mines remain a challenge since mine warfare is a deadly "poor man's weapon."

While initial landings from an offshore force would be from helicopters or tiltrotor aircraft, with air cushion vehicles bringing ashore larger equipment, traditional landing craft, portable causeways, or other equipment will eventually be needed to bring heavy equipment across a beach. The shallow depth and natural underwater obstacles can block beach access to these crafts and equipment, as can shallow-water mines. Synthetic Aperture Radar (SAR), airborne laser detection and ranging (LIDAR) and the use of bioluminescence to detect wake trails around underwater obstacles all may help solve this challenge.

Moving onto and across the beach has its own challenges. Remotely operated vehicles may be able to map landing routes, and they, as well as LIDAR and multispectral imaging, may be able to detect shallow water. Once on the beach, the soil has to support heavy equipment. Techniques here include estimating soil type from multispectral imaging, or from an airdropped penetrometer that actually measures the loadbearing capacity of the surface.

== Weather and sea intelligence MASINT ==
The science and art of weather prediction used the ideas of measurement and signatures to predict phenomena, long before there were any electronic sensors. Masters of sailing ships might have no more sophisticated instrument than a wetted finger raised to the wind, and the flapping of sails.

Weather information, in the normal course of military operations, has a major effect on tactics. High winds and low pressures can change artillery trajectories. High and low temperatures cause both people and equipment to require special protection. Aspects of weather, however, also can be measured and compared with signatures, to confirm or reject the findings of other sensors.

The state of art is to fuse meteorological, oceanographic, and acoustic data in a variety of display modes. Temperature, salinity and sound speed can be displayed horizontally, vertically, or in a three-dimensional perspective.

=== Predicting weather based on measurements and signatures ===
While early sailors had no sensors beyond their five senses, the modern meteorologist has a wide range of geophysical and electro-optical measuring devices, operating on platforms from the bottom of the sea to deep space. Predictions based on these measurements are based on signatures of past weather events, a deep understanding of theory, and computational models.

Weather predictions can give significant negative intelligence when the signature of some combat systems is such that they can operate only under certain weather conditions. The weather has long been an extremely critical part of modern military operations, as when the decision to land at Normandy on June 6, rather than June 5, 1944, depended on Dwight D. Eisenhower's trust in his staff weather advisor, Group Captain James Martin Stagg. It is rarely understood that something as fast as a ballistic missile reentry vehicle, or as "smart" as a precision guided munition, can still be affected by winds in the target area.

As part of Unattended Ground Sensors,. The Remote Miniature Weather Station (RMWS), from System Innovations, is an air-droppable version with a lightweight, expendable and modular system with two components: a meteorological (MET) sensor and a ceilometer (cloud ceiling height) with limited MET. The basic MET system is surface-based and measures wind speed and direction, horizontal visibility, surface atmospheric pressure, air temperature and relative humidity. The ceilometer sensor determines cloud height and discrete cloud layers. The system provides near-real-time data capable of 24-hour operation for 60 days. The RMWS can also go in with US Air Force Special Operations combat weathermen

The man-portable version, brought in by combat weathermen, has an additional function, as a remote miniature ceilometer. Designed to measure multiple layer cloud ceiling heights and then send that data via satellite communications link to an operator display, the system uses a Neodinum YAG (NdYAG), 4 megawatt non-eye safe laser. According to one weatherman, "We have to watch that one," he said. "Leaving it out there basically we're worried about civilian populace going out there and playing with it—firing the laser and there goes somebody's eye. There are two different units [to RMWS]. One has the laser and one doesn't. The basic difference is the one with the laser is going to give you cloud height."

=== Hydrographic sensors ===
Hydrographic MASINT is subtly different from weather, in that it considers factors such as water temperature and salinity, biological activities, and other factors that have a major effect on sensors and weapons used in shallow water. ASW equipment, especially acoustic performance depends on the season of the specific coastal site. Water column conditions, such as temperature, salinity, and turbidity are more variable in shallow than deep water. Water depth will influence bottom bounce conditions, as will the material of the bottom. Seasonal water column conditions (particularly summer versus winter) are inherently more variable in shallow water than in deep water.

While much attention is given to shallow waters of the littoral, other areas have unique hydrographic characteristics.

- Regional areas with freshwater eddies
- Open ocean salinity fronts
- Near ice floes
- Under ice

A submarine tactical development activity observed, "Freshwater eddies exist in many areas of the world. As we have experienced recently in the Gulf of Mexico using the Tactical Oceanographic Monitoring System (TOMS), there exist very distinct surface ducts that causes the Submarine Fleet Mission Program Library (SFMPL) sonar prediction to be unreliable. Accurate bathythermic information is paramount and a precursor for accurate sonar predictions."

==== Temperature and salinity ====
Critical to the prediction of sound, needed by active and passive MASINT systems operating in water is knowing the temperature and salinity at specific depths. Antisubmarine aircraft, ships, and submarines can release independent sensors that measure the water temperature at various depths. The water temperature is critically important in acoustic detections, as changes in water temperature at thermoclines can act as a "barrier" or "layer" to acoustic propagation. To hunt a submarine, which is aware of water temperature, the hunter must drop acoustic sensors below the thermocline.

Water conductivity is used as a surrogate marker for salinity. The current and most recently developed software, however, does not give information on suspended material in the water or bottom characteristics, both considered critical in shallow-water operations.

The US Navy does this by dropping expendable probes, which transmit to a recorder, of 1978-1980 vintage, the AN/BQH-7 for submarines and the AN/BQH-71 for surface ships. While the redesign of the late seventies did introduce digital logic, the devices kept hard-to-maintain analog recorders, and maintainability became critical by 1995. A project was begun to extend with COTS components, to result in the AN/BQH-7/7A EC-3. In 1994-5, the maintainability of the in-service units became critical.

Variables in selecting the appropriate probe include:

- Maximum depth sounded
- Speed of launching vessel
- Resolution of the vertical distance between data points (ft)
- Depth accuracy

==== Biomass ====
Large schools of fish contain enough entrapped air to conceal the sea floor, or manmade underwater vehicles and structures. Fishfinders, developed for commercial and recreational fishing, are specialized sonars that can identify acoustic reflections between the surface and the bottom. Variations on commercial equipment are apt to be needed, especially in littoral areas rich in marine life.

==== Sea bottom measurement ====
Bottom and Subsurface Characterization

A variety of sensors can be used to characterise the sea bottom into, for example, mud, sand, and gravel. Active acoustic sensors are the most obvious, but there is potential information from gravimetric sensors, electro-optical and radar sensors for making inferences from the water surface, etc.

Relatively simple sonars such as echo sounders can be promoted to seafloor classification systems via add-on modules, converting echo parameters into sediment type. Different algorithms exist, but they are all based on changes in the energy or shape of the reflected sounder pings.

Side-scan sonars can be used to derive maps of the topography of an area by moving the sonar across it just above the bottom. Multibeam hull-mounted sonars are not as precise as a sensor near the bottom, but both can give reasonable three-dimensional visualization.

Another approach comes from greater signal processing of existing military sensors. The US Naval Research Laboratory demonstrated both seafloor characterization, as well as subsurface characteristics of the seafloor. Sensors used, in different demonstrations, included normal incidence beams from the AM/UQN-4 surface ship depth finder, and AN/BQN-17 submarine fathometer; backscatter from the Kongsberg EM-121 commercial multibeam sonar; AN/UQN-4 fathometers on mine countermeasures (MCM) ships, and the AN/AQS-20 mine-hunting system. These produced the "Bottom and Subsurface Characterization" graphic.

=== Weather effects on chemical, biological, and radiological weapon propagation ===
One of the improvements in the Fuchs 2 reconnaissance vehicle is adding onboard weather instrumentations, including data such as wind direction and speed; air and ground temperature; barometric pressure and humidity.

== Acoustic MASINT ==
This includes the collection of passive or active emitted or reflected sounds, pressure waves or vibrations in the atmosphere (ACOUSTINT) or in the water (ACINT) or conducted through the ground Going well back into the Middle Ages, military engineers would listen to the ground for sounds of telltale digging under fortifications.

In modern times, acoustic sensors were first used in the air, as with artillery ranging in World War I. Passive hydrophones were used by the World War I Allies against German submarines; the UC-3 was sunk with the aid of a hydrophone on 23 April 1916. Since submerged submarines cannot use radar, passive and active acoustic systems are their primary sensors. Especially for the passive sensors, the submarine acoustic sensor operators must have extensive libraries of acoustic signatures, to identify sources of sound.

In shallow water, there are sufficient challenges to conventional acoustic sensors that additional MASINT sensors may be required. Two major confounding factors are:

- Boundary interactions. The effects of the seafloor and the sea surface on acoustic systems in shallow water are highly complex, making range predictions difficult. Multi-path degradation affects the overall figure of merit and active classification. As a result, false target identifications are frequent.
- Practical limitations. Another key issue is the range dependence of shallow water propagation and reverberation. For example, shallow water limits the depth of towed sound detection arrays, thus increasing the possibility of the system's detecting its own noise. In addition, closer ship spacing increases the potential for mutual interference effects. It is believed that non-acoustic sensors, of magnetic, optical, bioluminescent, chemical, and hydrodynamic disturbances will be necessary for shallow-water naval operations.

=== Counterbattery and countersniper location and ranging ===
While now primarily of historical interest, one of the first applications of acoustic and optical MASINT was locating enemy artillery by the sound of their firing and flashes respectively during World War I. Effective sound ranging was pioneered by the British Army under the leadership of the Nobel Lauriate William Bragg. Flash spotting developed in parallel in the British, French and German armies. The combination of sound ranging (i.e., acoustic MASINT) and flash ranging (i.e., before modern optoelectronics) gave information unprecedented for the time, in both accuracy and timeliness. Enemy gun positions were located within 25 to 100 yards, with the information coming in three minutes or less.

==== Initial WWI counterbattery acoustic systems ====
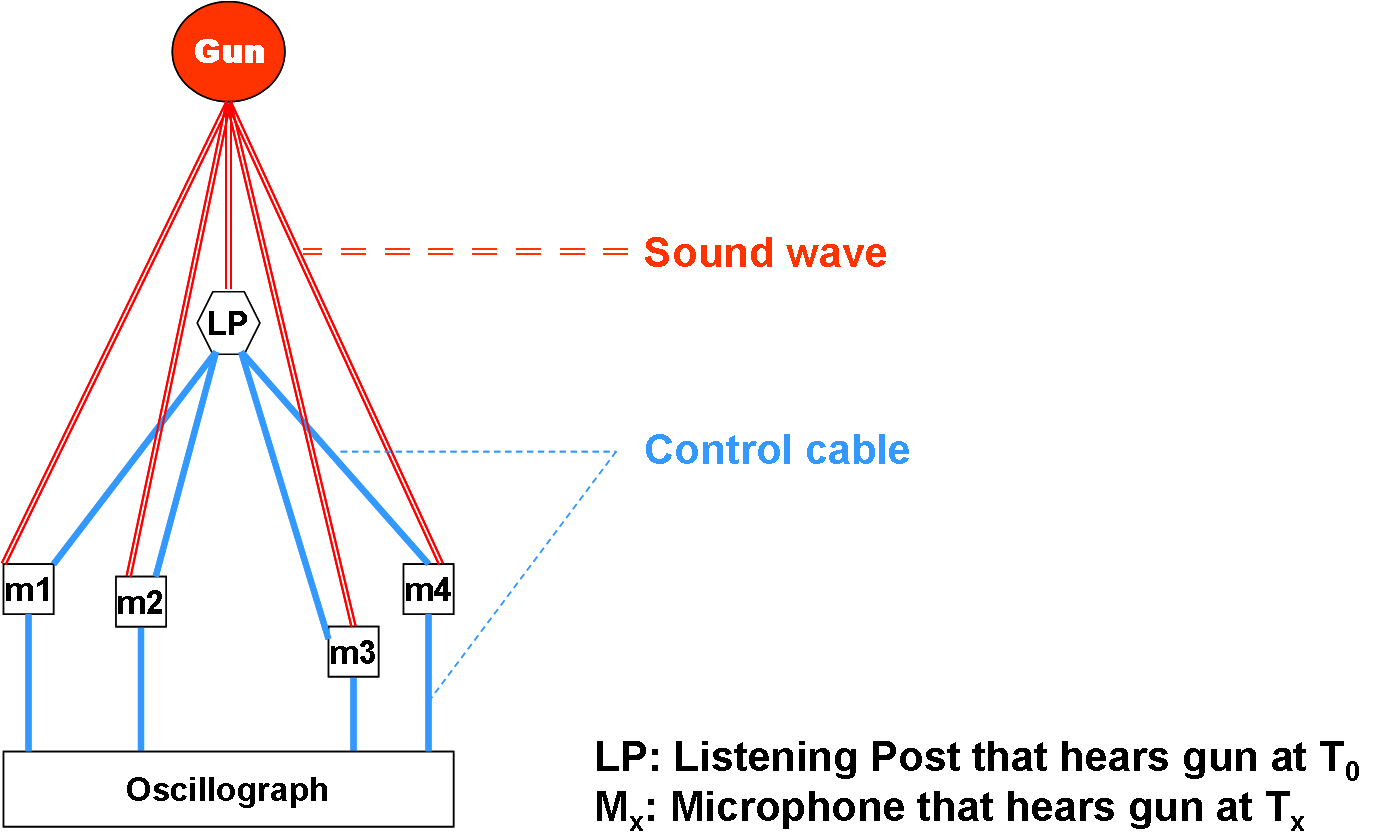
Sound Ranging

In the "Sound Ranging" graphic, the manned Listening (or Advanced) Post, is sited a few 'sound seconds (or about 2000 yards) forward of the line of the unattended microphones, it sends an electrical signal to the recording station to switch on the recording apparatus. The positions of the microphones are precisely known. The differences in sound time of arrival, taken from the recordings, were then used to plot the source of the sound by one of several techniques. See http://nigelef.tripod.com/p_artyint-cb.htm#SoundRanging

Where sound ranging is a time-of-arrival technique not dissimilar to that of modern multistatic sensors, flash spotting used optical instruments to take bearings on the flash from accurately surveyed observation posts. The location of the gun was determined by plotting the bearings reported to the same gun flashes. See http://nigelef.tripod.com/p_artyint-cb.htm#FieldSurveyCoy Flash ranging, today, would be called electro-optical MASINT.

Artillery sound and flash ranging remained in use through World War II and in its latest forms until the present day, although flash spotting generally ceased in the 1950s due to the widespread adoption of flashless propellants and the increasing range of artillery. Mobile counterbattery radars able to detect guns, itself a MASINT radar sensor, became available in the late 1970s, although counter-mortar radars appeared in World War II. These techniques paralleled radio direction finding in SIGINT that started in World War I, using graphical bearing plotting and now, with the precision time synchronization from GPS, is often time-of-arrival.

==== Modern acoustic artillery locators ====
Artillery positions now are located primarily with Unmanned Air Systems and IMINT or counterartillery radar, such as the widely used Swedish ArtHuR. SIGINT also may give clues to positions, both with COMINT for firing orders, and ELINT for such things as weather radar. Still, there is renewed interest in both acoustic and electro-optical systems to complement counter-artillery radar.

Acoustic sensors have come a long way since World War I. Typically, the acoustic sensor is part of a combined system, in which it cues radar or electro-optical sensors of greater precision, but a narrower field of view.

===== HALO =====
The UK's hostile artillery locating system (HALO) has been in service with the British Army since the 1990s. HALO is not as precise as radar, but especially complements directional radars. It passively detects artillery cannons, mortars and tank guns, with 360-degree coverage and can monitor over 2,000 square kilometers. HALO has worked in urban areas, the mountains of the Balkans, and the deserts of Iraq.

The system consists of three or more unmanned sensor positions, each with four microphones and local processing, these deduce the bearing to a gun, mortar, etc. These bearings are automatically communicated to a central processor that combines them to triangulate the source of the sound. It can compute location data on up to 8 rounds per second, and display the data to the system operator. HALO may be used in conjunction with COBRA and ArtHur counter-battery radars, which are not omnidirectional, to focus on the correct sector.

===== UTAMS =====
Another acoustic system is the Unattended Transient Acoustic MASINT Sensor (UTAMS), developed by the U.S. Army Research Laboratory, which detects mortar and rocket launches and impacts. UTAMS remains the primary cueing sensor for the Persistent Threat Detection System (PTDS). ARL mounted aerostats with UTAMS, developing the system in a little over two months. After receiving a direct request from Iraq, ARL merged components from several programs to enable the rapid fielding of this capability.

UTAMS has three to five acoustic arrays, each with four microphones, a processor, a radio link, a power source, and a laptop control computer. UTAMS, which was first operational in Iraq, first tested in November 2004 at a Special Forces Operating Base (SFOB) in Iraq. UTAMS was used in conjunction with AN/TPQ-36 and AN/TPQ-37 counter-artillery radar. While UTAMS was intended principally for detecting indirect artillery fire, Special Forces and their fire support officer learned it could pinpoint improvised explosive device (IED) explosions and small arms/rocket-propelled grenade (RPG) fires. It detected Points of Origin (POO) up to 10 kilometers from the sensor.

Analyzing the UTAMS and radar logs revealed several patterns. The opposing force was firing 60 mm mortars during observed dining hours, presumably since that gave the largest groupings of personnel and the best chance of producing heavy casualties. That would have been obvious from the impact history alone, but these MASINT sensors established a pattern of the enemy firing locations.

This allowed the US forces to move mortars into range of the firing positions, give coordinates to cannons when the mortars were otherwise committed, and use attack helicopters as a backup to both. The opponents changed to night fires, which, again, were countered with mortar, artillery, and helicopter fires. They then moved into an urban area where US artillery was not allowed to fire, but a combination of PSYOPS leaflet drops and deliberate near misses convinced the locals not to give sanctuary to the mortar crews.

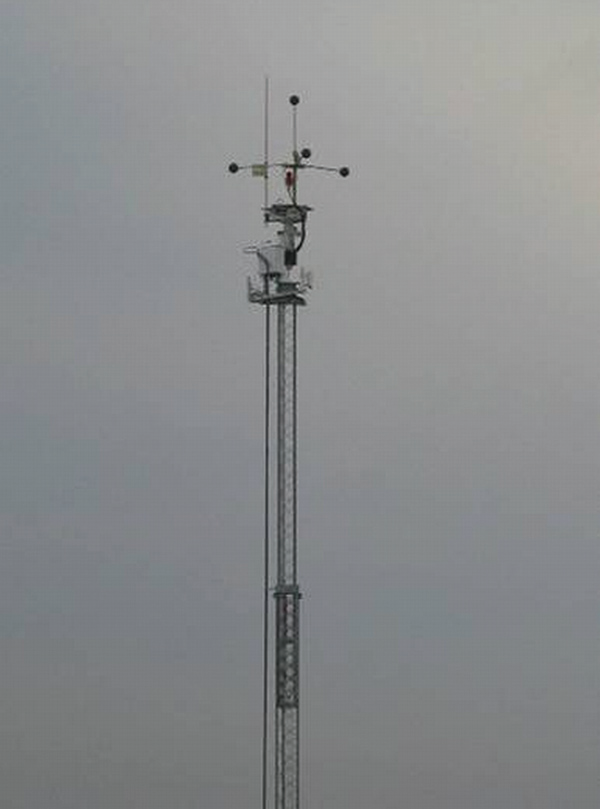
Tower-mounted UTAMS array component of UTAMS in the Rocket Launch Spotter (RLS) system

Originally for a Marine requirement in Afghanistan, UTAMS was combined with electro-optical MASINT to produce the Rocket Launch Spotter (RLS) system useful against both rockets and mortars.

In the Rocket Launch Spotter (RLS) application, each array consists of four microphones and processing equipment. Analyzing the time delays between an acoustic wavefront's interaction with each microphone in the array UTAMS provides an azimuth of origin. The azimuth from each tower is reported to the UTAMS processor at the control station, and a POO is triangulated and displayed. The UTAMS subsystem can also detect and locate the point of impact (POI), but, due to the difference between the speeds of sound and light, it may take UTAMS as long as 30 seconds to determine the POO for a rocket launch 13 km away. In this application, the electro-optical component of RLS will detect the rocket POO earlier, while UTAMS may do better with the mortar prediction.

=== Passive sea-based acoustic sensors (hydrophones) ===
Modern hydrophones convert sound to electrical energy, which then can undergo additional signal processing, or can be transmitted immediately to a receiving station. They may be directional or omnidirectional.

Navies use a variety of acoustic systems, especially passive, in antisubmarine warfare, both tactical and strategic. For tactical use, passive hydrophones, both on ships and airdropped sonobuoys, are used extensively in antisubmarine warfare. They can detect targets far further away than with active sonar, but generally will not have the precision location of active sonar, approximating it with a technique called Target Motion Analysis (TMA). Passive sonar has the advantage of not revealing the position of the sensor.

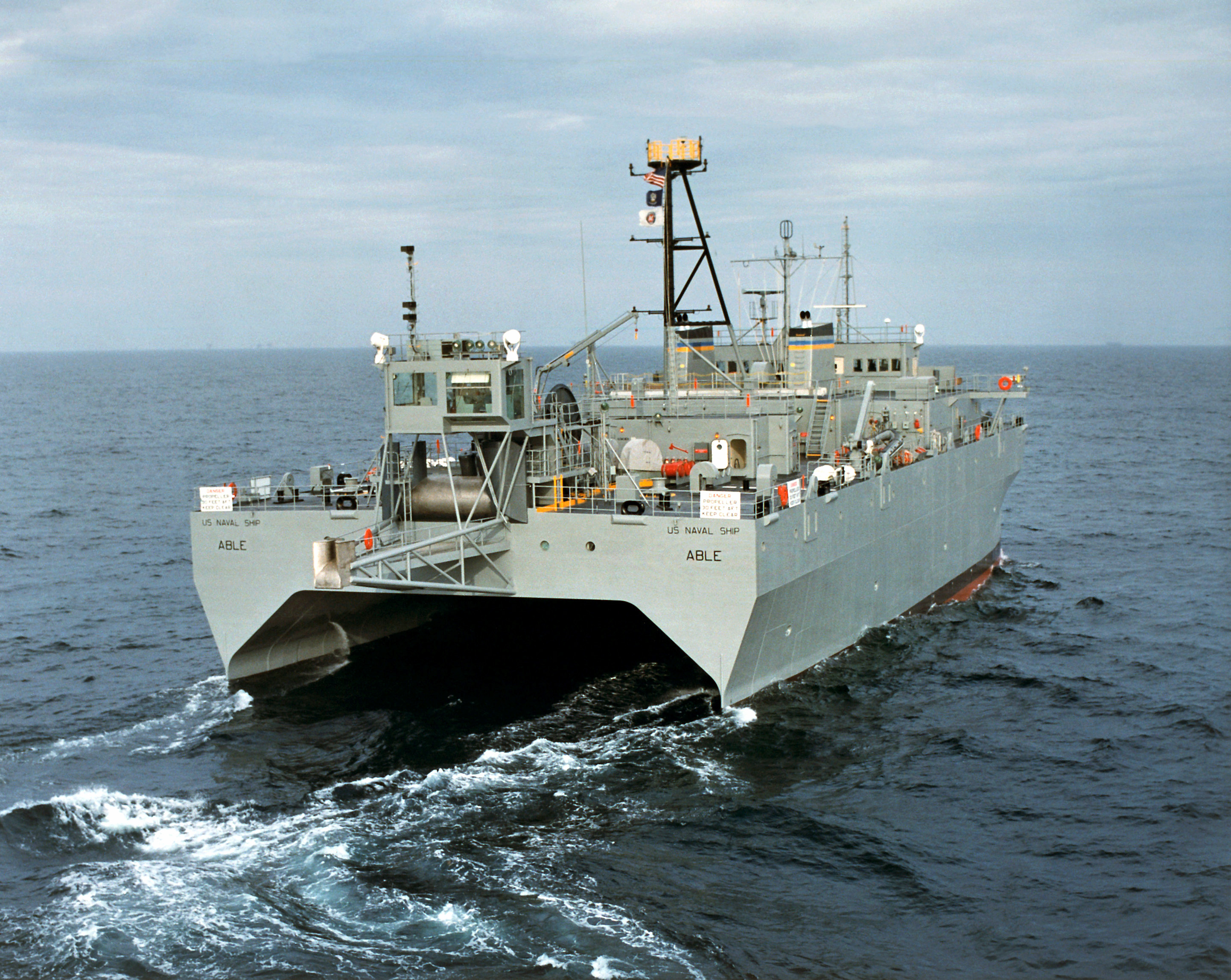
USNS Able (T-AGOS-20) aft view of SURTASS equipment.

The Integrated Undersea Surveillance System (IUSS) consists of multiple subsystems in SOSUS, Fixed Distributed System (FDS), and the Advanced Deployable System (ADS or SURTASS). Reducing the emphasis on Cold War blue-water operations put SOSUS, with more flexible "tuna boat" sensing vessels called SURTASS being the primary blue-water long-range sensors SURTASS used longer, more sensitive towed passive acoustic arrays than could be deployed from maneuvering vessels, such as submarines and destroyers.

SURTASS is now being complemented by Low-Frequency Active (LFA) sonar; see the sonar section.

==== Air-dropped passive acoustic sensors ====
Passive sonobuoys, such as the AN/SSQ-53F, can be directional or omnidirectional and can be set to sink to a specific depth. These would be dropped from helicopters and maritime patrol aircraft such as the P-3.

==== Fixed underwater passive acoustic sensors ====
The US installed massive Fixed Surveillance System (FSS, also known as SOSUS) hydrophone arrays on the ocean floor, to track Soviet and other submarines.

==== Surface ship passive acoustic sensors ====
Purely from the standpoint of detection, towed hydrophone arrays offer a long baseline and exceptional measurement capability. Towed arrays, however, are not always feasible, because when deployed, their performance can suffer, or they can suffer outright damage, from fast speeds or radical turns.

Steerable sonar arrays on the hull or bow usually have a passive as well as active mode, as do variable-depth sonars

Surface ships may have warning receivers to detect hostile sonar.

==== Submarine passive acoustic sensors ====
Modern submarines have multiple passive hydrophone systems, such as a steerable array in a bow dome, fixed sensors along the sides of the submarines, and towed arrays. They also have specialized acoustic receivers, analogous to radar warning receivers, to alert the crew to the use of active sonar against their submarine.

US submarines made extensive clandestine patrols to measure the signatures of Soviet submarines and surface vessels. This acoustic MASINT mission included both routine patrols of attack submarines, and submarines sent to capture the signature of a specific vessel. US antisubmarine technicians on air, surface, and subsurface platforms had extensive libraries of vessel acoustic signatures.

Passive acoustic sensors can detect aircraft flying low over the sea.

=== Land-based passive acoustic sensors (geophones) ===
Vietnam-era acoustic MASINT sensors included "Acoubuoy (36 inches long, 26 pounds) floated down by camouflaged parachute and caught in the trees, where it hung to listen. The Spikebuoy (66 inches long, 40 pounds) planted itself in the ground like a lawn dart. Only the antenna, which looked like the stalks of weeds, was left showing above ground." This was part of Operation Igloo White.

Part of the AN/GSQ-187 Improved Remote Battlefield Sensor System (I-REMBASS) is a passive acoustic sensor, which, with other MASINT sensors, detects vehicles and personnel on a battlefield. Passive acoustic sensors provide additional measurements that can be compared with signatures, and used to complement other sensors. I-REMBASS control will integrate, in approximately 2008, with the Prophet SIGINT/EW ground system.

For example, a ground search radar may not be able to differentiate between a tank and a truck moving at the same speed. Adding acoustic information, however, may quickly distinguish between them.

=== Active acoustic sensors and supporting measurements ===
Combatant vessels, of course, made extensive use of active sonar, which is yet another acoustic MASINT sensor. Besides the obvious application in antisubmarine warfare, specialized active acoustic systems have roles in:

- Mapping the seafloor for navigation and collision avoidance. These include basic depth gauges, but quickly get into devices that do 3-dimensional underwater mapping
- Determining seafloor characteristics, for applications varying from understanding its sound-reflecting properties, to predicting the type of marine life that may be found there, to knowing when a surface is appropriate for anchoring or for using various equipment that will contact the seafloor

Various synthetic aperture sonars have been built in the laboratory and some have entered use in mine-hunting and search systems. An explanation of their operation is given in synthetic aperture sonar.

==== Water surface, fish interference and bottom characterization ====
The water surface and bottom are reflecting and scattering boundaries. Large schools of fish, with air in their swim bladder balance apparatus, can also have a significant effect on acoustic propagation.

For many purposes, but not all naval tactical applications, the sea-air surface can be thought of as a perfect reflector. "The effects of the seafloor and the sea surface on acoustic systems in shallow water are highly complex, making range predictions difficult. Multi-path degradation affects the overall figure of merit and active classification. As a result, false target identifications are frequent."

The acoustic impedance mismatch between water and the bottom is generally much less than at the surface and is more complex. It depends on the bottom material types and the depth of the layers. Theories have been developed for predicting the sound propagation in the bottom in this case, for example by Biot and by Buckingham.

===== Water surface =====
For high-frequency sonars (above about 1 kHz) or when the sea is rough, some of the incident sounds is scattered, and this is taken into account by assigning a reflection coefficient whose magnitude is less than one.

Rather than measuring surface effects directly from a ship, radar MASINT, in aircraft or satellites, may give better measurements. These measurements would then be transmitted to the vessel's acoustic signal processor.

===== Under ice =====
A surface covered with ice, of course, is tremendously different than even storm-driven water Purely from collision avoidance and acoustic propagation, a submarine needs to know how close it is to the bottom of the ice. Less obvious is the need to know the three-dimensional structure of the ice, because submarines may need to break through it to launch missiles, raise electronic masts, or surface the boat. Three-dimensional ice information also can tell the submarine captain whether antisubmarine warfare aircraft can detect or attack the boat.

The state of the art is providing the submarine with a three-dimensional visualization of the ice above: the lowest part (ice keel) and the ice canopy. While sound will propagate differently in ice than in liquid water, the ice still needs to be considered as a volume, to understand the nature of reverberations within it.

===== Bottom =====
Diagram of sidescan sonar with towed probe, higher performance than multibeam ship-mounted but comparable

A typical basic depth measuring device is the US AN/UQN-4A. Both the water surface and bottom are reflecting and scattering boundaries. For many purposes, but not all naval tactical applications, the sea-air surface can be thought of as a perfect reflector. In reality, there are complex interactions of water surface activity, seafloor characteristics, water temperature and salinity, and other factors that make "...range predictions difficult. Multi-path degradation affects overall figure of merit and active classification. As a result, false target identifications are frequent."

This device, however, does not give information on the characteristics of the bottom. In many respects, commercial fishing and marine scientists have equipment that is perceived as needed for shallow-water operations.

===== Biologic effects on sonar reflection =====
A further complication is the presence of wind-generated bubbles or fish close to the sea surface. . The bubbles can also form plumes that absorb some of the incidents and scattered sound, and scatter some of sound themselves. .

This problem is distinct from biologic interference caused by acoustic energy generated by marine life, such as the squeaks of porpoises and other cetaceans, and measured by acoustic receivers. The signatures of biological sound generators need to be differentiated from more deadly denizens of the depths. Classifying biologics is a very good example of an acoustic MASINT process.

==== Surface combatants ====
Modern surface combatants with an ASW mission will have a variety of active systems, with a hull- or bow-mounted array, protected from water by a rubber dome; a "variable-depth" dipping sonar on a cable, and, especially on smaller vessels, a fixed acoustic generator and receiver.

Some, but not all, vessels carry passive towed arrays or combined active-passive arrays. These depend on target noise, which, in the combined littoral environment of ultraquiet submarines in the presence of much ambient noise. Vessels that have deployed towed arrays cannot make radical course maneuvers. Especially when active capabilities are included, the array can be treated as a bistatic or multistatic sensor, and act as a synthetic aperture sonar (SAS)

For ships that cooperate with aircraft, they will need a data link to sonobuoys and a sonobuoy signal processor, unless the aircraft has extensive processing capability and can send information that can be accepted directly by tactical computers and displays.

Signal processors not only analyze the signals but constantly track propagation conditions. The former is usually considered part of a particular sonar, but the US Navy has a separate propagation predictor called the AN/UYQ-25B(V) Sonar in situ Mode Assessment System (SIMAS)

Echo Tracker Classifiers (ETC) are adjuncts, with a clear MASINT flavor, to existing surface ship sonars. ETC is an application of synthetic aperture sonar (SAS). SAS is already used for minehunting but could help existing surface combatants, as well as future vessels and unmanned surface vehicles (USV), detect threats, such as very silent air-independent propulsion non-nuclear submarines, outside torpedo range. The torpedo range, especially in shallow water, is considered anything greater than 10 nmi.

Conventional active sonar may be more effective than towed arrays, but the small size of modern littoral submarines makes them difficult threats. Highly variable bottom paths, biologics, and other factors complicate sonar detection. If the target is slow-moving or waiting on the bottom, they have little or no Doppler effect, which current sonars use to recognize threats.

Continual active tracking measurement of all acoustically detected objects, with recognition of signatures as deviations from ambient noise, still gives a high false alarm rate (FAR) with conventional sonar. SAS processing, however, improves the resolution, especially of azimuth measurements, by assembling the data from multiple pings into a synthetic beam that gives the effect of a far larger receiver.

MASINT-oriented SAS measures shape characteristics and eliminate acoustically detected objects that do not conform to the signature of threats. Shape recognition is only one of the parts of the signature, which include course and Doppler when available.

==== Air-dropped active sonobuoys ====
Active sonobuoys, containing a sonar transmitter and receiver, can be dropped from fixed-wing maritime patrol aircraft (e.g., P-3, Nimrod, Chinese Y-8, Russian and Indian Bear ASW variants), antisubmarine helicopters, and carrier-based antisubmarine aircraft (e.g., S-3). While there have been some efforts to use other aircraft simply as carriers of sonobuoys, the general assumption is that the sonobuoy-carrying aircraft can issue commands to the sonobuoys and receive, and to some extent process, their signals.

The Directional Hydrophone Command Activated Sonobuoy system (DICASS) both generates sound and listen for it. A typical modern active sonobuoy, such as the AN/SSQ 963D, generates multiple acoustic frequencies . Other active sonobuoys, such as the AN/SSQ 110B, generate small explosions as acoustic energy sources.

==== Airborne dipping sonar ====
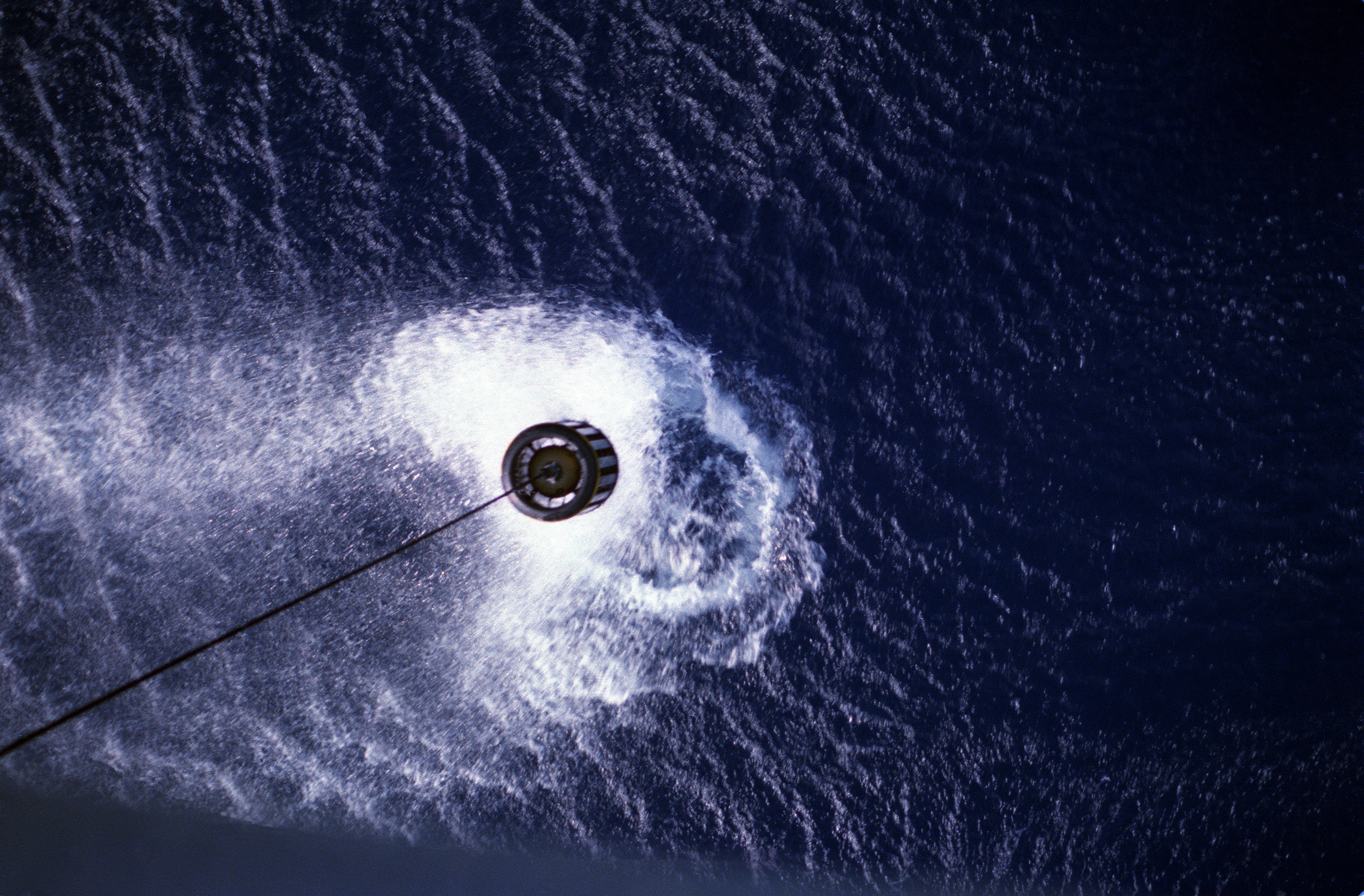
AN/AQS-13 Dipping sonar deployed from an H-3 Sea King, an aircraft used by numerous countries and produced in Italy, Japan, and the United Kingdom

Antisubmarine helicopters can carry a "dipping" sonar head at the end of a cable, which the helicopter can raise from or lower into the water. The helicopter would typically dip the sonar when trying to localize a target submarine, usually in cooperation with other ASW platforms or with sonobuoys. Typically, the helicopter would raise its head after dropping an ASW weapon, to avoid damaging the sensitive receiver. Not all variants of the same basic helicopter, even assigned to ASW, carry dipping sonar; some may trade the weight of the sonar for more sonobuoy or weapon capacity.

The EH101 helicopter, used by a number of nations, has a variety of dipping sonars. The (British) Royal Navy version has Ferranti/Thomson-CSF (now Thales) sonar, while the Italian version uses the HELRAS. Russian Ka-25 helicopters carry dipping sonar, as does the US LAMPS, US MH-60R helicopter, which carries the Thales AQS-22 dipping sonar. The older SH-60F helicopter carries the AQS-13F dipping sonar.

==== Surveillance vessel low-frequency active ====
Newer Low-Frequency Active (LFA) systems are controversial, as their very high sound pressures may be hazardous to whales and other marine life . A decision has been made to employ LFA on SURTASS vessels, after an environmental impact statement that indicated, if LFA is used with decreased power levels in certain high-risk areas for marine life, it would be safe when employed from a moving ship. The ship motion, and the variability of the LFA signal, would limit the exposure to individual sea animals. LFA operates in the low-frequency (LF) acoustic band of 100–500 Hz. It has an active component, the LFA proper, and the passive SURTASS hydrophone array. "The active component of the system, LFA, is a set of 18 LF acoustic transmitting source elements (called projectors) suspended by cable from underneath an oceanographic surveillance vessel, such as the Research Vessel (R/V) Cory Chouest, USNS Impeccable (T-AGOS 23), and the Victorious class (TAGOS 19 class).

"The source level of an individual projector is 215 dB. These projectors produce the active sonar signal or "ping". A "ping", or transmission, can last between 6 and 100 seconds. The time between transmissions is typically 6 to 15 minutes with an average transmission of 60 seconds. Average duty cycle (ratio of sound "on" time to total time) is less than 20 percent. The typical duty cycle, based on historical LFA operational parameters (2003 to 2007), is normally 7.5 to 10 percent."

This signal "...is not a continuous tone, but rather a transmission of waveforms that vary in frequency and duration. The duration of each continuous frequency sound transmission is normally 10 seconds or less. The signals are loud at the source, but levels diminish rapidly over the first kilometer."

==== Submarine active acoustic sensors ====
The primary tactical active sonar of a submarine is usually in the bow, covered with a protective dome. Submarines for blue-water operations used active systems such as the AN/SQS-26 and AN/SQS-53 have been developed but were generally designed for convergence zone and single bottom bounce environments.

Submarines that operate in the Arctic also have specialized sonar for under-ice operation; think of an upside-down fathometer.

Submarines also may have minehunting sonar. Using measurements to differentiate between biologic signatures and signatures of objects that will permanently sink the submarine is as critical a MASINT application as could be imagined.

==== Active acoustic sensors for minehunting ====
Sonars optimized to detect objects of the size and shapes of mines can be carried by submarines, remotely operated vehicles, surface vessels (often on a boom or cable) and specialized helicopters.

The classic emphasis on minesweeping, and detonating the mine released from its tether using gunfire, has been replaced with the AN/SLQ-48(V)2 mine neutralization system (MNS)AN/SLQ-48 - (remotely operated) Mine Neutralization Vehicle. This works well for rendering save mines in deep water, by placing explosive charges on the mine and/or its tether. The AN/SLQ-48 is not well suited to the neutralization of shallow-water mines. The vehicle tends to be underpowered and may leave on the bottom a mine that looks like a mine to any subsequent sonar search and an explosive charge subject to later detonation under proper impact conditions.

There is mine-hunting sonar, as well as an (electro-optical) television on the ROV, and AN/SQQ-32 minehunting sonar on the ship.

=== Acoustic sensing of large explosions ===
An assortment of time-synchronized sensors can characterize conventional or nuclear explosions. One pilot study, the Active Radio Interferometer for Explosion Surveillance (ARIES). This technique implements an operational system for monitoring ionospheric pressure waves resulting from surface or atmospheric nuclear or chemical explosives. Explosions produce pressure waves that can be detected by measuring phase variations between signals generated by ground stations along two different paths to a satellite. This is a very modernized version, on a larger scale, of World War I sound ranging.

As can many sensors, ARIES can be used for additional purposes. Collaborations are being pursued with the Space Forecast Center to use ARIES data for total electron content measures on a global scale, and with the meteorology/global environment community to monitor global climate change (via tropospheric water vapor content measurements), and by the general ionospheric physics community to study travelling ionospheric disturbances.

Sensors relatively close to a nuclear event, or a high-explosive test simulating a nuclear event, can detect, using acoustic methods, the pressure produced by the blast. These include infrasound microbarographs (acoustic pressure sensors) that detect very low-frequency sound waves in the atmosphere produced by natural and man-made events.

Closely related to the microbarographs, but detecting pressure waves in water, are hydro-acoustic sensors, both underwater microphones and specialized seismic sensors that detect the motion of islands.

== Seismic MASINT ==
US Army Field Manual 2-0 defines seismic intelligence as "The passive collection and measurement of seismic waves or vibrations in the earth surface." One strategic application of seismic intelligence makes use of the science of seismology to locate and characterize nuclear testing, especially underground testing. Seismic sensors also can characterize large conventional explosions that are used in testing the high-explosive components of nuclear weapons. Seismic intelligence also can help locate such things as large underground construction projects.

Since many areas of the world have a great deal of natural seismic activity, seismic MASINT is one of the emphatic arguments that there must be a long-term commitment to measuring, even during peacetime, so that the signatures of natural behavior is known before it is necessary to search for variations from signatures.

=== Strategic seismic MASINT ===
For nuclear test detection, seismic intelligence is limited by the "threshold principle" coined in 1960 by George Kistiakowsky, which recognized that while detection technology would continue to improve, there would be a threshold below which small explosions could not be detected.

=== Tactical seismic MASINT ===
The most common sensor in the Vietnam-era "McNamara Line" of remote sensors was the ADSID (Air-Delivered Seismic Intrusion Detector) sensed earth motion to detect people and vehicles. It resembled the Spikebuoy, except it was smaller and lighter (31 inches long, 25 pounds). The challenge for the seismic sensors (and for the analysts) was not so much in detecting the people and the trucks as it was in separating out the false alarms generated by wind, thunder, rain, earth tremors, and animals—especially frogs."

== Vibration MASINT ==
This subdiscipline is also called piezoelectric MASINT after the sensor most often used to sense vibration, but vibration detectors need not be piezoelectric. Note that some discussions treat seismic and vibration sensors as a subset of acoustic MASINT. Other possible detectors could be moving coil or surface acoustic wave. . Vibration, as a form of geophysical energy to be sensed, has similarities to acoustic and seismic MASINT, but also has distinct differences that make it useful, especially in unattended ground sensors (UGS). In the UGS application, one advantage of a piezoelectric sensor is that it generates electricity when triggered, rather than consuming electricity, an important consideration for remote sensors whose lifetime may be determined by their battery capacity.

While acoustic signals at sea travel through water, on land, they can be assumed to come through the air. Vibration, however, is conducted through a solid medium on land. It has a higher frequency than is typical of seismic conducted signals.

A typical detector, the Thales MA2772 vibration is a piezoelectric cable, shallowly buried below the ground surface, and extended for 750 meters. Two variants are available, a high-sensitivity version for personnel detection, and a lower-sensitivity version to detect vehicles. Using two or more sensors will determine the direction of travel, from the sequence in which the sensors trigger.

In addition to being buried, piezoelectric vibration detectors, in a cable form factor, also are used as part of high-security fencing. They can be embedded in walls or other structures that need protection.

== Magnetic MASINT ==
A magnetometer is a scientific instrument used to measure the strength and/or direction of the magnetic field in the vicinity of the instrument. The measurements they make can be compared to signatures of vehicles on land, submarines underwater, and atmospheric radio propagation conditions. They come in two basic types:

- Scalar magnetometers measure the total strength of the magnetic field to which they are subjected, and
- Vector magnetometers have the capability to measure the component of the magnetic field in a particular direction.

Earth's magnetism varies from place to place and differences in the Earth's magnetic field (the magnetosphere) can be caused by two things:

- The differing nature of rocks
- The interaction between charged particles from the sun and the magnetosphere

Metal detectors use electromagnetic induction to detect metal. They can also determine the changes in existing magnetic fields caused by metallic objects.

=== Indicating loops for detecting submarines ===
One of the first means for detecting submerged submarines, first installed by the Royal Navy in 1914, was the effect of their passage over an anti-submarine indicator loop on the bottom of a body of water. A metal object passing over it, such as a submarine, will, even if degaussed, have enough magnetic properties to induce a current in the loop's cable. . In this case, the motion of the metal submarine across the indicating coil acts as an oscillator, producing electric current.

=== MAD ===
A magnetic anomaly detector (MAD) is an instrument used to detect minute variations in the Earth's magnetic field. The term refers specifically to magnetometers used either by military forces to detect submarines (a mass of ferromagnetic material creates a detectable disturbance in the magnetic field)Magnetic anomaly detectors were first employed to detect submarines during World War II. MAD gear was used by both Japanese and U.S. anti-submarine forces, either towed by ship or mounted in aircraft to detect shallow submerged enemy submarines. After the war, the U.S. Navy continued to develop MAD gear as a parallel development with sonar detection technologies.

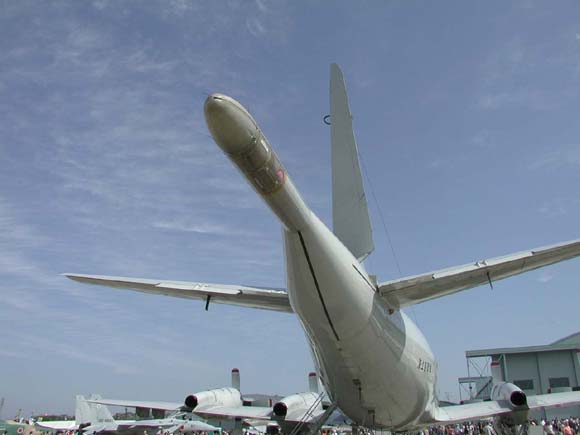
MAD rear boom on P-3C

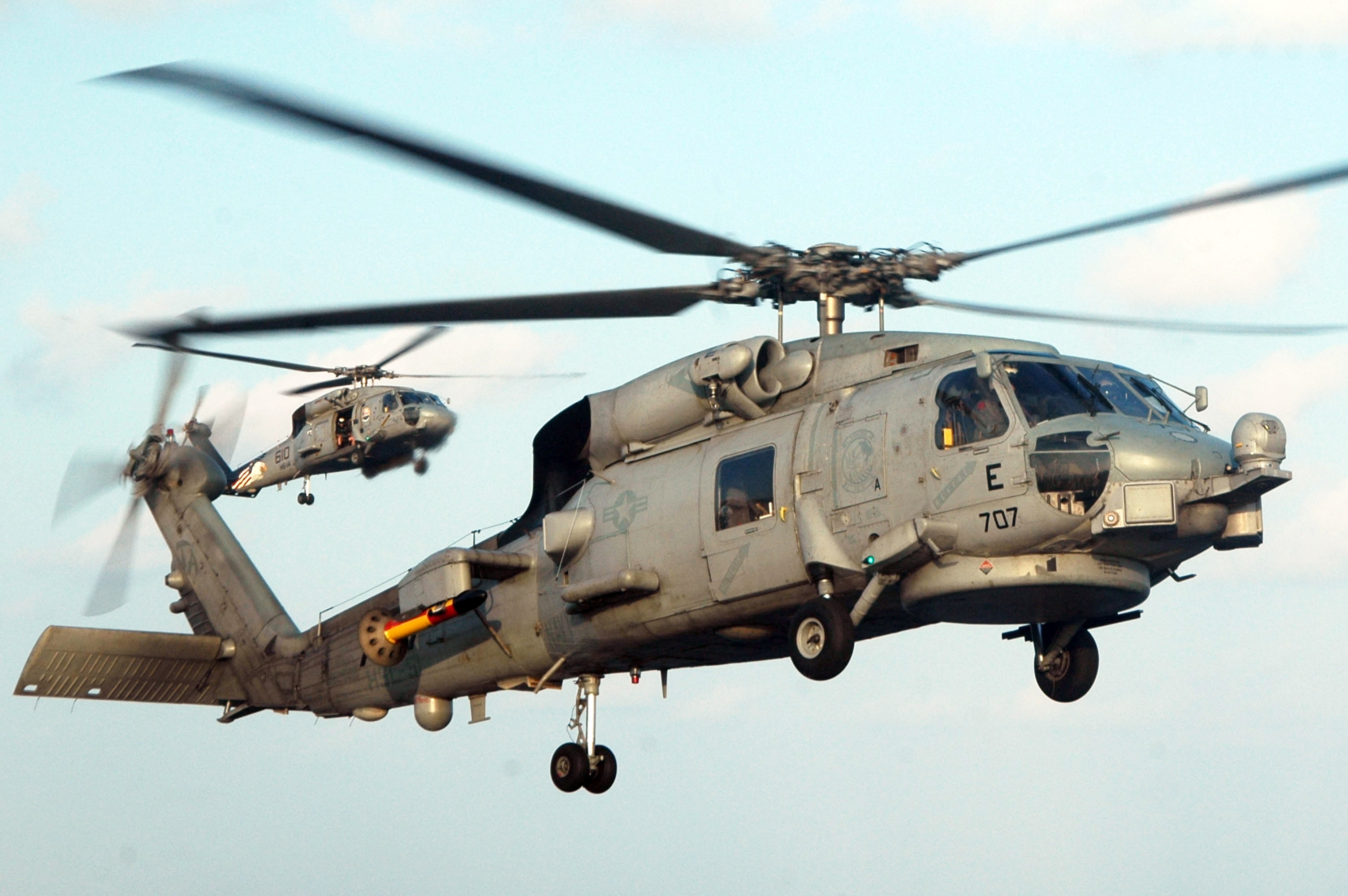
The SH-60B Seahawk helicopter carries an orange, towed MAD array known as a ‘MAD bird', seen on the aft fuselage.

To reduce interference from electrical equipment or metal in the fuselage of the aircraft, the MAD sensor is placed at the end of a boom or a towed aerodynamic device. Even so, the submarine must be very near the aircraft's position and close to the sea surface for detection of the change or anomaly. The detection range is normally related to the distance between the sensor and the submarine. The size of the submarine and its hull composition determine the detection range. MAD devices are usually mounted on aircraft or helicopters.

There is some misunderstanding of the mechanism of detection of submarines in water using the MAD boom system. Magnetic moment displacement is ostensibly the main disturbance, yet submarines are detectable even when oriented parallel to the Earth's magnetic field, despite construction with non-ferromagnetic hulls.

For example, the Soviet-Russian Alfa class submarine, was constructed out of titanium. This light, strong material, as well as a unique nuclear power system, allowed the submarine to break speed and depth records for operational boats. It was thought that nonferrous titanium would defeat magnetic ASW sensors, but this was not the case. to give dramatic submerged performance and protection from detection by MAD sensors, is still detectable.

Since titanium structures are detectable, MAD sensors do not directly detect deviations in the Earth's magnetic field. Instead, they may be described as long-range electric and electromagnetic field detector arrays of great sensitivity.

An electric field is set up in conductors experiencing a variation in physical environmental conditions, providing that they are contiguous and possess sufficient mass. Particularly in submarine hulls, there is a measurable temperature difference between the bottom and top of the hull producing a related salinity difference, as salinity is affected by the temperature of the water. The difference in salinity creates an electric potential across the hull. An electric current then flows through the hull, between the laminae of sea water separated by depth and temperature. The resulting dynamic electric field produces an electromagnetic field of its own, and thus even a titanium hull will be detectable on a MAD scope, as will a surface ship for the same reason.

=== Vehicle detectors ===
The Remotely Emplaced Battlefield Surveillance System (REMBASS) is a US Army program for detecting the presence, speed, and direction of a ferrous object, such as a tank. Coupled with acoustic sensors that recognize the sound signature of a tank, it could offer high accuracy. It also collects weather information.

The Army's AN/GSQ-187 Improved Remote Battlefield Sensor System (I-REMBASS) includes both magnetic-only and combined passive infrared/magnetic intrusion detectors. The DT-561/GSQ hand emplaced MAG "sensor detects vehicles (tracked or wheeled) and personnel carrying ferrous metal. It also provides information on which to base a count of objects passing through its detection zone and reports their direction of travel relative to their location. The monitor uses two different (MAG and IR) sensors and their identification codes to determine the direction of travel.

=== Magnetic detonators and countermeasures ===
Magnetic sensors, much more sophisticated than the early inductive loops, can trigger the explosion of mines or torpedoes. Early in World War II, the US tried to put a magnetic torpedo exploder far beyond the limits of the technology of the time and had to disable it, and then work on also-unreliable contact fuzing, to make torpedoes more than blunt objects than banged into hulls.

Since water is incompressible, an explosion under the keel of a vessel is far more destructive than one at the air-water interface. Torpedo and mine designers want to place the explosions in that vulnerable spot, and countermeasures designers want to hide the magnetic signature of a vessel. Signature is especially relevant here, as mines may be made selective for warships, merchant vessels unlikely to be hardened against underwater explosions, or submarines.

A basic countermeasure, started in World War II, was degaussing, but it is impossible to remove all magnetic properties.

=== Detecting landmines ===
Landmines often contain enough ferrous metal to be detectable with appropriate magnetic sensors. Sophisticated mines, however, may also sense a metal-detection oscillator, and, under preprogrammed conditions, detonate to deter demining personnel.

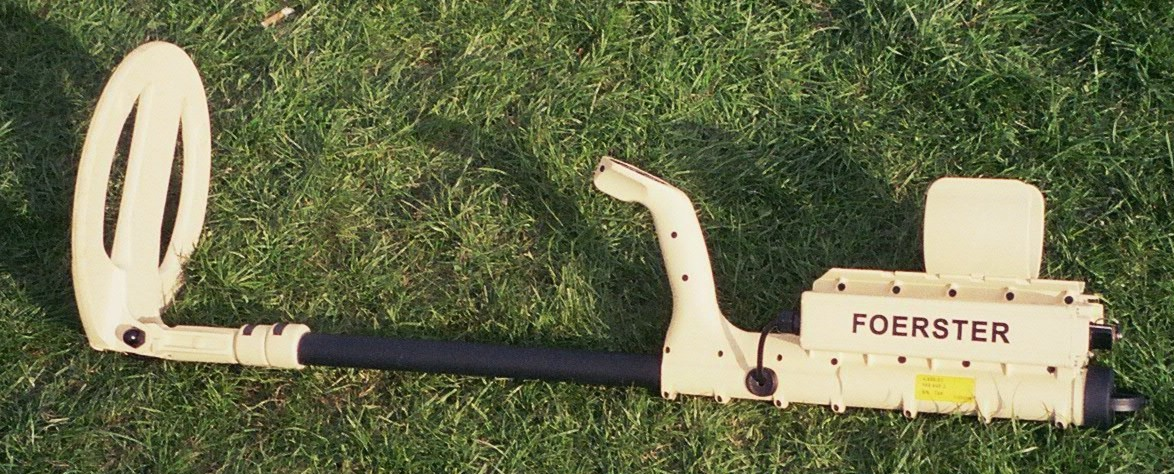
Foerster Minex 2FD 4.500 Metal detector used by the French army

Not all landmines have enough metal to activate a magnetic detector. While the greatest number of unmapped minefields are in parts of the world that cannot afford high technology, a variety of MASINT sensors could help demining. These would include ground-mapping radar, thermal and multispectral imaging, and perhaps synthetic aperture radar to detect disturbed soil.

== Gravitimetric MASINT ==
Gravity is a function of mass. While the average value of Earth's surface gravity is approximately 9.8 meters per second squared, given sufficiently sensitive instrumentation, it is possible to detect local variations in gravity from the different densities of natural materials: the value of gravity will be greater on top of a granite monolith than over a sand beach. Again with sufficiently sensitive instrumentation, it should be possible to detect gravitational differences between solid rock, and rock excavated for a hidden facility.

Streland 2003 points out that the instrumentation indeed must be sensitive: variations of the force of gravity on the earth's surface are on the order of 10^{6} of the average value. A practical gravimetric detector of buried facilities would need to be able to measure "less than one one millionth of the force that caused the apple to fall on Sir Isaac Newton's head." To be practical, it would be necessary for the sensor to be able to be used while in motion, measuring the change in gravity between locations. This change over distance is called the gravity gradient, which can be measured with a gravity gradiometer.

Developing an operationally useful gravity gradiometer is a major technical challenge. One type, the SQUID Superconducting Quantum Interference Device gradiometer, may have adequate sensitivity, but it needs extreme cryogenic cooling, even if in space, a logistic nightmare. Another technique, far more operationally practical but lacking the necessary sensitivity, is the Gravity Recovery and Climate Experiment (GRACE) technique, currently using radar to measure the distance between pairs of satellites, whose orbits will change based on gravity. Substituting lasers for radar will make GRACE more sensitive, but probably not sensitive enough.

A more promising technique, although still in the laboratory, is quantum gradiometry, which is an extension of atomic clock techniques, much like those in GPS. Off-the-shelf atomic clocks measure changes in atomic waves over time rather than the spatial changes measured in a quantum gravity gradiometer. One advantage of using GRACE in satellites is that measurements can be made from a number of points over time, with a resulting improvement as seen in synthetic aperture radar and sonar. Still, finding deeply buried structures of human scale is a tougher problem than the initial goals of finding mineral deposits and ocean currents.

To make this operationally feasible, there would have to be a launcher to put fairly heavy satellites into polar orbits, and as many earth stations as possible to reduce the need for large on-board storage of the large amounts of data the sensors will produce. Finally, there needs to be a way to convert the measurements into a form that can be compared against available signatures in geodetic databases. Those databases would need significant improvement, from measured data, to become sufficiently precise that a buried facility signature would stand out.
