= Nuclear MASINT =

Nuclear intelligence subdiscipline

Intelligence cycle management
Intelligence collection management
MASINT
- Electro-optical MASINT
- Nuclear MASINT
- Geophysical MASINT
- Radar MASINT
- Materials MASINT
- Radiofrequency MASINT

Nuclear MASINT is one of the six major subdisciplines generally accepted to make up measurement and signature intelligence (MASINT), which covers measurement and characterization of information derived from nuclear radiation and other physical phenomena associated with nuclear weapons, reactors, processes, materials, devices, and facilities. Nuclear monitoring can be done remotely or during onsite inspections of nuclear facilities. Data exploitation results in characterization of nuclear weapons, reactors, and materials. A number of systems detect and monitor the world for nuclear explosions, as well as nuclear materials production.

According to the United States Department of Defense, MASINT is technically derived intelligence (excluding traditional imagery IMINT and signals intelligence SIGINT) that – when collected, processed, and analyzed by dedicated MASINT systems – results in intelligence that detects, tracks, identifies, or describes the signatures (distinctive characteristics) of fixed or dynamic target sources. MASINT was recognized as a formal intelligence discipline in 1986. Materials intelligence is one of the major MASINT disciplines.

As with most MASINT subdisciplines, nuclear MASINT overlaps with others. Radiation survey, under Nuclear MASINT, is an area operation, or will measure the effects on specific people or things. Nuclear test analysis, on the other hand, focuses on the field or reference laboratory analysis of samples from air sampling, contaminated sites, etc.

As with many branches of MASINT, specific techniques may overlap with the six major conceptual disciplines of MASINT defined by the Center for MASINT Studies and Research, which divides MASINT into Electro-optical, Nuclear, Geophysical, Radar, Materials, and Radiofrequency disciplines.

In particular, there is a narrow line between nuclear MASINT and the nuclear analysis techniques in materials MASINT. The basic difference is that nuclear MASINT deals with the characteristics of real-time nuclear events, such as nuclear explosions, radioactive clouds from accidents or terrorism, and other types of radiation events. A materials MASINT analyst looking at the same phenomenon, however, will have a more micro-level view, doing such things as analyzing fallout particles from air sampling, ground contamination, or radioactive gases released into the atmosphere.

Some nuclear MASINT techniques are placed fairly arbitrarily into this subdiscipline. For example, measurement of the brightness and opacity of a cloud from a nuclear explosion is usually considered nuclear MASINT, but the techniques used to measure those parameters are electro-optical. The arbitrary distinction here considers nuclear MASINT a more specific description than electro-optical MASINT.

== Radiation survey and dosimetry ==
In nuclear war, after nuclear weapons accidents, and with the contemporary threat of "dirty bomb" radiological warfare, measuring the intensity of high-intensity ionizing radiation, and the cumulative dose received by personnel, is critical safety information.[3]

The survey function measures the type of active ionizing radiation present from:

- Alpha particles
- beta particles
- neutrons
- X-rays
- Gamma rays

While alpha particle emitters such as those in depleted uranium (DU) (i.e., uranium 238) are not a hazard at a distance, alpha particle measurements are necessary for safe handling of projectile dust, or of damaged vehicles with DU armor.

=== Survey of environments that can be monitored by humans ===
The basic field survey instrument that can detect alpha particles is a scintillometer, such as the AN/PDR-77, which "shall accept a maximum of eight different probes. Each probe is automatically recognized and has unique calibration information stored in non-volatile memory. The AN/PDR-77 comes with three probes. A 100cm2 Zinc Sulfur (ZnS) alpha probe, a two Geiger tube beta and/or gamma probe, and a 5-inch Sodium Iodide (NaI) low energy X-ray probe able to measure and find surface contamination levels of Plutonium and Americium (Am)-241 in μCi/m2. An accessory kit is available that contains a GM pancake probe and a 1” x 1.5” NaI micro-R probe.various removable shields to permit alpha and beta particles to reach the sensor."

Specialized instruments are used for tritium survey. Tritium levels are measured with the AN/PDR-73 or -74. A wide range of ionization chamber, film badge, and thermoluminescent personal dosimeters are available.

"Field survey of uranium is best accomplished by measuring X-rays in the 60 to 80 keV range emitted by uranium isotopes and daughters. For plutonium, the best technique is to detect the accompanying contaminant Am-241, which emits a strong 60 keV gamma ray. Knowing the original assay and the age of the weapon, the ratio of plutonium to americium may be computed accurately and so the total plutonium contamination may be determined. "Many of the factors that may not be controlled in a field environment may be managed in a mobile laboratory that may be brought to an accident site. Typically, the capabilities include gamma spectroscopy, low background counting for very thin alpha- and beta-emitting samples, and liquid scintillation counters for extremely low energy beta emitters such as tritium.

The DoD directive makes the distinction clear that detection is harder than measurement, and the latter is necessary for MASINT. "P5.2.2.1. Nuclear radiation is not easy to detect. Radiation detection is always a multistep, highly indirect process. For example, in a scintillation detector, incident radiation excites a fluorescent material that de-excites by emitting photons of light. The light is focused onto the photocathode of a photomultiplier tube that triggers an electron avalanche. The electron shower produces an electrical pulse that activates a meter read by the operator. Not surprisingly, the quantitative relationship between the amount of radiation actually emitted and the reading on the meter is a complex function of many factors. Since those factors may only be controlled well within a laboratory, only in a laboratory setting may true measurements be made." This can be a field laboratory.

Detectors based on semiconductors, notably hyperpure germanium, have better intrinsic energy resolution than scintillators, and are preferred where feasible for gamma-ray spectrometry. In the case of neutron detectors, high efficiency is gained through the use of scintillating materials rich in hydrogen that scatter neutrons efficiently. Liquid scintillation counters are an efficient and practical means of quantifying beta radiation

=== Surveying high-level radioactive areas ===
Some reactor accidents have left extremely high levels, such as at Chernobyl or the Idaho SL-1. In the case of Chernobyl, many rescue and mitigation workers, some knowingly and others unknowingly, suffered severe radiation exposure. The very careful cleanup of the SL-1, in a remote area and where the containment retained its integrity, minimized hazards.

Since those incidents and others, remotely operated or autonomous vehicle technology has improved.

=== Antineutrino detection and monitoring ===
A significant fraction of the energy generated by a nuclear reactor is lost in the form of extremely penetrating antineutrinos, with a signature revealing the kind of reactions inside. Thus, antineutrino detectors are being studied to locate and monitor them at a distance. Initially held back by a lack of spectrum data, in the early 2000s, with increased resolution, the process has been demonstrated in Canada and is suggested as possibly useful for remotely monitoring the proposed reactors within the Iran nuclear energy program. The multinational Daya Bay Reactor Neutrino Experiment in China is currently (as of 2016) the world's most important research facility in this field.

== Space-based nuclear energy detection ==
In 1959, the US started to experiment with space-based nuclear sensors, beginning with the VELA HOTEL satellites. These were originally intended to detect nuclear explosions in space, using X-ray, neutron and gamma-ray detectors. Advanced VELA satellites added electro-optical MASINT devices called bhangmeters, which could detect nuclear tests on earth by detecting a characteristic signature of nuclear bursts: a double light flash, with the flashes milliseconds apart. Using Radiofrequency MASINT sensors, satellites also could detect electromagnetic pulse (EMP) signatures from events on Earth.

Several more advanced satellites replaced the early VELAs, and the function exists today as the Integrated Operational Nuclear Detection System (IONDS), as an additional function on the NAVSTAR satellites used for GPS navigation information.

== Effects of ionizing radiation on materials ==
Beyond immediate biological effects, ionizing radiation has structural effects on materials.

=== Structural weakening ===
While nuclear reactors are usually in sturdy housings, it was not immediately realized that long-term neutron bombardment can embrittle steel. When, for example, ex-Soviet submarine reactors are not given full maintenance or decommissioning, there is a cumulative hazard that steel in the containment, or piping that can reach the core, might lose strength and break. Understanding those effects as a function of radiation type and density can help predict when poorly maintained nuclear facilities might become orders of magnitude more hazardous. "During power operations of light-water-cooled, pressurized water nuclear power reactors, radiation-induced embrittlement will degrade certain mechanical properties important to maintaining the structural integrity of the reactor pressure vessel (RPV). Specifically, fast-neutron (E > 1 MeV) radiation-induced embrittlement of the RPV steel could lead to a compromise of the vessel integrity, under extreme conditions of temperature and pressure, through a reduction in the steel’s fracture toughness. This so-called fast-neutron embrittlement is a complex function of many factors including the neutron fluence, the neutron energy spectrum, and the chemical composition of the steel. Additional factors may also come into play, such as the neutron fluence-rate, whose effects have not been fully investigated. Because of the obvious safety implications brought about by a potential breach in the pressure vessel’s integrity, the US Nuclear Regulatory Commission (US NRC) has issued requirements designed to help ensure that the structural integrity of the reactor pressure vessel is preserved.". The requirements of this objective, however, assume that the reactor was built to stringent safety factors.

=== Damage to semiconductors ===
Ionizing radiation can destroy or reset semiconductors. There is a difference, however, in damage done by ionizing radiation and by electromagnetic pulse. Electromagnetic Pulse (EMP) MASINT is a discipline that is complementary to nuclear MASINT.
