= Foreign instrumentation signals intelligence =

Interception of communications between a foreign adversary's systems

In espionage, foreign instrumentation signals intelligence, abbreviated FISINT, is intelligence from the interception of foreign electromagnetic emissions associated with the testing and operational deployment of foreign aerospace, surface, and subsurface systems. Since it deals with signals that have communicational content, it is a subset of Communications Intelligence (COMINT), which, in turn, is a subset of signals intelligence (SIGINT). Unlike general COMINT signals, the content of FISINT signals is not in regular human language, but rather in machine to machine (instrumentation) language or in a combination of regular human language and instrumentation language. FISINT is also considered as a subset of MASINT (measurement and signature intelligence).

Typical examples of such communication include:

- Telemetry data (TELINT). Missiles, satellites and other remotely monitored devices often transmit streams of data concerning their location, speed, engine status and other metrics.
- Video data links. These may be from UAVs or from satellites used for reconnaissance.
- Remote access and control transmissions, such as from remote keyless systems and wireless traffic light control systems.
- Command signals used in teleoperation, such as the control of aerial vehicles, missiles and remotely-controlled robots.

== Telecommunications ==
In telecommunications, the term FISINT has the following meanings:

1. Intelligence information derived from electromagnetic emissions associated with the testing and operational deployment of foreign aerospace, surface, and subsurface systems.
2. Technical information and intelligence information derived from the intercept of foreign instrumentation signals by other than the intended recipients. Foreign instrumentation signals intelligence is a category of signals intelligence.

Foreign instrumentation signals include but are not limited to signals from telemetry, beaconry, electronic interrogators, tracking/fusing/arming/firing command systems, and video data links.

== See also ==
- SIGINT: Signals intelligence
  - COMINT: Communications intelligence
  - ELINT: Electronic intelligence
- HUMINT: Human intelligence
- IMINT: Imagery intelligence
- MASINT: Measurement and signature intelligence
- Missile guidance
- Intelligence collection management
