= UTAMS Motor, Rocket, Explosive Detector =

Acoustic localization sensor system

Unattended Transient Acoustic MASINT Sensor (UTAMS) Mortar, Rocket, Explosive Locator System is an acoustic localization sensor system developed by the Sensors and Electronic Devices Directorate (SEDD) of the U.S. Army Research Laboratory (ARL) in 2004. This technology is used to detect and isolate transient events such as mortar or rocket firings, munition impacts, and other explosive events. The system comprises an array of acoustic sensor stations linked via radio to a receiving base. Each sensor can monitor hostile territory, international borders, and/or detect indirect weapon fire covertly with 24-hour surveillance. These small, cost-effective, non-imaging sensors can monitor large areas with minimal power and manpower requirements.

== System concept ==
Three to five acoustic arrays are set up in a roughly equilateral configuration several hundred meters from each other. Each array detects an impulsive event such as motor/rocket launch and determines the line of bearing from the array to the launch site. The lines of bearing from each array are transmitted via radio link to a central point where the results are combined to establish the location of the firing point through triangulation. Impact points are detected and located the same way. Results are displayed on a georeferenced map as icons using a laptop PC. The system generally detects the weapons out to their maximum range and screens out false results due to local noises from vehicles, people, etc.

UTAMS can locate the x, y, and z directions from an acoustic signal and are sensitive in the 20–500 Hz frequency range. Noise canceling algorithms produced a continuous resonance that UTAMS separated out through adaptive filtering. Processing for infra-sound was combined with acoustic microphones and deployed in Iraq with smaller sensor arrays to detect rockets, small arms, and mortars.

== History ==
In 2001, ARL fielded infrasonic sensors (<20 Hz) in the Republic of Korea to meet a U.S. Army requirement for passive surveillance systems to detect artillery fire (8–10 Hz) in the vicinity of the Demilitarized Zone. To meet the new requirement that came out of Iraq in 2004, ARL reconfigured the infrasonic sensor processing box to be used with acoustic sensors for the UTAMS detection of mortar fire (<100 Hz). The Rapid Equipping Force funded UTAMS in 2005 and 2006 for use in Iraq for Forward Operating Base protection.

In 2006, UTAMS II was designed, based on lessons learned from previous fielding, and automatic alignment with two GPS sensors for precise pointing direction. Solar panels with batteries were used as power sources to reduce power requirements. The Miniature Acoustic Warning System (MAWS) is a mobile UTAMS in a smaller package.

In 2012, the Program Manager Ground Sensors took over fielding.

== Extended capabilities ==
UTAMS were deployed with various configurations since the program started in 2004. One such configuration was the integration of UTAMS with the Persistent Threat Detection System (PTDS) and the Persistent Ground Surveillance System (PGSS) aerostat surveillance systems as well as the Rocket Launch Spotter. ARL also demonstrated increased range detection and localization capabilities by mounting a UTAMS variant under a tethered aerostat, named the aerostat-mounted UTAMS system (AMUS). In each of these systems, UTAMS would send acoustic detection locations to cue camera systems to focus surveillance efforts on areas where suspicious activities are occurring.

The capability to review past events was added to allow the user to analyze historical sensor detection and target localization. Live data is continuously being processed by the ground station; however, users can view previous events in the review mode. To share critical situational awareness information on the battlefield, UTAMS provided a flexible message output system to transmit sensor and target detection.

== Recognition ==
In 2004, the UTAMS Mortar, Rocket, Explosive Locator System was awarded the U.S. Army's Greatest Inventions.
