= Telemetry intelligence =

Interception of foreign adversaries' communication with remote devices

In espionage, telemetry intelligence (TELINT) is a subdiscipline of foreign instrumentation signals intelligence (FISINT) which is concerned with missiles and other remotely monitored devices sending back continuous streams of data about their location, speed, engine status and other metrics. This data can provide information on the performance of the missile and especially its throw-weight, i.e. the potential size of its warheads.

== Strategic significance of TELINT ==
TELINT is one of the "national means of technical verification" mentioned, but not detailed, in the Strategic Arms Limitation Treaty (SALT) between the US and USSR. The SALT I treaty language "the agreements include provisions that are important steps to strengthen assurance against violations: both sides undertake not to interfere with national technical means of verification. In addition, both countries agree not to use deliberate concealment measures to impede verification." refers to, in part, a technical agreement not to encrypt strategic test telemetry and thus impede verification by TELINT.

== See also ==
- SIGINT
- ELINT
- COMINT
- FISINT
- United States Air Force in the United Kingdom § Air Transport and Special Operations
