= Intelligence cycle (target-centric approach) =

Meaning of police intelligence

The target-centric approach to intelligence is a method of intelligence analysis that Robert M. Clark introduced in his book "Intelligence Analysis: A Target-Centric Approach" in 2003 to offer an alternative methodology to the traditional intelligence cycle. Its goal is to redefine the intelligence process in such a way that all of the parts of the intelligence cycle come together as a network. It is a collaborative process where collectors, analysts and customers are integral, and information does not always flow linearly.

== Target-centric analysis ==
=== Intelligence process ===
"Intelligence Analysis: A Target-Centric Approach" by Robert M. Clark

The most common view of the intelligence process is the model known as the intelligence cycle. In the original concept of this model, the steps are isolated stages where each part has a designated purpose or task. When the contributors and collectors complete data collection, the cycle continues. While this procedure completes each part of the cycle, it may constrain the flow of information. The intelligence community often discusses the problems with this pure model and offers multiple approaches to solving them.

In the pure model, there is limited opportunity for contributors or consumers to ask questions or provide feedback. To fully understand what they analyze, analysts should have the opportunity to ask questions about the sources where collectors gathered information. Likewise, when the decision-maker receives an intelligence estimate, he or she should have the opportunity to ask questions concerning not only how the analyst reached a particular conclusion, but also questions concerning the reliability of sources.

Sherman Kent the "father of intelligence analysis," left a legacy in not only his work, but in the faculty members at the Sherman Kent Center. The faculty teaches intelligence principles to future intelligence analysts. According to Jack Davis, of the Sherman Kent Center, Kent encouraged arguments and dissent among analysts, as well as taking into account a "wide range of outside opinions." Kent also encouraged "collective responsibility for judgment," which supports a network approach to intelligence. In such a network, analysts are directly accountable for the work, and a decision maker or consumer's questions help the intelligence process by leading by pushing the analyst to challenge and refine his or her own work.

Agencies constantly modify the traditional, pure model in intelligence practice. For example, various "centers" under the Director of National Intelligence deliberately put collectors and analysts into teams.

The traditional intelligence cycle separates collectors, processors, and analysts and too often results in "throwing information over the wall" to become the next person's responsibility. Everyone neatly avoids responsibility for the quality of the final product. Because this "compartmentalized process results in formalized and relatively inflexible requirements at each stage, it is more predictable and therefore more vulnerable to an opponent’s countermeasures.”

Kurt April and Julian Bessa examined weaknesses of the competitive intelligence community in their article "A Critique of the Strategic Competitive Intelligence Process within a Global Energy Multinational." They examined two competitive intelligence processes: Competitive Strategic Business Intelligence (CIAD) and Competitive Technical Intelligence (CTI). According to April and Bessa, CIAD is a linear process where the intelligence product moves upward through the layers of the organization. In contrast, CTI is a more networked model. They found that the organizational structure associated with CIAD prevents open-sharing of information and ideas, and is a stumbling block to intelligence analysis.”

Testifying to the House Committee on Homeland Security Mr. Eliot A. Jardines, President of Open Source Publishing, Incorporated, presented a statement and supported the target-centric approach to intelligence. According to Mr. Jardines, Dr. Robert Clark "proposes a more target-centric, iterative and collaborative approach which would be far more effective than our current traditional intelligence cycle." With a target-centric approach to intelligence analysis, intelligence is collaborative, because this model creates a system where it can include all contributors, participants, and consumers. Each individual can question the model and get answers along the way. The target-centric model is a network process where the information flows unconstrained among all participants, who also focus on the objective to create a shared picture of the target. For other models and their limitations, see Analysis of competing hypotheses and cognitive traps for intelligence analysis.

== Creating the model ==
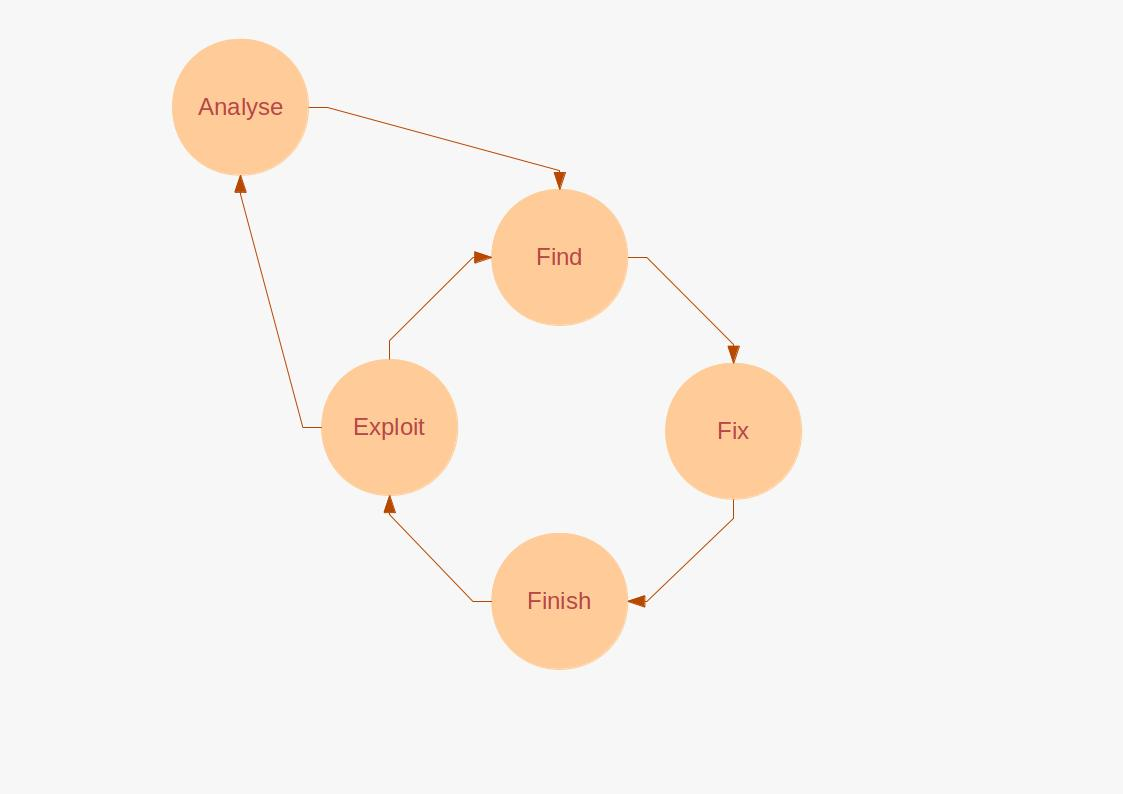
Target-centric intelligence cycle

=== Models in intelligence ===
Conceptual models are useful for the analytic process, and are particularly helpful to help understand the target-centric approach to intelligence. A conceptual model is an abstract invention of the mind that best incorporates and takes advantage of an analyst's thought process. The model allows the analyst to use a powerful descriptive tool to both estimate current situations and predict future circumstances.

=== Sources of intelligence information ===
Once the analyst constructs the skeleton structure of the model, the next step is to add substance. This is where the analyst must research, gather information, and synthesize to populate the model. For an analyst to successfully populate a model for a complex target, he or she must find information from a wide range of both classified and unclassified sources. This includes retrieving information from the body of existing intelligence. Depending on the target, an analyst may seek out information from open source intelligence (information available to the general public), human intelligence (HUMINT), measures and signatures intelligence (MASINT), signals intelligence (SIGINT), or imagery intelligence (IMINT). Even though open source information is inexpensive or free, and easily accessible, it can be just as useful as the more specialized, technical intelligence sources that are expensive to use.

=== Populating the model ===
Populating the model forces the analyst to collate the collected data, organize the data, and evaluate evidence for relevance and credibility. Finally, after the analyst examines each piece of data, the analyst must incorporate the information into the target model. As the body of information builds in the model, the analyst can more easily determine where there are inconsistencies in conclusions. This requires the analyst to carry out further research to support or deny a particular conclusion. Also, as the analyst populates the model, the target model shows where gaps exist in the model. These gaps also force the analyst to collect additional information to more completely describe the target.

== Organizational analysis ==
Clark defined an organization as a system that "can be viewed and analyzed from three perspectives: structure, function, and process." Structure describes the parts of the whole organization, emphasizing people who are part of the organization, and their relationships with one another as part of that whole. Function describes the product of the organization and emphasizes decision-making. Finally, Process describes the activities and knowledge that formulate the final product. An analyst must consider each of these components while examining a particular target organization. Most importantly, when an analyst successfully describes the target organization with a full understanding of its structure, function, and process, the model demonstrates the target's strengths and weaknesses to the analyst. Weaknesses or changes in the target organization aid the analyst in constructing a predictive, reliable analysis.

== Applications of the target-centric approach to intelligence ==
The target-centric approach to intelligence does not aim to deny other intelligence processes. Instead, it offers an alternative method to the established intelligence process. The intelligence cycle, like many other systems, continually needs improvement. In the wake of the 2001 terrorist attacks, the 9/11 Commission declared that the US intelligence community needed improvements in gathering and sharing information. According to the 9/11 Commission, U.S. intelligence agencies experienced inadequate coordination and cooperation. This is one example of failure in the intelligence cycle, where a breakdown in the accepted process led to devastating results.

General Stanley A. McChrystal wrote in 2014 about a targeting cycle called "F3EA" used in the Iraq War, which stands for:

1. Find: A target (person or location) is first identified and located.
2. Fix: The target is then kept under continuous surveillance while a Positive Identification is established.
3. Finish: A raiding force is assigned to capture or kill the target.
4. Exploit: Intelligence material is secured and mined, with detainees interrogated.
5. Analyze: Information is studied to identify further targeting opportunities.

== Criticisms ==
According to Heuer, analysts can always strive to improve estimates, and no method guarantees accurate conclusions every time. Analysts should expect intelligence failures, and refine the methodology to learn from what worked and what did not work.

Also, according to Johnston, time constraints are one of the most difficult obstacles for intelligence analysts. A target-centric model, by its very nature, is a network process that, in its ideal form, is more time-consuming than the traditional cycle. If analysts back-track to collaborate with collectors and respond to multiple questions from decision makers, the finished product will likely take a longer amount of time to reach the decision maker.
