= Intelligence officer =

Person employed by an organization to collect, compile and/or analyze information

An intelligence officer is a member of the intelligence field employed by an organization to collect, compile, or analyze information (known as intelligence) which is of use to that organization. The word of officer is a working title, not a rank, used in the same way a "police officer" can also be a sergeant, or in the military, in which non-commissioned personnel may serve as intelligence officers.

Organizations which employ intelligence officers include armed forces, police, and customs agencies.

== Sources of intelligence ==
Intelligence officers make use of a variety of sources of information, including

Communications intelligence (COMINT)
Eavesdropping and interception of communications (e.g., by wiretapping) including signals intelligence (SIGINT) and electronic intelligence (ELINT).
Financial intelligence (FININT)
The gathering of information about the financial affairs of entities of interest.
Human intelligence (HUMINT)
Derived from covert human intelligence sources (Covert Human Intelligence Source or CHIS, agents or moles) from a variety of agencies and activities.
Imagery intelligence (IMINT)
Derived from numerous collection assets, such as reconnaissance satellites or aircraft.
Measurement and signature intelligence (MASINT)
Derived from collection assets that collect and evaluate technical profiles and specific characteristics of certain targeted entities.
Open-source intelligence (OSINT)
Derived from publicly available sources such as the Internet, library materials, newspapers, etc.
Technical intelligence (TECHINT)
Based on scientific and technical characteristics of weapons systems, technological devices and other entities.

== Role and responsibilities ==
The actual role carried out by an intelligence officer varies depending on the remit of their parent organization. Officers of foreign intelligence agencies (e.g. the United States' Central Intelligence Agency, the United Kingdom's Secret Intelligence Service (MI6) and the Australian Secret Intelligence Service (ASIS)) may spend much of their careers abroad. Officers of domestic intelligence agencies (such as the United States' Federal Bureau of Investigation, the Canadian Security Intelligence Service, the UK's Security Service (MI5) and the Australian Security Intelligence Organisation (ASIO)) are responsible for counter-terrorism, counter-espionage, counter-proliferation and the detection and prevention of serious organized crime within their own countries (although, in Britain, the National Crime Agency is responsible for dealing with serious organized crime).

Titles and responsibilities common among intelligence officers include:

Field officer
An officer who manages the intelligence collection plan for specific missions in foreign countries.
Case officer
An officer who runs intelligence agents in order to collect raw intelligence information. Case officers spend their time recruiting and exploiting source agents in order to collect HUMINT.
Collections officer (collector)
An officer who collects information, not necessarily from human sources but from technical sources such as wiretaps, bugs, cyber-collection, MASINT devices, SIGINT devices and other means.
Operations officer
An officer who plans or enacts the necessary steps to disrupt or prevent activities of hostile individuals or groups.
Analyst
An officer who analyzes collected information and results of operations to determine the identities, intentions, capabilities and activities of hostile individuals or groups and to determine requirements for future operations. After analysis, analysts are also responsible for the production and dissemination of their final product.
Counterintelligence officer
An officer that works to prevent detection, penetration, manipulation and compromise of the intelligence agency, its operations and overall national security by foreign, domestic, or hostile agents. Often counterintelligence officers are law enforcement officers, as is the case with the Special Agents of the Federal Bureau of Investigation's Counterintelligence Division and the Diplomatic Security Service's Counterintelligence Division. This is often done in order to arrest moles and foreign intelligence agents. However, counter-intelligence officers can and do actively handle sources and agents in order to collect raw intelligence information.

=== Intelligence agents ===
Intelligence agents are individuals that work for or have been recruited by an intelligence officer, but who are not employed by the intelligence agency of the intelligence officer. Sometime around 2000, the United States Intelligence Community adopted a more "corporate" vocabulary and began referring to agents as assets. Intelligence agents can be of several types:

Source agent
A primary source of intelligence information. This is the classic HUMINT source.
Access agent
An agent who identifies and approaches potential sources (eventual source agents) for assessment or recruitment. In counter-proliferation (CP) access agents are often scientists. In counter-terrorism (CT) access agents are often religious or ideological leaders.
Agent provocateur
An agent who infiltrates hostile organizations with the intent of spreading disinformation from within or disrupting their operations through enticement and sabotage.
Rogue agent
A former intelligence officer, who may be subject to a burn notice, who is no longer accepting direction from their agency.
Double agent
An agent or intelligence officer who accepts direction from two or more intelligence agencies.

Contrary to popular belief or what is seen in Hollywood films, professionally trained intelligence officers are never referred to as agents, secret agents or special agents (except in the case of FBI Special Agents). They are most often referred to as case officers or operations officers. Agents are the foreigners who betray their own countries to pass information to the officer; "agents" in the intelligence world are more commonly referred to as confidential informants, sources, or assets.

== See also ==
- Intelligence agency
- Espionage
