= Intelligence cycle =

Stages of intelligence information processing

The intelligence cycle is an idealized model of how intelligence is processed in civilian and military intelligence agencies, and law enforcement organizations. The Intelligence Cycle was invented in the United States in 1948 by Phillip Davidson and Robert Glass while they were serving as staffers at the United States Army Command and General Staff College. From the US Army, the theory was spread throughout the intelligence field, where it is the most popular working theory of intelligence management today. It is a closed path consisting of repeating nodes, which (if followed) will result in finished intelligence. The stages of the intelligence cycle include the issuance of requirements by decision makers, collection, processing, analysis, and publication (i.e., dissemination) of intelligence. The circuit is completed when decision makers provide feedback and revised requirements. The intelligence cycle is also called intelligence process by the U.S. Department of Defense (DoD) and the uniformed services.

== Conceptual model ==
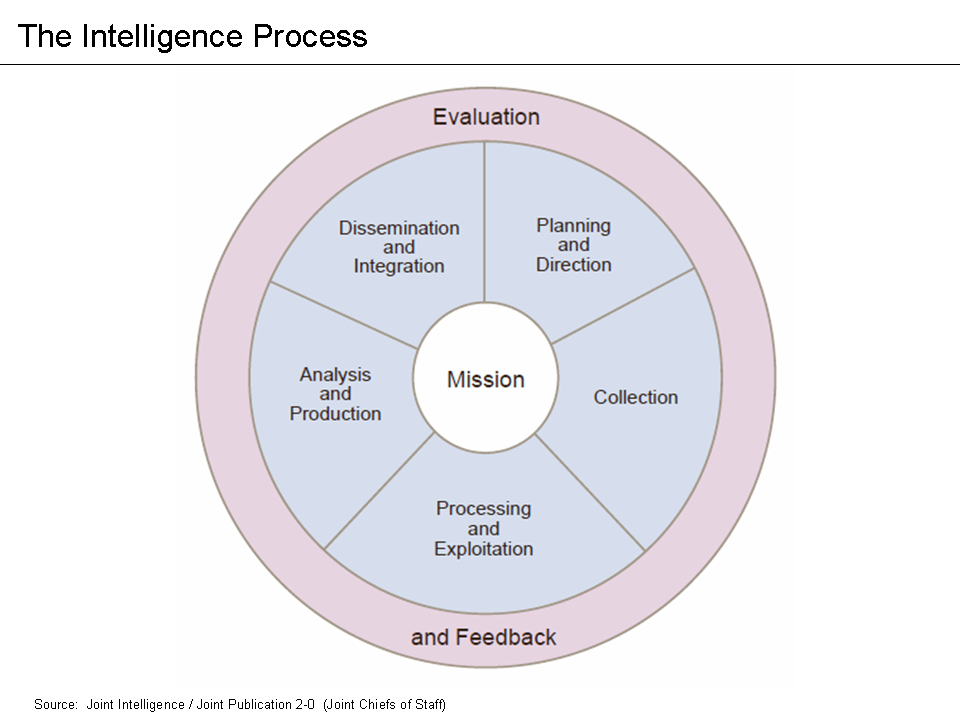
The intelligence process or cycle

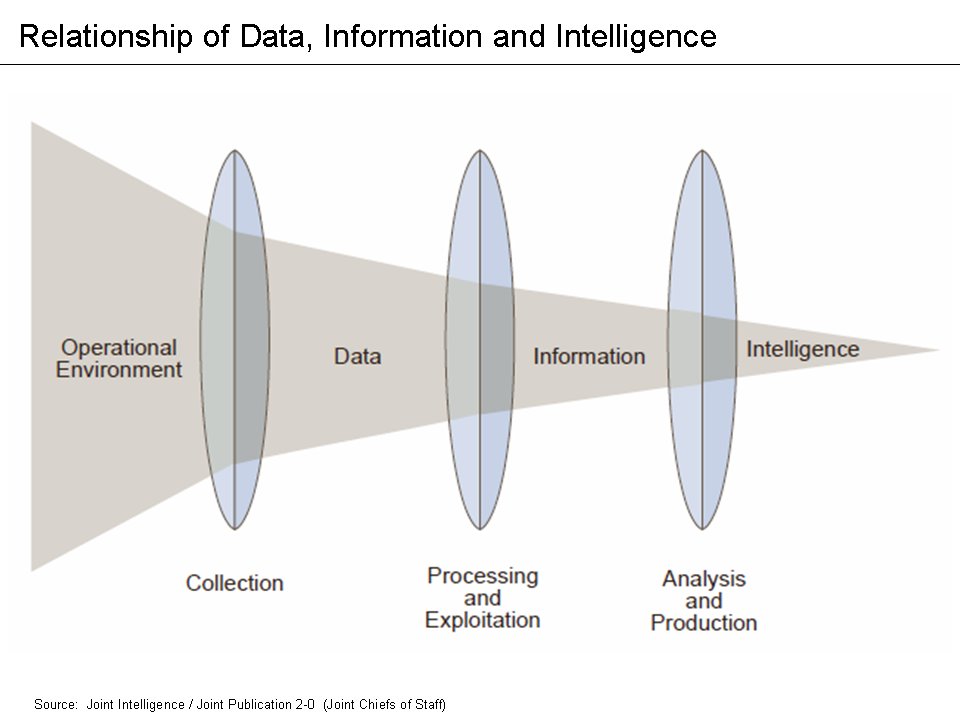
Intelligence reflects a progressive refinement of data and information

=== Direction ===
Intelligence requirements are determined by a decision maker to meet their objectives. In the federal government of the United States, requirements (or priorities) can be issued from the White House or the Congress. In NATO, a commander uses requirements (sometimes called Essential elements of information (EEIs)) to initiate the intelligence cycle.

=== Collection ===
In response to requirements, an intelligence staff develops an intelligence collection plan applying available sources and methods and seeking intelligence from other agencies. Collection includes inputs from several intelligence gathering disciplines, such as HUMINT (human intelligence), IMINT (imagery intelligence), ELINT (electronic intelligence), SIGINT (Signals Intelligence), OSINT (open source, or publicly available intelligence), etc.

=== Processing and exploitation ===
Once the collection plan is executed and the data arrives, it is processed for exploitation. This involves the translation of raw intelligence materials from a foreign language, evaluation of relevance and reliability, and collation of the raw data in preparation for exploitation.

=== Analysis ===
Analysis establishes the significance and implications of processed intelligence, integrates it by combining disparate pieces of information to identify collateral information and patterns, then interprets the significance of any newly developed knowledge.

=== Dissemination ===
Finished intelligence products take many forms depending on the needs of the decision maker and reporting requirements. The level of urgency of various types of intelligence is typically established by an intelligence organization or community. For example, an indications and warning (I&W) bulletin would require higher precedence than an annual report.

=== Feedback ===
The intelligence cycle is a closed loop; feedback is received from the decision maker and revised requirements issued.

== Intelligence information cycle theory ==
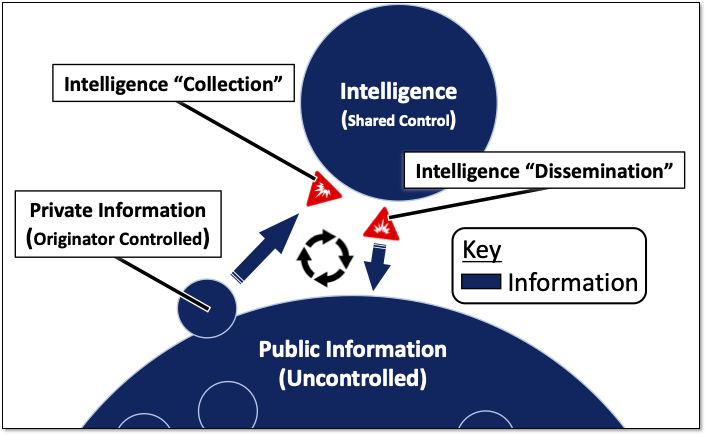
The intelligence information cycle shows the transition of information from private- to secret- to public information. The transition points, "collection" and "dissemination," are points of conflict in this transition.

The intelligence information cycle leverages secrecy theory and U.S. regulation of classified intelligence to re-conceptualize the traditional intelligence cycle under the following four assumptions:

1. Intelligence is secret information
2. Intelligence is a public good
3. Intelligence moves cyclically
4. Intelligence is hoarded

Information is transformed from privately held to secretly held to public based on who has control over it. For example, the private information of a source becomes secret information (intelligence) when control over its dissemination is shared with an intelligence officer, and then becomes public information when the intelligence officer further disseminates it to the public by any number of means, including formal reporting, threat warning, and others. The fourth assumption, intelligence is hoarded, causes conflict points where information transitions from one type to another. The first conflict point, collection, occurs when private transitions to secret information (intelligence). The second conflict point, dissemination, occurs when secret transitions to public information. Thus, conceiving of intelligence using these assumptions demonstrates the cause of collection techniques (to ease the private-secret transition) and dissemination conflicts, and can inform ethical standards of conduct among all agents in the intelligence process.

== See also ==
- Decision cycle – Sequence of steps for decision-making
- DIKW pyramid – Data, information, knowledge, wisdom hierarchy
- Intelligence analysis – Analysing secret intelligence
- Intelligence assessment – Evaluation of sensitive state, military, commercial, or scientific information
- Intelligence cycle (target-centric approach) – Meaning of police intelligence
- Intelligence cycle management – Guiding the intelligence cycle
- Intelligence collection management – Process of managing and organising the collection of evidence
- Intelligence analysis management
- Intelligence dissemination management – Maxim of intelligence
- Learning cycle – How people learn from experience
- List of intelligence gathering disciplines
- OODA loop – Observe–orient–decide–act cycle
