= All-source intelligence =

Intelligence using multiple sources

All-source intelligence is a term used to describe intelligence organizations, intelligence analysts, or intelligence products that are based on all available sources of intelligence collection information.

== History ==
The definition of all-source intelligence has changed over time. Intelligence analysts that produced intelligence primarily from SIGINT or IMINT, for instance, were considered single-INT producers. Because of the need to incorporate all-relevant information in reporting, IMINT analysts became GEOINT analysts that include not only IMINT but relevant information from other intelligence sources. This was especially important in the aftermath of the 9/11 intelligence failures. In 2004, following the 9/11 Commission's recommendations, the U.S. government established the National Counterterrorism Center (NCTC), which is the primary U.S. organization for analyzing and integrating all terrorism-related intelligence. In the aftermath of these events, collaborative tools such as A-Space and Intellipedia are used for collaboration amongst all members of the Intelligence Community.

== Sources ==
Sources considered for use in all-source intelligence analysis include the following:

- HUMINT – Intelligence gathered through interpersonal contact
- MASINT – Technical branch of intelligence gathering
- SIGINT – Intelligence-gathering by interception of signals
- GEOINT - The exploitation and analysis of imagery and geospatial information to describe physical features and location-based activities.
  - IMINT – Intelligence gathered by means of imagery
- OSINT – Data collected from publicly available sources to be used in an intelligence context
- TECHINT – Information about the weapons and technological capabilities of a foreign adversary

== Organizations ==
The following organizational components of the U.S. Intelligence Community employ analysts that produce all-source intelligence:

- Central Intelligence Agency Directorate of Analysis
- Defense Intelligence Agency Directorate for Analysis
- United States Army Intelligence and Security Command's National Ground Intelligence Center
- Office of Naval Intelligence's Farragut Technical Analysis Center
- U.S. Air Force's National Air and Space Intelligence Center
- U.S Marine Corps Intelligence's Marine Corps Intelligence Activity
- United States Department of State's Bureau of Intelligence and Research
- National Security Agency (select components)
- National Geospatial-Intelligence Agency
- Federal Bureau of Investigation's Intelligence Branch
- United States Coast Guard's Coast Guard Intelligence
- DHS Office of Intelligence and Analysis
- United States Department of Treasury's Office of Terrorism and Financial Intelligence
- Drug Enforcement Administration's DEA Office of National Security Intelligence
- United States Department of Energy's Office of Intelligence and Counterintelligence
- Office of the Director of National Intelligence: National Counterproliferation Center (NCPC), National Counterterrorism Center (NCTC), National Intelligence Council (NIC), Office of the National Counterintelligence Executive (ONCIX)

== See also ==
- Sentient (intelligence analysis system)
