= Intelligence failure =

Failure in the intelligence cycle or intelligence failure, is the outcome of the inadequacies within the intelligence cycle. The intelligence cycle itself consists of six steps that are constantly in motion: requirements, collection, processing and exploitation, analysis and production, dissemination and consumption, and feedback.

== Collection ==
The collection of intelligence is through five methods: Human Intelligence (HUMINT), Signals Intelligence (SIGINT), Image Intelligence (IMINT), Open Source Intelligence (OSINT), and Measures and Signature Intelligence (MASINT). It is common to rely on technology when performing collection, however it can fail and cause more problems than it solves.

=== SIGINT ===
Signals intelligence is the information collected via the interception of signals. It can further divided into Communications Intelligence (COMINT), Electronic Intelligence (ELINT), Telemetry Intelligence (TELINT), and Radar Transmitters (RADINT). While these systems have their strengths, such as the ability to intercept communication or to gain information about weapons systems, they also have their weaknesses.

==== COMINT ====
Gaining accurate communications intelligence can be achieved, but more often than not, the adversary will not communicate in such a way that would allow the information to be intercepted easily. The classic case of communications intelligence failure is Operation Gold during the Cold War in which the Central Intelligence Agency and the British Secret Intelligence Service planned to tap landline communications to the Soviet Army headquarters in Berlin. The Soviets were alerted to the plan by a mole within the SIS but allowed the operation to go forward. The information that was given out via the tap was disinformation by the Soviets. That led to a failure in the intelligence itself.

Another setback in communication intelligence is code-breaking. That falls into two categories: verbal codes and transmitted codes. For an analyst listening to an intercepted phone call, the process of gaining information may seem simple. However, the situation becomes complicated when the individuals begin to use "slang" or colloquialisms in their conversation. What seems like a harmless conversation could prove dangerous. Furthermore, the calls themselves may be encrypted as well, further complicating the problem. Also, there is the issue of transmitted information being encoded. Lowenthal states in collection portion of his book that codebreakers like to boast that any code that can be created can be solved, but the public has access to increasingly stronger cipher programs now and those programs are harder to break.

==== ELINT, TELINT, RADINT ====
These three "ints" relate to each other and separate discussion of them would be pointless. Simple procedures can be taken to reduce the chances of information being received by a gathering method. As was mentioned before with communication, test data or telemetry data can be encoded before it is sent. It can also be encapsulated and released for pick up.

=== IMINT ===
Imagery intelligence refers to information gathered by planes, unmanned aerial vehicles (UAV), and satellites.

==== Satellites ====
Causes of failures to gain intelligence via satellites included meteorological and human.

Matters of weather play a large role in IMINT failure. Radar imaging can see through clouds, but it is unlikely that a general satellite sweep could find something buried under a few feet of snow or in a frozen lake. Another problem with satellite imagery is that it is a simple snapshot in time. If the satellite that captures the image is not in a geo-synchronous orbit, there is a risk of the target not being there when the satellite passes over the area again.

There is also the possibility of camouflage. For example, the entrance to an underground bunker may be camouflaged with foliage, and it would take an arduous examination of the image to find the information that is needed.

Another potential failure is a satellite being unavailable when it is needed because it is being used for other intelligence purposes, which causes the situation or event of interest to be missed. Images can also be misinterpreted and misleading information and potentially support a bad decision.

==== Airplanes and UAVs ====
Airplanes and UAVs can respond more quickly to requests for data collection than satellites and have fewer issues of failure, but their failures tend to be greater in magnitude. If airplanes and UAVs are sent to the wrong destination, it is unlikely that the information will be collected. If the aircraft is destroyed during the mission, unless information was being transmitted at the time, its data is lost.

=== OSINT ===
Open source information is derived from newspapers, journals, radio and television, and the Internet. There is a growing emphasis on the use of OSINT however, there are several points where collection via OSINT can fail.

==== Information reliability ====
Source reliability is one of the major points that hinders collection with this method. Reading the paper of country in which a dictator<s government runs the media is unlikely to lead to an unbiased account of the facts. The same thing applies to use of the internet to gain information. Censorship controls over the internet in some countries limit the amount of information that is made available.

==== Issues with analysts ====
From the standpoint of the analyst themselves, there are also issues regarding the use of OSINT. Most individuals scan a webpage for the information they need, and if it is not there, they move on. That transfers to the analytic community as well. Secondly, it is difficult for an analyst to get information via the internet when most analysts lack the use of the internet in their agencies. Thirdly, the volume of data alone is often too much for an analyst to sift through causing important knowledge to slip by.

=== MASINT ===
Measurement and Signature Intelligence (MASINT) is scientific and technical intelligence information obtained by quantitative and qualitative analysis of data (metric, angle, spatial, wavelength, time dependence, modulation, plasma, and hydromagnetic) derived from specific technical sensors for the purpose of identifying any distinctive features associated with the source, emitter, or sender and to facilitate subsequent identification and/or measurement of the same.

MASINT is hardly understood by most analysts or the decision-makers who look at it, which is in itself is one of its major drawbacks. It also suffers from finance issues because of the expensive nature of the items needed to do the actual collection itself. Also, its exploitation and analysis often take longer because highly-trained analysts are needed to examine the information.

== Processing and exploitation ==
Processing and exploitation involves converting the vast amount of information collected to a form usable by analysts. This is done through a variety of methods including decryption, language translation, and data reduction. Processing includes the entering of raw data into databases where it can be exploited for use in the analysis process.

=== Failures in processing ===
The problem within this step of the process is that there is often too much information but there are too few analysts to process it. That leads to large amounts of information that was collected never being utilized because they do not meet the exact needs for the collection requirement. Thus, important data may be cast aside and never used even if it may be relevant again later.

== Analysis and production ==
Analysts are the voice of the intelligence community. Therefore, the analysis that they perform is expected to be accurate on a regular basis. Failure in analysis can be approached from two points of view: the tactical/operational point of view and the analysts point of view.

=== Tactical/operational ===
A problem occurs at current issues are looked at as opposed to long-term issues. Ideally, the tasking should be 50/50 so that no type of issue gets more analysis than the other. In an ever-changing world, there is a tendency to place more emphasis on tactical/current issues. That hinders the operational and long-term issues by putting analysis of them off in favor of current issues.

=== Analysts ===
The tasking itself is not the only way in which analysis can fail. The human component of analysis is just as important. One of the leading causes of analyst failure is cognitive biases, mental errors that are caused by our simplified information processing strategies. In other words, cognitive biases result not from any emotional or intellectual predisposition toward a certain judgment but rather from subconscious mental procedures for processing information. Those biases can occur not only with a single analyst but also with an entire office of them, which leads to a biased form of "groupthink."

Other forms of bias such as cultural, organizational, or bias from the analysts self-interest and need to succeed. The need to succeed coupled with the level of competition within the community to get their analysis on the desk of a top decision maker. Another point of failure is with the training of the analysts or the lack of. The Iraq Intelligence Commission found that a lack of analysts with the proper scientific or technological training who are needed to perform proper analysis contributed to a failure of analysis.

== Dissemination and consumption ==
When the decision-maker receives a report from an analyst and reviews it, that process is referred to as dissemination and consumption. In the intelligence community, there are several types of documents that get disseminated regularly. For example, the President's Daily Brief (PDB) is a document that is disseminated to the president of the United States on a daily basis and includes the recent information on important matters. The goal of dissemination is simple, get the information that is relevant to the decision maker in a timely fashion while being accurate.

=== Failures in dissemination ===
Perhaps the greatest failure in dissemination of information is the failure to get the information to the proper decision-maker. A report on crop futures in Burkina Faso would not be of interest to the Secretary of Education for example.

Another issue to consider for the crop report would be if it is important enough to report. If the information does not meet a certain requirement there is a chance that it will not be reported. However, if it is important enough to report, the question is how quickly it should be reported.

If the information is time-sensitive but is not disseminated in enough time to have the desired effect, the process will fail. Compartmentalization in the isolation of planners from flow of intelligence or the invocation of need to know among analysts strongly contributes to failures in dissemination.

== Feedback ==
Feedback is the last step in the intelligence process. The goal of the feedback part of the cycle is to give feedback to the analysts about the quality of the product that was produced.

=== Failures in feedback ===
The main failure in feedback is when the decision maker-fails to offer it to the analyst. It is possible for there to be feedback failure even if feedback is offered. That occurs when the decision-makers fail to get the feedback to the analyst in a timely order, which would assist in the production of the next report to them.

== See also ==
- Bias
- Conformity
- In-group bias
- Institutional bias
- Security sector governance and reform
- Self-serving bias
