= NATO Open Source Intelligence Reader =

The NATO Open Source Intelligence Reader is one of three standard references on open-source intelligence. The other two are the NATO Open Source Intelligence Handbook and the NATO Intelligence Exploitation of the Internet.

== Sources ==
- NATO Open Source Intelligence Reader
