= NATO Open Source Intelligence Handbook =

The NATO Open Source Intelligence Handbook is the standard reference available to the public. The other two NATO references are the NATO Open Source Intelligence Reader and the NATO Intelligence Exploitation of the Internet.

== Sources ==
- NATO Open Source Intelligence Handbook
