= Essential elements of information =

JP 1-02

Essential elements of information (EEI) is any critical intelligence information required by intelligence consumers to perform their mission. The EEI are specific to a particular event, thing, or other target individual. The EEI are written out in advance as questions by consumers of the EEI information. Then, the EEI questions are used by collectors of the information that may not be in direct contact with the consumer at the time the information is collected. A specific set of EEIs are used by collectors to develop a collection plan to find the answers to the questions in the EEIs. EEIs are also used in non-intelligence fields, such as responders to crisis events or medical emergencies.

== Definitions ==
The United States Department of Defense defines EEI as follows:

"The most critical information requirements regarding the adversary and the environment needed by the commander by a particular time to relate with other available information and intelligence in order to assist in reaching a logical decision. Also called EEIs."

The United Kingdom Ministry of Defence defines EEI as follows:

"These represent the intelligence consumers’ specific requirements. Expressing complex intelligence requirements as a collection of essential elements of information provides the additional level of guidance needed by intelligence collectors and analysts to achieve the desired effect."

The United States Army eliminated the term EEI from its doctrine in August 2014, though Joint doctrine still uses the term.

== Examples ==
An air force unit might have the following EEI about SA-20 batteries:

- "what is the current location of the adversary SA-20 battery?"

A medical crisis manager might have the following EEIs:

- What is the scope of the incident and the response?
- How will it affect service delivery?
- Where are the impacted communities?
- What population is impacted?
- What is the anticipated medical surge?
- Determine communication means
- Evaluate healthcare organization, staff and supplies
  - Healthcare facility status
  - Consider healthcare facility incident command status
- Determine health department status
- Identify who need to know
- Identify resources to be deployed
- Consider healthcare facility decompression initiatives
