= Intelligence collection plan =

An intelligence collection plan (ICP) is the systematic process used by most modern armed forces and intelligence services to meet intelligence requirements through the tasking of all available resources to gather and provide pertinent information within a required time limit. Creating a collection plan is part of the intelligence cycle.

While an ICP has no prescribed doctrinal format, it must use all available collection capabilities to meet the decision maker's priority requirements. It must be precise and concise, yet a working document that is flexible enough to respond to changes as they occur.

== Process ==
Developing an ICP typically involves five stages:

=== Requirements ===
Identifying the intelligence requirements or the decision maker’s intent ensures that information collected is pertinent and that time and resources are not wasted.

=== Assets, resources, and deterrents ===
At this stage, assets, resources, and obstacles are determined to help guide collection. Assets and resources are broken down into categories of sources and contacts and the value and extent of use for each asset and resource is evaluated. Deterrents to collection are identified and plans are developed to address deterrents. Travel plans are designed to overcome geographical barriers and emergency plans are conceived to address possible problems that may be encountered.

=== Priorities ===
A strategy is then devised based on the previous steps to prioritize collection. This ensures that all requirements are adequately addressed, and that more important requirements receive an adequate amount of attention.

=== Taskings ===
Those who will do the collecting are then given tasks based on the previous steps. This ensures that each collector has a manageable amount of work and that someone is responsible for each requirement. It also makes collectors accountable for their areas of responsibility.

=== Evaluation and updates ===
Once collection has begun, it is important to track progress to ensure that the requirements are being appropriately addressed and that time schedules are being met. When tracking progress in collection, there are several stages in which a task may be. It may be pending assignment, in process, on hold, reassigned, completed, or canceled, depending on the stage of the ICP process and any changes that may have occurred during collection.

It is also important to update the plan and keep it current as the situation and the needs and requirements of the decision maker changes. This flexibility ensures that the intelligence needs are better met when dealing with dynamic problems.

== See also ==
- Intelligence collection management
