= Intelligence requirement =

Listing of intelligence priorities by officials

Intelligence requirements (IR) are a ranking of topics or issues by priority which are used to inform the allocation of resources for intelligence collection. They define the intended end product, prescribe required resources, and identify gaps in capabilities for collection management. Once an intelligence requirement is identified, it is the responsibility of the decision maker's intelligence staff or if requested, supporting intelligence organization(s), to collect and disseminate the required information. The identification of intelligence requirements and the collection and dissemination of the required information are parts of the intelligence cycle. In the United States Intelligence Community (IC), requirements must comply with the National Intelligence Priorities Framework (NIPF).
