= Human intelligence (intelligence gathering) =

Intelligence gathered through interpersonal contact

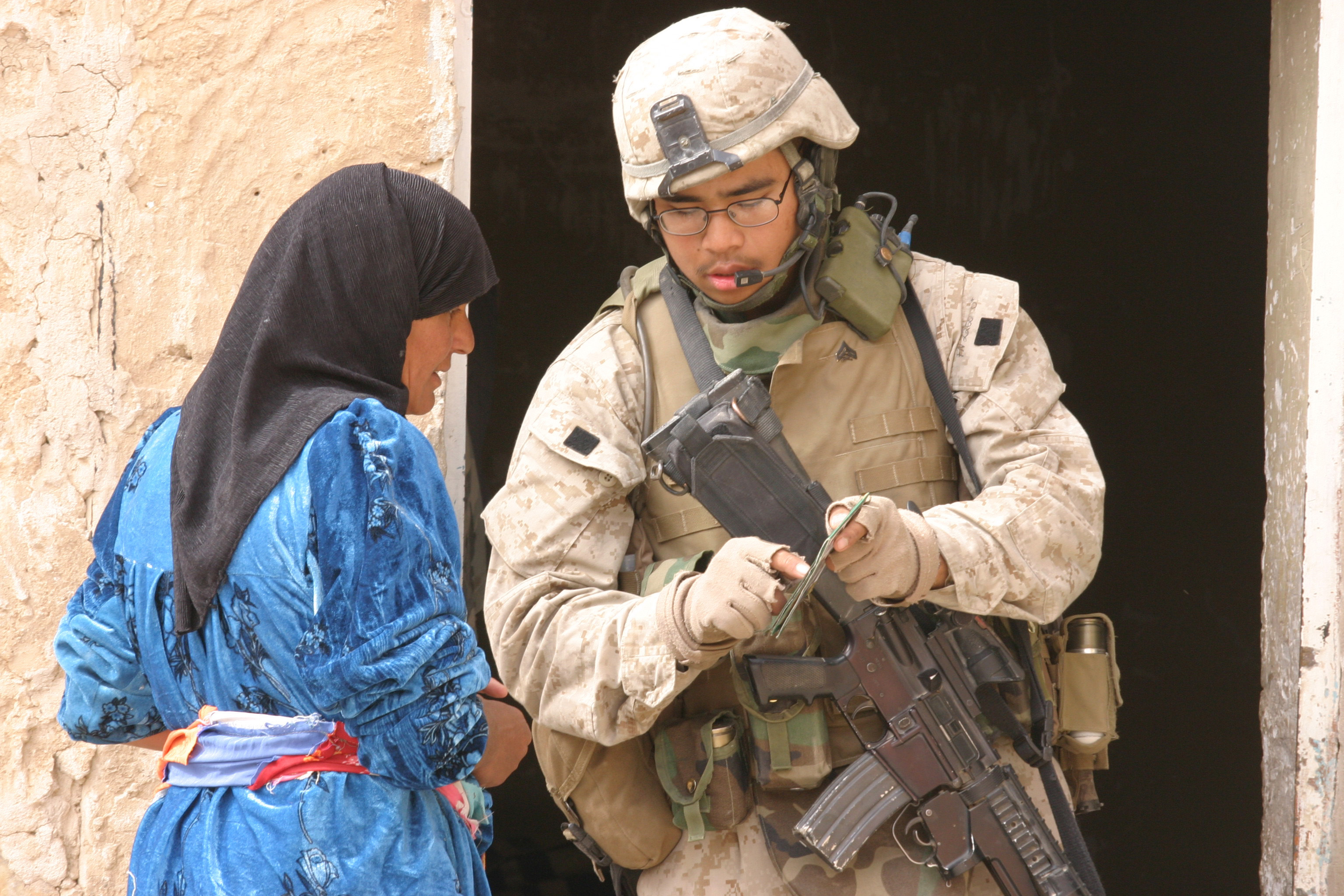
A U.S. Marine asking a local woman about weapons in Fallujah during the Iraq War

Human intelligence (HUMINT, pronounced /ˈhjuːmɪnt/ HEW-mint) is intelligence-gathering by means of human sources and interpersonal communication. It is distinct from more technical intelligence-gathering disciplines, such as signals intelligence (SIGINT), imagery intelligence (IMINT) and measurement and signature intelligence (MASINT). HUMINT can be conducted in a variety of ways, including via espionage, reconnaissance, interrogation, and witness interviews. Although associated with military and intelligence agencies, HUMINT can also apply in various civilian sectors such as law enforcement.

== Overview ==
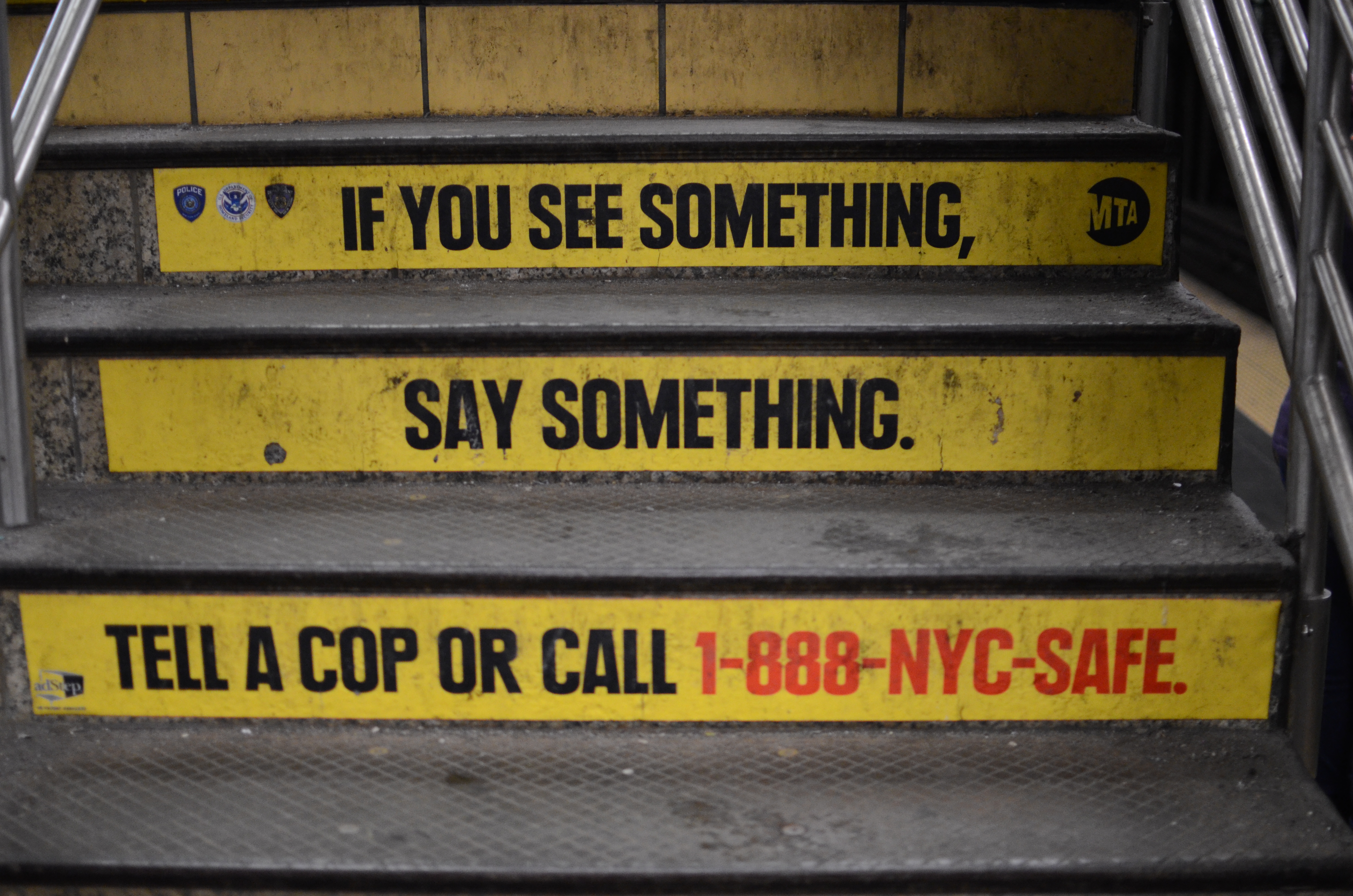
"If you see something, say something" Sign in the United States

NATO defines HUMINT as "a category of intelligence derived from information collected and provided by human sources." A typical HUMINT activity consists of interrogations and conversations with persons having access to information.

As the name suggests, human intelligence is mostly collected by people and is commonly provided via espionage or some other form of covert surveillance. However, there are also overt methods of collection, such as via interrogation of subjects or simply through interviews.

The manner in which HUMINT operations are conducted is dictated by both official protocol and the nature of the source of the information. Within the context of the United States Armed Forces' military intelligence, HUMINT activity may involve clandestine activities; however, these operations are more closely associated with CIA projects. Both counterintelligence and HUMINT include clandestine human intelligence and its associated operational techniques.

== Sources ==
Typically, sources of HUMINT generally include:

- Advisors or foreign internal defense personnel working with host nation forces or populations
- Diplomatic reporting by accredited diplomats
- Espionage clandestine reporting, access agents, couriers, cutouts
- Military attachés
- Non-governmental organizations
- Prisoners of war or detainees
- Refugees
- Routine patrolling (military police, patrols, etc.)
- Special reconnaissance
- Traveler debriefing

The first steps for recruiting HUMINT sources is spotting and assessing a target. Surveillance of targets (e.g., military or other establishments, open source or compromised reference documents) sometimes reveals people with potential access to information, but no clear means of approaching them. With this group, a secondary survey is in order. Headquarters may be able to suggest an approach, perhaps through a third party or through resources not known to the field station.

== Notable examples ==
- Oleg Penkovsky was a Soviet GRU colonel who served as a source to the United Kingdom and the United States by informing them of the precise knowledge necessary to address rapidly developing military tensions with the Soviet Union.

== See also ==
- Document Exploitation
- Intelligence collection management
- Social engineering (security) – Psychological manipulation in information security
