= Open-source intelligence =

Data collected from publicly available sources to be used in an intelligence context

Open-source intelligence (OSINT) is the collection and analysis of data gathered from 'open sources' (overt sources and publicly available information) to produce intelligence. OSINT is primarily used in national security, law enforcement, and business intelligence and is used by analysts to answer classified, unclassified, or proprietary intelligence requirements.

== Definition ==
OSINT involves the gathering of and analyzing of publicly accessible information to produce usable intelligence.

The U.S. Department of Homeland Security defines OSINT as intelligence derived from publicly available information, collected and disseminated promptly to address specific intelligence needs. NATO describes OSINT as intelligence obtained from publicly available information and other unclassified data with limited public distribution or access. The European Union defines OSINT as the collecting and analyzing information from open sources to generate actionable intelligence, supporting areas like national security, law enforcement, and business intelligence.

In the private sector, companies like IBM define OSINT as the process of gathering and analyzing publicly available information to assess threats, inform decisions, or answer specific questions. Similarly, cybersecurity firms such as CrowdStrike describe OSINT as the act of collecting and analyzing publicly available data for intelligence purposes.

== Categories ==
OSINT sources can be divided up into six different categories of information flow:

- Media: print newspapers, magazines, radio, and television from across and between countries.
- Internet: online publications, blogs, discussion groups, citizen media (i.e. – cell phone videos, and user created content), YouTube, and other social media websites (i.e. – Facebook, Twitter, Instagram, etc.). This source also outpaces a variety of other sources due to its timeliness and ease of access.
- Public government data: public government reports, budgets, hearings, telephone directories, press conferences, websites, and speeches. Although this source comes from an official source they are publicly accessible and may be used openly and freely.
- Professional and academic publications: information acquired from journals, conferences, symposia, academic papers, dissertations, and theses.
- Commercial data: commercial imagery, financial and industrial assessments, and databases.
- Grey literature: technical reports, preprints, patents, working papers, business documents, unpublished works, and newsletters.

OSINT is distinguished from research in that it applies the process of intelligence to create tailored knowledge supportive of a specific decision by a specific individual or group.

== Collection methodologies ==
Collecting open-source intelligence is achieved in a variety of different ways, such as:

- Social media intelligence, which is acquired from viewing or observing a subject's online social profile activity.
- Search engine data mining or scraping.
- Public records checking.
- Information matching and verification from data broker services.

== Risks for practitioners ==
A main problem for practical OSINT is the volume of information it has to deal with information explosion. The amount of data being distributed publicly in the world increases at a rate that it becomes difficult to evaluate sources in intelligence analysis.

Private individuals illegally collecting data for a foreign military or intelligence agency is considered espionage in most countries. Espionage that is not treason (e.g. betraying one's country of citizenship) has been a tool of statecraft since ancient times.

== Disinformation/Misinformation risk ==
The open and accessible nature of public sources makes OSINT data particularly vulnerable to disinformation and/or misinformation. Extremist groups have been shown to use OSINT to spread misinformation and their viewpoints.

Governments and state actors have been documented intentionally disseminating disinformation through public channels to influence perceptions, confuse adversaries, or undermine trust in open-source findings. This can include planting false information in news outlets, social media, official statements, or manipulated geospatial data to mislead OSINT practitioners who rely on such sources.

== See also ==
- Open Source Information System
