= Outline of military science and technology =

Overview of and topical guide to military science and technology

The following outline is provided as an overview of and topical guide to military science:

Military science – study of the technique, psychology, practice and other phenomena which constitute war and armed conflict. It strives to be a scientific system that if properly employed, will greatly enhance the practitioner's ability to prevail in an armed conflict with any adversary. To this end, it is unconcerned whether that adversary is an opposing military force, guerrillas or other irregulars, or any adversary who knows of or utilizes military science in response.

== Topics within military science ==
- Military organization
- Military education and training
- Military history
- Military geography
- Military technology and equipment
- Military strategy, Military Tactics and doctrine
- Intelligence cycle management, Intelligence cycle security, Basic intelligence and Strategic intelligence
- Foreign policy analysis
- Diplomacy
- Leadership
- Intelligence analysis management, Intelligence analysis and Meteorological intelligence

== Types of military technology ==
Weapon

- Armour – protective clothing intended to defend its wearer from intentional harm in combat and military engagements, typically associated with soldiers
- Artillery – large caliber weapons firing projectiles one at a time. Artillery pieces are crew serviced weapons that provide direct or indirect trajectories for the shell
  - Medieval siege weaponry
- Fortifications – military constructions and buildings designed for defense in warfare–
- Martial arts – also known as fighting systems, martial arts are bodies of codified practices or traditions of training for unarmed and armed combat, usually without the use of guns and other modern weapons–
- Mêlée – hand-to-hand combat or mano-a-mano; weapons commonly used in mêlée include swords, clubs, spears, axes, or fists: almost any tool with which one can hit someone else
- Military vehicles – are land combat or transportation vehicles, excluding rail-based, which are designed for or in significant use by military forces
  - Armoured fighting vehicle
  - Armoured personnel carrier
  - Tank
- Military aviation and military aircraft – Military aviation include such areas as transport, bombing, surveillance, and aerial warfare
- Military communications – the transmission medium that links military components on the battlefield
  - Communications
  - Military engineer
- Military robots – autonomous or remote-controlled devices designed for military applications
  - Unmanned Ground Vehicles
  - Unmanned Combat Air Vehicles
  - Unmanned Undersea Vehicles
- Military thought and planning – military tactics, strategy, and doctrine
  - Military doctrine – level of military planning between national strategy and unit-level
  - Military strategy – collective name for planning the conduct of warfare
  - Military tactics – collective name for methods of engaging and defeating an enemy in battle
- Military unit – an organization within an armed force. It may consist of any number of soldiers, ships, vehicles, or aircraft. Armies, navies, and air forces, are organised hierarchically into groups of various sizes for functional, tactical and administrative purposes
  - Military rank
  - Comparative military ranks
- Munitions – often defined as a synonym for ammunition. A slightly broader definition would include bombs, missiles, warheads, and mines
  - Bullet
  - Missile
  - Bomb
  - Mine
    - Landmine
    - Naval mine
- Naval warfare – combat in and on seas and oceans
  - Navy
  - Naval ship
  - Submarine
- Computing
- Small arms and firearms – a firearm is a kinetic energy weapon that fires either a single or multiple projectiles propelled at high velocity by the gases produced by action of the rapid confined burning of a propellant

== Military by region ==
- List of militaries by country
  - List of air forces
  - List of armies by country
  - List of navies
  - List of military special forces units
- List of countries by military expenditures
- List of countries by number of active troops
- List of countries by size of armed forces
- List of countries without an army

== History of military science and technology ==
Military history

=== By historical period ===
- Prehistoric warfare
- Ancient warfare
- Medieval warfare
- Gunpowder warfare
- Industrial warfare
- Total war
- Irregular warfare
- Modern warfare

=== By battlespace ===
- Air power history
  - History of aerial warfare
- Army history
  - History of land warfare
- History of information warfare
  - History of espionage
    - Nuclear espionage
      - Atomic spies
- Naval history
  - History of naval warfare
- History of space warfare

=== By terrain ===
- History of arctic warfare
- History of cyber-warfare
- History of desert warfare
- History of jungle warfare
- History of mountain warfare
- History of urban warfare

=== By weapon technology ===
- History of armoured warfare
- History of artillery
- History of biological warfare
- History of cavalry
- History of chemical warfare
- History of electronic warfare
- History of infantry
- History of mechanized warfare
- History of sea-based and land-based mine warfare
- History of nuclear warfare
  - History of nuclear weapons
- History of psychological warfare
- History of radiological warfare
- History of ski warfare
- History of submarine warfare

=== History of military tactics ===
- History of amphibious warfare
- History of asymmetric warfare
- History of attrition warfare
- History of cavalry tactics
- History of conventional warfare
- History of fortification
- History of guerrilla warfare
- History of hand to hand combat
- History of invasion
- History of joint warfare
- History of maneuver warfare
- Siege warfare
- Total warfare
- Trench warfare
- History of unconventional warfare

=== History of military strategy ===
- History of economic warfare
- History of grand strategy
- History of operational warfare

== General military science and technology concepts ==
- Aircraft
  - Bomber
  - Fighter aircraft
- Aircraft carrier
- Air superiority
- Basic training
- Battlespace
- Defense
- Draft
- Exchange officer
- Maginot Line
- Militaria
- Military Aid to the Civil Power
- Military Aid to the Civil Community
- Military academy
- Military courtesy
- Military fiat
- Military history
- Military incompetence
- Military logistics
- Junta
- Military organization
- Military rule (disambiguation)
- Military science
- Military tactics
- Military technology and equipment
- Mutually assured destruction (MAD)
- Napalm
- Nuclear missile
  - SLBM
  - ICBM
  - MIRV
  - Tactical nuclear weapon
- Radar
- Recruiting
- Sonar
- Strategic Bombing
- Troop density
- War crime (list)
  - Crimes against humanity
  - Genocide
  - Mass murder
  - War rape

== Influential military strategists ==
Following are examples from throughout history of prominently influential military strategists:

- Cyrus the Great
- Sun Tzu – Chinese military general, strategist, and philosopher during the Zhou dynasty's Spring and Autumn period. He is traditionally credited as the author of The Art of War, an extremely influential ancient Chinese book on military strategy.
- Sun Bin
- Chanakya
- Alexander the Great
- Chandragupta Maurya
- Hannibal
- Qin Shi Huang
- Julius Caesar
- Marcus Vipsanius Agrippa
- Zhuge Liang
- Khalid ibn al-Walid
- Genghis Khan
- Gustavus Adolphus of Sweden
- Frederick the Great
- Napoleon Bonaparte
- Arthur Wellesley, 1st Duke of Wellington
- Gebhard Leberecht von Blücher
- Antoine-Henri Jomini
- Nathan Bedford Forrest
- Carl von Clausewitz – German-Prussian soldier and military theorist who stressed the psychological and political aspects of war. His ideas have been widely influential in military theory and have had a strong influence on German military thought specifically.
- Robert E. Lee
- Ulysses S. Grant
- William Tecumseh Sherman
- Helmuth von Moltke the Elder
- Alfred von Schlieffen
- Hans Delbrück
- Alfred Thayer Mahan
- Ferdinand Foch
- Giulio Douhet
- Billy Mitchell
- J. F. C. Fuller
- B. H. Liddell Hart
- Hans von Seeckt
- Heinz Guderian
- Erwin Rommel
- Alan Brooke, 1st Viscount Alanbrooke
- Bernard Montgomery, 1st Viscount Montgomery of Alamein
- George Marshall
- Dean Acheson

== Military science and technology lists ==
- List of countries by military expenditures
- List of countries by number of active troops
- List of countries by size of armed forces
- List of countries without an army
- List of air forces
- List of navies
- Lists of armies
- List of battles

== See also ==
- Outline of war
- Military science fiction
