= Troop density =

Statistical value in military science

A troop density (Russian: Плотность войск) also known as the dispersion factor in military science is a statistical value assigned by commanders during the combat operations process in considering the ability of the combat arms to achieve military objectives during a military operation. It reflects combat readiness of the units to participate in engagements with consideration to the terrain and expected enemy strength.

The unit of measurement is square metres per soldier, although this is modified for each combat arm to reflect their primary weapon performance in combat as weapon density (Russian: Плотность оружия); for example guns for artillery. Troop density is also used to estimate forces required to occupy a given populated territory to deny this population to being exploited by the enemy covert forces or insurgent troops. Troop density is affected by different variables such as the number of a state’s residents. Various case studies, for example, show that the average troop density is 10.76 soldiers per 1,000 population. In combatting insurgency, the accepted standard, which was recommended by James Quinlivan, is a ratio of 20 to 25 counterinsurgents per 1,000 residents. The concept of defining the number of troops per population is also known as force density.

The troop density has decreased through military history in proportion to the increase in lethality of weapons being use in combat. However, there is no accepted standard to calculate this value due to the large number of variables involved in the planning of combat operations.

Military history can be divided into three periods according to average troop density employed in combat: ancient armies with about 10 square metres per foot soldier, the age of close order formation armed with firearms encompassing the period from the 1650s to the Franco-Prussian War of 1871 that increased the average to 250 square meters per infantryman, and the Second World War when the density decreased to 27,500 square metres per infantryman. The Soviet Army has based much of its post-war doctrine on the war experience, and had devoted considerable resources to the analysis of troop density, including these in almost all considerations of wartime operations. By the end of the Cold War the density (in Europe) was estimated to be 50,000 square metres per infantryman due to widespread mechanisation of forces.

Troop density was included in the doctrine of the First World War belligerents, based on the battalion per forward zone front calculation. The density of troops also affects the planning of close air support operations because of the higher rate of missions required to deliver adequate munitions to their targets. The increased dispersal of troops was the consideration behind the decision to develop nuclear bombs before effects of radiation were realised.

The physical density of troops in the area of combat is not reflective of the average value for any given command because dispersion of troops tends to follow terrain and tactical considerations of the combat planning, and actual location of troops tends to be in clusters of positions. Low troop density is a particular problem as a period of vulnerability during air assault, air landing, amphibious assault and to some extent airborne assault operations, as well as during pre-combat concentration of troops in the staging area prior to their movement to the battle area, denying them operational mobility.

== See also ==
- Throw-weight
