= Technical intelligence =

Information about the weapons and technological capabilities of a foreign adversary

Technical intelligence (TECHINT) is intelligence about weapons and equipment used by the armed forces of foreign nations. The related term, scientific and technical intelligence, addresses information collected or analyzed about the broad range of foreign science, technology, and weapon systems.

== Technical intelligence ==
Technical intelligence is intended primarily to counter technological surprise. Knowledge of the characteristics and capabilities of enemy weapons allows nations to develop effective countermeasures for them. Occasionally, armed forces adopt technology developed by foreign nations. The jerrycan of World War II is an example of foreign equipment adopted by the US Army. Technical intelligence should not be confused with intelligence obtained "by technical means". That is a term of art used in discussion of disarmament to mean information gathered by various sorts of cameras, sensors, or other devices. Technical intelligence is the product: "technical intelligence—Intelligence derived from the collection, processing, analysis, and exploitation of data and information pertaining to foreign equipment and materiel for the purposes of preventing technological surprise, assessing foreign scientific and technical capabilities, and developing countermeasures designed to neutralize an adversary's technological advantages."

== Scientific and technical intelligence ==
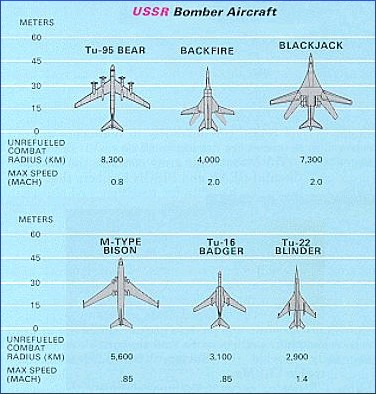
Soviet Bombers

Scientific and technical intelligence (S&TI) is "the (All-source intelligence) analysis and production resulting from the collection, evaluation, analysis, and interpretation of foreign scientific and technical information that covers:

- Foreign developments in basic and applied research and in applied engineering techniques;
- Scientific and technical characteristics, capabilities, and limitations of foreign military systems, weapons, weapon systems, and materiel; the research and development related thereto; and the production methods employed for their manufacture."

S&TI covers not just the equipment, but the process by which it was developed and produced, the production rate of the country or organization making it, and possibly the economic and other priorities given to the project.

== Technical intelligence process ==
The production of technical intelligence is a specialized intelligence art used to meet the needs of the armed forces and national intelligence consumers. A multiservice manual describes U.S. military doctrine for TECHINT. The technical intelligence process is divided into three areas—collection, exploitation and production.

=== Collection of materiel and related documents ===
Chance plays an important part in the collection of foreign weapons and equipment. The collection phase typically begins when a soldier finds something interesting on a battlefield or a defecting pilot flies an aircraft to a friendly country. In a famous case, Viktor Ivanovich Belenko flew a Soviet Mig 25 "Foxbat" to Hakodate, Japan on 6 September 1976. The United States granted Belenko asylum and assisted in the dismantling of the aircraft so that it could be crated for return to the Soviet Union.

Procedures have been established for development of scientific and technical intelligence requirements, i.e. wish lists, to guide systematic collection efforts. Materiel required may be obtained through any number of channels. For example, materiel may be obtained through commercial channels.

An attache might ask a foreign official for information about a piece of foreign equipment. Clandestine operations have been mounted to obtain critical enemy materiel. Probably the most expensive and most ambitious was the construction of Hughes Glomar Explorer by the Central Intelligence Agency to obtain the wreckage of Soviet submarine that sunk in the Pacific.

=== Exploitation (testing and analysis) ===
The exploitation phase includes various types of technical and operational tests. The services have well-developed procedures for testing various types of materiel. Testing often includes operating the item and non-destructive testing. The Air Force Historical Studies Office Web contains an excellent account of the exploitation of Axis aircraft during World War II.

=== Production of finished intelligence ===
The production of technical intelligence includes preparation of a variety of reports and documents. TECHINT documents include a wide range of materials from brief messages and reports prepared in the field to extensive formal studies prepared by teams of researchers. During World War II the Army prepared technical manuals on certain items of enemy equipment; included information about enemy equipment in catalogs of enemy equipment and in handbooks about foreign forces; and published technical intelligence in various reports.

== Historical examples of field technical intelligence ==
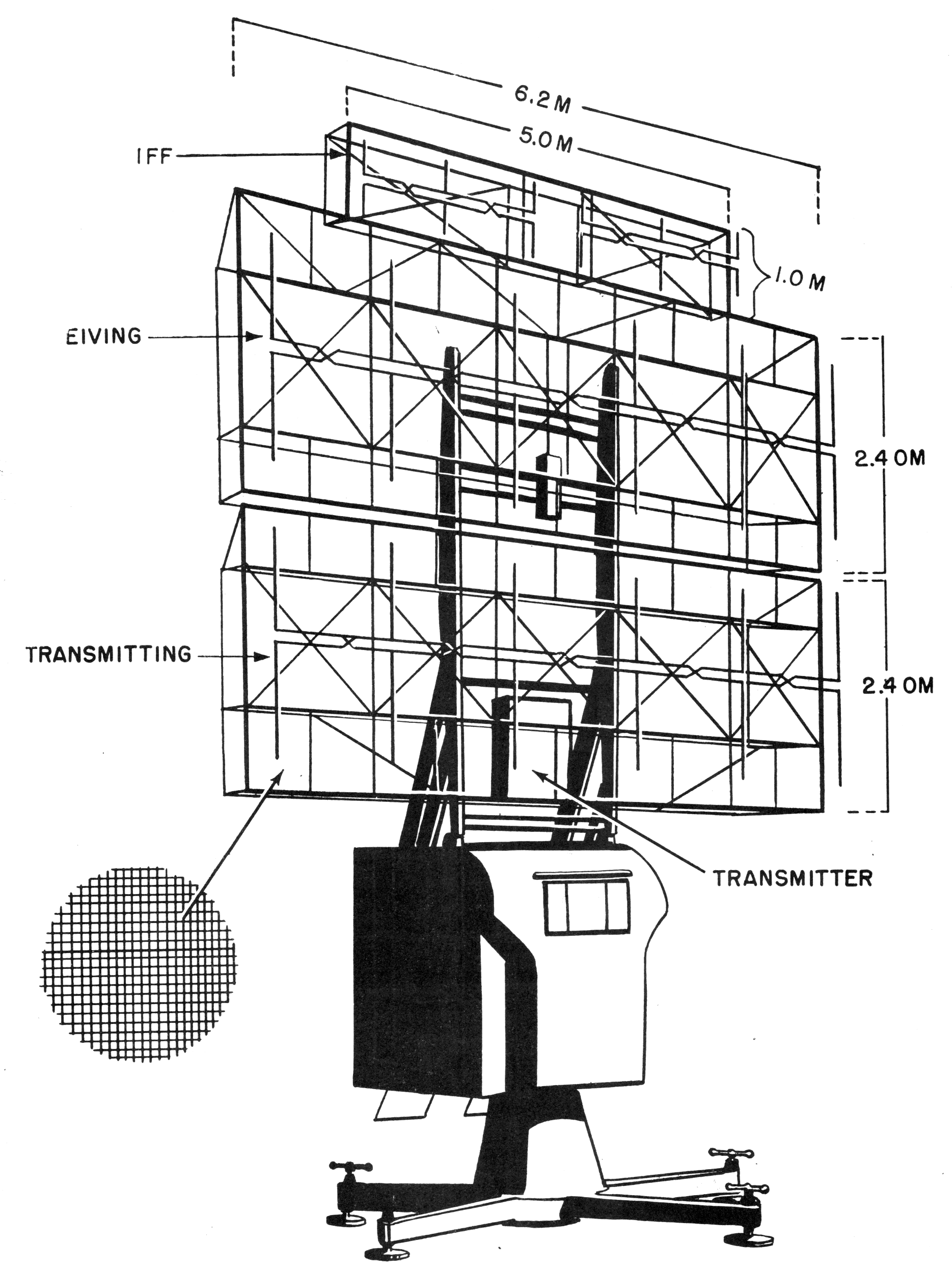
Limber Freya radar illustration

A well studied failure of technical intelligence occurred during the Battle of Osan, the first major engagement of the Korean War, when the American led Task Force Smith was deployed from Japan to confront the Korean People's Army's southward advance, their anti-tank capabilities were six obsolescent M9A1 Bazooka rocket launchers, two M20 recoilless rifles, two 4.2 inch mortars, four 60 mm mortars, and six 105 mm howitzers armed with 1,200 high explosive (HE) rounds. All of the weaponry was insufficient to penetrate the armor of the Soviet built T-34 tanks. This failure is directly attributed to the first U.S. casualty of the Korean war.

See Operation Biting for information on a British raid to capture German radar for technical evaluation. R.V. Jones was the leading World War II British expert on electronic warfare. He was one of the primary analysts of the Oslo Report.

US programs at the end of World War Two included Historical technical intelligence programs include Operation Paperclip, the general program directed at German scientists and engineers at the end of World War II. It is most often associated with rocket science.

Other contemporary efforts included Operation Alsos, focusing on nuclear science and engineering and Operation Lusty, devoted to aerodynamics.

== Use of enemy material in the field ==
Troops involved in technical intelligence operations have used knowledge of foreign material to put enemy equipment to use. For example, Army troops used German military telephone wire and medical supplies to aid civilians in France during World War II.

Similarly, Joseph E. Smith, who edited Small Arms of the World in the 1960s, reported that the U.S. Army captured a large supply of German mortar ammunition in France during World War II. It was discovered that the German ammunition could be fired from US mortars. Troops in the field prepared a firing table for the American mortar firing German ammunition by test firing the German ammunition.

== Collection techniques at the national level ==
In contrast with tactical technical intelligence, national level science and technology information tends to come less from capture of foreign equipment, and more from HUMINT or creative business relationships. There are some national-level attempts to salvage foreign equipment, such as Project Azorian, a complex and clandestine attempt to recover a sunken Soviet submarine.

== Scientific and technical espionage ==
The US Economic Espionage Act of 1996 criminalizes two kinds of activity, which may be done either by foreign powers for (18 U.S.C. § 1831–1839) makes the theft or misappropriation of a trade secret a federal crime. To some extent, the act addresses an international problem, but not all countries regard unauthorized technology transfer as illegal, when done for commercial purposes. Technology transfer that involves militarily critical technologies are more commonly a matter

This law contains two provisions criminalizing two sorts of activity:

- Theft of trade secrets to benefit foreign powers
- Theft of trade secrets for commercial purposes

Categorizing an individual act can be complex, as some national intelligence services have provided scientific and technical intelligence to private firms based in their countries. It becomes even more complex when the information is provided to an organization partially or fully owned by that government, and that organization competes in commercial markets. Other complexities arise when the information is not actually stolen, but where the foreign intelligence service (or business) buys one copy of a high-technology product, and then reverse engineers its technology to use in its own products. End user license agreements forbidding reverse engineering are common in software, but less so in other business areas.

Violation of export controls may overlap with information acquisition, or the exported equipment or materials may themselves be things difficult for the offending country to produce.

According to the US National Counterintelligence Executive (NCIX), 108 countries tried to obtain US technology in fiscal year 2005. Most of the effort, however, centered around a small number of countries. NCIX named China and Russia among this small number, "just as they have since the CI Community first began systematically tracking foreign technology collection efforts in 1997." By no means, however, is the US the only target, nor are China and Russia the only countries trying to obtain such information. In 2003, Sweden expelled two Russian diplomats over accusations of spying at Ericsson, a major electronics manufacturer whose products include avionics for Swedish Gripen fighter aircraft. Even more sensitive, however, is scientific and technical information-gathering by allies, such as Japan, France, and Israel.

=== Efficiency of espionage activities ===
Porteous raises a question of the efficiency of commercially oriented, economic, scientific and technical espionage. He observes that some claim intelligence obtained through economic espionage would be "tactically useless" for a number of reasons. Typically, the barriers to potential efficiency are related to an intelligence agency's lack of knowledge of the subject area and to problems associated with the dissemination of intelligence once acquired. These arguments tend to come from individuals who at the same time argue for or accept the need for government to defend against economic espionage engaged in by other governments. It is difficult to support these points simultaneously: if economic espionage is "tactically useless", it is similarly useless to foreign governments that practice it, and thus need not be defended against.

He counters the argument that "lack of direct knowledge of a certain business or its technology has been cited as a significant obstacle to intelligence services engaging in economic espionage. Yet during the Cold War, intelligence services spent significant amounts of time and energy, with some success, trying to obtain intelligence on various complex military technologies of which the case officers would not have had a profound knowledge. If intelligence services were trusted to obtain such information, a shift of focus to complex commercial technologies and intelligence would not be unthinkable. The same techniques used to obtain military secrets could be turned to complex commercial technologies or strategies without too much difficulty."

Another efficiency argument deals with the security of dissemination to industry. National characteristics will be different here; industry-government partnerships, for example, are far more routine in Japan than in the United States. US consortia have been open to foreign firms, and many have shut down, such as the Microelectronics and Computer Technology Corporation and the Corporation for Open Systems (in OSI and ISDN) networking. Some, such as the Open Software Foundation merged with other groups and wound up being international.

Porteous observed "the existence of means to reduce dissemination difficulties will not erase them. Problems will inevitably arise. Those countries considering engaging in or expanding their practice of economic espionage would be well-advised to consider the alleged experience of France in this area. It has recently been suggested that the embarrassing release of information indicating French intelligence service targeting of American companies, which triggered an American boycott of the Paris Airshow, was the work of disgruntled French firms. The companies responsible for releasing the material to the press apparently were unhappy with what they saw as the tendency of the French intelligence service, Direction générale de la sécurité extérieure (DGSE), to favour some French firms over others in distributing material obtained through economic espionage. The incident reportedly cooled relations between the DGSE and certain elements of French industry.

=== Espionage collection techniques ===
Perhaps most common are operations that exploit business relationships, including the marketing and sales phase. There are also efforts targeted at individuals with sensitive knowledge. The NCIX said the easiest techniques can be straightforward, including:

- Simply asking companies for "classified, sensitive, or export-controlled information. In some cases, a single would-be foreign buyer sent out multiple requests to a variety of US companies, searching for a seller willing to ignore or bend export-licensing requirements."
- Joint ventures, perhaps not even on the target technology, but to bring intelligence collectors in contact with people or facilities with sensitive information. Offshoring work from the country with the technology, to other countries where protection may be more difficult, is another approach.
- Offering support services to facilities or contractors with sensitive information. These can include technical support services such as assembly and testing, but also services as mundane as trash collection, hoping the trash may contain information inadequately shredded or otherwise destroyed. Even outsourced administrative services, such as payroll, can give clues to which individuals might be targets for approaches.
- Conventions and trade shows, of course, offer information. It can be quite easy to enter a show for the "industry only", although more difficult if the event requires a verified security clearance.
- Use of spyware or other malicious hacking techniques to penetrate information systems.

Another category starts with agreements of which the hosting government is fully aware, but that may be enforced more or less stringently in specific cases: "Since the mid-1980s, development, production, and marketing of weapon systems has been increasingly internationalized through government-sponsored cooperative development programs and various kinds of industrial linkages, including international subcontracting and teaming arrangements, joint ventures, and cross-border mergers and acquisitions. Foreign companies have acquired many U.S. defense companies and have legitimate business interests in them. The U.S. government allows such foreign investment as long as it is consistent with U.S. national security interests."

Multinational programs may be even more common in Europe, such as Panavia (UK-Germany-Italy) and Airbus (Germany-France-Spain, but operating under Dutch law). There are also enterprises owned by a combination of industry and government, such as the French Thales Group.

Foreign intelligence services, or foreign companies, may still try to recruit individuals.

=== Relation to economic intelligence ===
Given that scientific and technical information is an important part of a nation's competitive position in world markets, scientific and technical intelligence blurs into "economic intelligence", which is defined by the U.S. government as "government-sponsored or coordinated intelligence activity designed to unlawfully and covertly obtain classified data and/or sensitive policy or proprietary information from a U.S. Government agency or company, potentially having the effect of enhancing a foreign country's economic competitiveness and damaging U.S. economic security." Convicted CIA spy Aldrich Ames collected $4.6 million for selling classified information, on CIA activities, to the USSR and Russia. In contrast to the sale of government information, "Ronald Hoffman, a project manager for a company called Science Applications, Inc., made $750,000 by selling complex software programs that were developed under secret contract for the Strategic Defense Initiative (SDI). The CONTAM software tracks the plumes that rockets and missiles leave in their wake and, therefore, has both military and civilian applications. Hoffman sold his wares to Japanese multinationals-Nissan Motor Company, Mitsubishi Electric, Mitsubishi Heavy Industries, and Ishikawajima-Harima Heavy Industries – that wanted the information for civilian aerospace programs. He was arrested in 1992." Porteous identifies two kinds of economic intelligence that are distinct from S&TI:

- trade negotiation intelligence
- macro-economic intelligence

=== Espionage examples at the national level ===
Nations often claim that each is trying to get economically significant scientific and technical information to file counterclaims of each spying on the other. One conflict comes from the fact that some normal business practices in other countries are considered illegal by the United States.

Nations have different views of what constitutes offensive and defensive economic intelligence: "Decisions informed by the provision of economic intelligence range from determining whether to raise interest rates to the proper stance to take in contentious trade negotiations. This type of intelligence support to government decision-makers is generally accepted as a legitimate function of state intelligence services. Related intelligence services that go beyond the mere collection of information and aim to influence events directly, either at a macro-economic or firm level, are understandably more controversial.

Citing a US example, Porteous describes a useful distinction: "... the CIA recently distinguished between

- intelligence used to inform government policy-makers and
- intelligence used to influence events at the firm level,

to differentiate their economic intelligence activities in France from the direct industry-support activities in which French intelligence had engaged in the USA."

He cites the former category, intending to inform government officials, as where the CIA was allegedly supporting the formulation of American trade policy with regard to negotiations concerning audio-visual matters at the GATT. This was reportedly done through the provision of clandestinely obtained intelligence on the French bargaining position. The Americans argued that this support to government decision-makers was well within the bounds of tolerable espionage behaviour...." The Americans contrasted this with :alleged French intelligence activities in support of French commercial actors through directly transmitting clandestinely obtained proprietary information from American companies was not.

In 1994, Porteous suggested that there may be a shift in the countries most eager to engage in this sort of intelligence gathering. "Early on, the French and the Russians were presented in most North American analyses as the primary practitioners of economic espionage. Now, in a realignment perhaps more attuned to today's geopolitical realities, this dubious status is being transferred to the Japanese and emerging Asian economies. In a recent article in the Far Eastern Economic Review, FBI officials stated 57 countries are running operations to obtain information out of Silicon Valley. These same officials were quoted as labelling Asian governments and multinationals, particularly Japan, Taiwan and South Korea, as the chief culprits."

There are differences in economic culture between Europe and Asia. Where European industry-government partnerships tend to be very formally defined, the Asian ones are more fluid. "The prospect of huge Asian multinational corporations, with their definite but elusive relationship with government, engaging in industrial or economic espionage, may open new debates on when and how intelligence services should intervene in these cases. For while European states move towards privatization (albeit retaining a "golden share") in many cases there is little sign of a lessening of links between business and government in the high growth communitarian societies of Asia. The imminent emergence of powerful Chinese multinationals out of the so-called "socialist market economy" of China will only increase this trend."

It can reasonably be surmised that there is a degree of economic intelligence gathering among most or all industrialized nations. Merely because a country, in the list below, complains of intelligence gathering against it should not be interpreted as meaning that country's intelligence service does not collect information from other countries.

==== Canada ====
Porteous mentions that in Montreal, two members of the Stasi, the former East German secret police, explained how they used phony work records from "sympathetic companies" to gain employment at targeted Canadian companies.

He speculated, in 1993, "In the near future, it is conceivable that the UK would share more economic intelligence with fellow EC members than it would with Canada or the United States. On the other hand, the USA would be more likely to share its economic intelligence with its fellow FTA and NAFTA members."

While there has been no official Canadian statement about targeting scientific, technical and economic intelligence, the Communications Security Establishment (CSE), the Canadian SIGINT agency, advertised for "university graduates for analyst positions noting that "graduation in fields such as economics, international business, commerce ... would be an asset"."

==== China ====
"China has also warned its people about foreigners seeking economic intelligence. (In this instance the Chinese government felt 1000-year-old remedies and ancient healing techniques required protection.)"

==== France ====
France and the US have accused one another of economic, scientific and technical espionage at the national level. A US senator, William Cohen, accused the French of hiding listening devices on Air France flights in order to pick up useful economic information from business travelers."In 1993, the CIA warned U.S. aircraft manufacturers to be on the lookout for French spies at the Paris Air Show, and intelligence officials have claimed that France regularly sponsors the theft of information from U.S. companies.".

France declared several US intelligence officers persona non grata for alleged US economic intelligence-gathering, although Knight stated the US denied the charges.

France, according to Russell, also is a target. The French former intelligence official, Alexandre de Marenches described the Japanese as experts in economic espionage; that the Japanese government and industry have close ties with each other. The French intelligence agency, Direction générale de la sécurité extérieure (DGSE), studies Japanese intelligence operations abroad, trying to determine Japan's next technology target. According to de Marenches, Japan examines the global production situation, determines which country can satisfy their high- technology requirement, and then dispatches a collection delegation.

==== Germany ====
"German articles talk of American or French use of signals intelligence (SIGINT) capacity to eavesdrop on sensitive commercial transactions."

==== Israel ====
Several sources describe Israel as having energetic programs in economic and S&TI. According to a Command and General Staff College thesis, Israeli Air Force intelligence tried to steal 14 boxes of corporate data from Recon/Optical, Inc., a company that develops optics and semiconductors used in reconnaissance satellites. "Data the agents removed successfully, before their arrest, went to the laboratories of the Israeli company Electro-Optics Industries. The Government of Israel continues efforts to field a reconnaissance satellite with the services of a prime contractor—Electro-OpticsIndustries."

==== Japan ====
"In the early 1980s, the companies Hitachi and Fujitsu, and the government agency the Ministry for International Trade and Industry (MITI) were caught stealing corporate secrets from IBM, Cray, and Fairchild Semiconductors. A 1987 Central Intelligence Agency (CIA) report "concluded that 80 percent of all Japanese government intelligence assets were directed toward the United States and Western Europe and concentrated on acquiring secrets about... technological developments."

As of 1994, "Japan operates its economic collection bureaucracy in a manner different from France. The Japanese government itself does not provide large amounts of intelligence to its corporations. Companies maintain their own extensive intelligence gathering assets. Instead, the Japanese government provides direction and money; it also collates the information provided to it by companies. Government agencies, the Ministry for International Trade and Industry (MITI) and the Japanese External Trade Organization (JETRO), coordinate national economic collection priorities, provide access to foreign countries (through trade offices), and channel the intelligence they do collect to the appropriate industry. JETRO operates 77 offices in 59 countries; its agents collect economic and technical information and forward it to MITI. According to Japan: 2000, a report commissioned by the CIA, "Japan's elaborate system for political and economic intelligence is conducted through the various trading companies down to the office level.""

==== Republic of Korea (South Korea) ====
"South Korea's equivalent of the CIA, the National Security Planning Agency, places operatives in Korean companies like Hyundai, Samsung, and the Lucky Group. The companies then post the agents to foreign countries to forge close contacts with their industrial counterparts to gather technical and financial information."

==== Former Soviet Union and Russia ====
"To address the lag in technology, Soviet authorities in 1970 reconstituted and invigorated the USSR's intelligence collection for science and technology. The Council of Ministers and the Central Committee established a new unit, Directorate T of the KGB's First Chief Directorate, to plumb the R&D programs of Western economies. The State Committee on Science and Technology and the Military-Industrial Commission were to provide Directorate T and its operating arm, called Line X, with collection requirements. Military Intelligence (GRU), the Soviet Academy of Sciences, and the State Committee for External Relations completed the list of participants. The bulk of collection was to be done by the KGB and the GRU, with extensive support from the East European intelligence services e.g. in Poland Departament I MSW – Wydział Naukowo-Techniczny. A formidable apparatus was set up for scientific espionage; the scale of this structure testified to its importance. The coming of détente provided access for Line X and opened new avenues for exploitation."

"In June of 1994, Russian presidential aide Yuriy Baturin accused Asian countries, particularly China and North Korea, of economic espionage."

==== United Kingdom ====
Reuter's stories from Britain make similar claims involving a middle-eastern power and a multibillion-dollar arms deal the UK was bidding on.

"The concept of "economic well-being" used above is also found in the British Intelligence Services Act, 1994. The act discloses for the first time the functions of the British Secret Intelligence Service (SIS) and Government Communications Headquarters (GCHQ) with regard to the economic and commercial interests of the state. According to the Act, under the authority of the Secretary of State, the functions of SIS include obtaining and providing information as well as performing "other tasks" relating to the actions or intentions of "persons outside the British Isles". These functions of SIS, like those of GCHQ, are to be exercised only in the interests of national security, prevention or detection of serious crime and, most importantly from the point of view of this article, "in the interests of the economic well-being of the UK"."

==== United States ====
The United States suffers from a degree of conflict, in that it is sensitive to economic espionage against US companies, but it also objects to those companies using business practices, routine in other countries, that are considered corrupt domestically. "The United States is the only member of the Organisation for Economic Co-operation and Development (OECD) to pass legislation — the Foreign Corrupt Practices Act — criminalizing the payment of a bribe to a foreign official. The legislation arose out of the American bribery scandals of the 1970s. These restraints, which are extraterritorial in scope, have proven a constant irritant to Americans doing business abroad. According to Secretary of State Warren Christopher, the legislation costs American companies "hundreds of millions of dollars in contracts every year". The USA is particularly upset about the practice engaged in by some countries of not only turning a blind eye to bribery by their own nationals but recognizing these same bribes as tax-deductible business expenses. The Clinton administration has not been encouraged by progress in lobbying fellow OECD members to pass domestic legislation mirroring America's, or to agree to an enforceable international code condemning the practice. In the absence of any international support for these initiatives, American commercial interests have been pressuring their government either to change the international regime or to rescind the legislation. "Unwilling to rescind, the Clinton administration turned to the CIA."

Former Director of Central Intelligence James Woolsey distinguished between what is licit for the US government and illicit for companies: "I... reserve the term industrial espionage to mean espionage for the direct benefit of an industry. ... I don't call it industrial espionage if the United States spies on a European corporation to find out if it is bribing its way to contracts in Asia or Latin America that it can't win honestly.""

===== Statements of current and past US officials about economic intelligence collection =====
"Former United States Central Intelligence Agency director James Woolsey confirmed in Washington... that the US steals economic secrets "with espionage, with communications [intelligence], with reconnaissance satellites", and that there was now "some increased emphasis" on economic intelligence. He claimed that economic spying was justified because European companies had a "national culture" of bribery and were the "principle offenders from the point of view of paying bribes in major international contracts in the world".

Responding to the European Parliament report on interception capabilities and the Echelon satellite surveillance system, Woolsey said that the "Interception Capabilities 2000" report which had been presented to the parliament's Citizens' Rights Committee on 23 February, was "intellectually honest". In two cases cited in the report, "the fact [is] that the subject of American intelligence collection was bribery."

"That's correct", he told a packed audience of foreign press journalists...We have spied on that in the past. I hope... that the United States government continues to spy on bribery." Woolsey continued, "Whether economic or military, most US intelligence data came from open sources, he said. But "five percent is essentially secrets that we steal. We steal secrets with espionage, with communications, with reconnaissance satellites."

Explaining his view that Europe was the main centre of world industrial bribery, he asked "Why... have we in the past from time to time targeted foreign corporations and government assistance to them?... Some of our oldest friends and allies have a national culture and a national practice such that bribery is an important part of the way they try to do business in international commerce.... The part of the world that where this culture of getting contracts through bribery, that actually has a great deal of money, and is active in international contracting is to a first approximation Europe".

"[...] The principal offenders, from the point of view of paying bribes in major international contracts in the world, are Europe. And indeed, they are some of the very same companies – the companies are in some of the very same countries where the most recent flap has arisen about alleged American industrial espionage."

Woolsey, when newly Director of Central Intelligence in 1993, publicly announced that economic intelligence was now a CIA program. French intelligence had been aggressively going after information from American executives. Woolsey said "No more Mr. Nice Guy."

In a statement in 1995 entitled "A National Security Strategy of Engagement and Enlargement", President Bill Clinton detailed just what his administration expected from American intelligence with regard to protecting or pursuing American economic interests

To adequately forecast dangers to democracy and to U.S. economic well-being, the intelligence community must track political, economic, social and military developments in those parts of the world where U.S. interests are most heavily engaged and where overt collection of information from open sources is inadequate. Economic intelligence will play an increasingly important role in helping policy-makers understand economic trends. Economic intelligence can support U.S. trade negotiators and help level the economic playing field by identifying threats to U.S. companies from foreign intelligence services and unfair trading practices.

===== Expert inference about economic intelligence collection by the US =====
According to Porteous, [Clinton's] statement clearly envisages the use of clandestine methods to obtain this intelligence where "overt collection... from open sources is inadequate".

Russell observes "France and Japan provide illustrative examples of foreign governments' actions.

"It is this direct link between government and business that some individuals propose to establish between the U.S.Government and U.S. businesses. Anticipated rewards of such a relationship include: reduced product research and development (R&D) timelines, reduced R&D costs, accelerated time from R&D to product marketing, and the receipt of lucrative contracts by undercutting a competitor using inside knowledge of his bid and terms. In sum, any benefit gained in these areas has the potential to increase profits."

== See also ==
- All-source intelligence
- Basic intelligence
- Geospatial intelligence
- Technology transfer
