= National Operational Intelligence Watch Officer's Network =

Secure telephone conference call system in US

The National Operational Intelligence Watch Officer's Network (NOIWON) is a secure telephone conference-call system between major Washington national security watch centers:

- National Military Command Center
- National Military Joint Intelligence Center
- State Department Operations Center
- State Department Bureau of Intelligence and Research
- CIA Operations Center
- NSA Operations Center
- The White House Situation Room
- U.S. Navy Multiple Threat Alert Center

It is used for rapid evaluation of breaking crises.
