= Basic intelligence =

Basic intelligence is fundamental or factual information about a foreign country, organization or issue that is collected and produced in intelligence reports by an intelligence organization. In the U.S. Intelligence Community, the CIA World Factbook is the best known basic intelligence publication. The U.S. Department of Defense uses the term "General Military Intelligence" for military basic intelligence.

== Definition and purpose ==
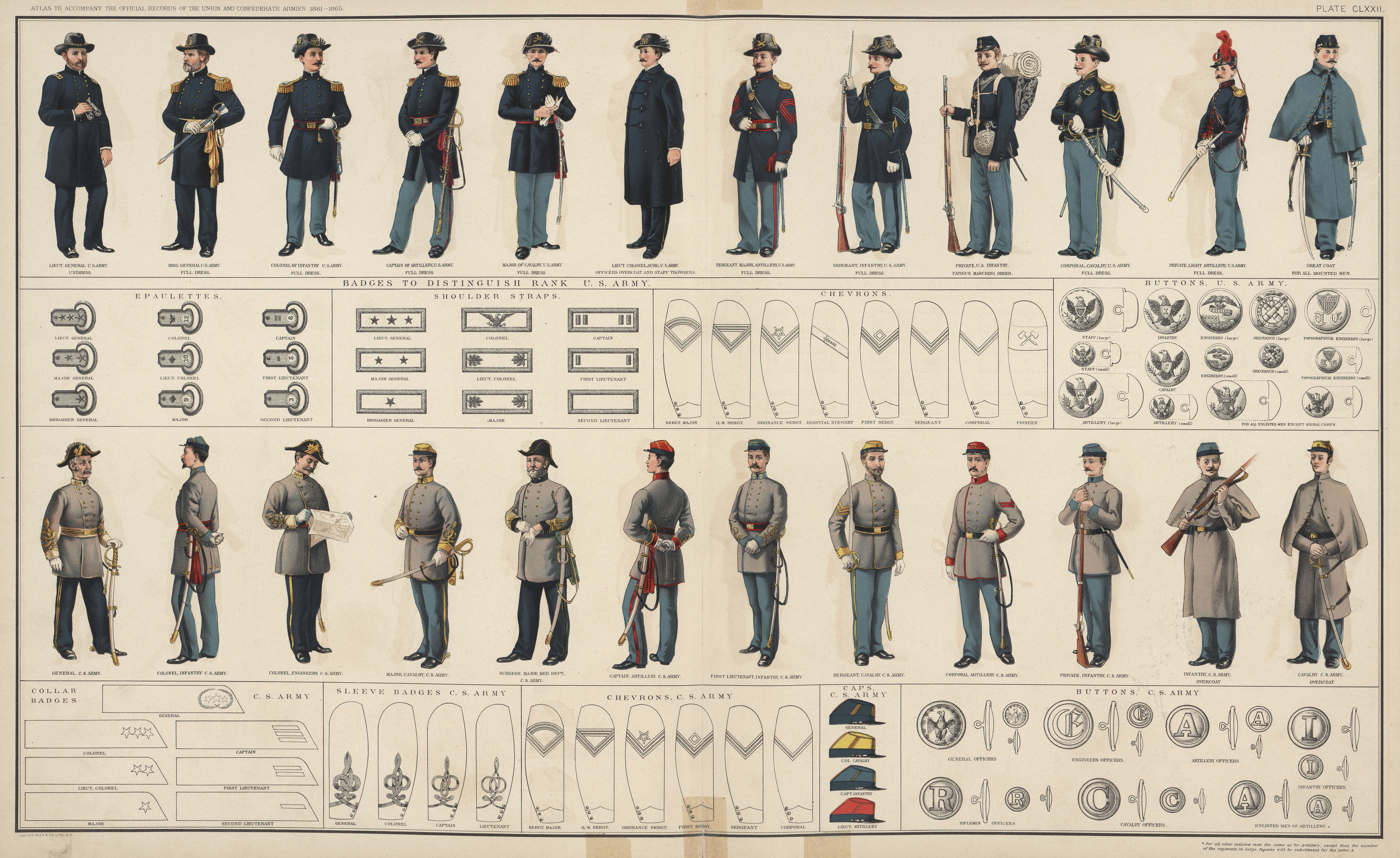
Civil War Uniforms, 1895

Basic intelligence refers to reference documents that are produced by an intelligence organization about a foreign country, organization or issue by an intelligence organization. It contains information that is likely to be needed by many consumers for many purposes. Basic intelligence is one of the older intelligence types and predates the formal definition. It is encyclopedic in nature as opposed to being estimative or technical intelligence analysis. It is organized so that it can be readily used, such as country studies, wall charts of organizational structure, military capabilities, or country databases. Basic intelligence needs to be comprehensive, systematically organized, and updated periodically to account for changes. Consumers of basic intelligence include policy makers, the military and often authors of other intelligence types that require fundamental intelligence to make their assessments. Unclassified basic intelligence, such the CIA Factbook, is often used by the general public as reference material about foreign countries. Classified basic intelligence goes beyond what is available in the unclassified information and includes information about relationships with other countries or details about military capabilities that are not available in open-source intelligence.

"Basic intelligence" is also used as an adjective to describe introductory intelligence courses.

== United Kingdom definition ==
The United Kingdom's definition of basic intelligence is: "Basic intelligence is defined as intelligence on any subject that may be used as reference material for planning and as a basis for processing subsequent information or intelligence (from Allied Administrative Publication). Basic intelligence includes details of orders of battle, equipment capabilities, personalities, infrastructure, socio-political, economic and environmental aspects. We derive basic intelligence through routine monitoring or on a contingency basis. Some UK intelligence agencies use the term ‘building-block intelligence’ when referring to basic intelligence."

== NATO definition ==
The NATO definition of basic intelligence is "Intelligence, derived from any source, that may be used as reference material for planning and as a basis for processing subsequent information or intelligence."

== U.S. DoD definition ==
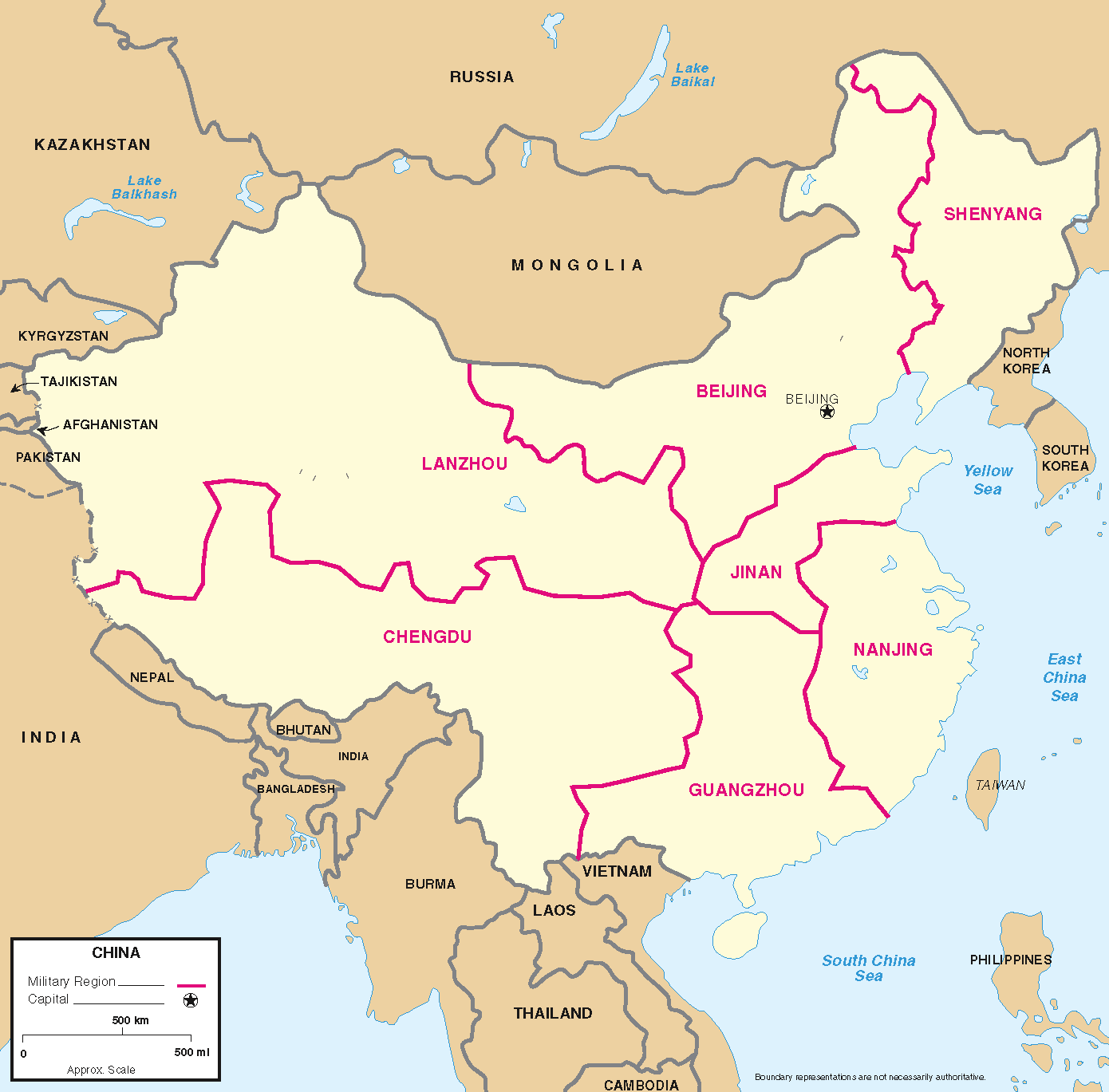
Example of Basic intelligence: Chinese Military Regions

General Military Intelligence is basic intelligence of a military nature. The U.S. Department of Defense defines General Military Intelligence as: "Intelligence concerning the (1) military capabilities of foreign countries or organizations or (2) topics affecting potential US or multinational military operations, relating to the following subj: armed forces capabilities, including order of battle, organization, training, tactics, doctrine, strategy, and other factors bearing on military strength and effectiveness; area and terrain intelligence, including urban areas, coasts and landing beaches, and meteorological, oceanographic, and geological intelligence; transportation in all modes; military materiel production and support industries; military and civilian communications systems; military economics, including foreign military assistance; insurgency and terrorism; military political-sociological intelligence; location, identification, and description of military related installations; government control; escape and evasion; and threats and forecasts. (Excludes scientific and technical intelligence.)"

== Examples ==
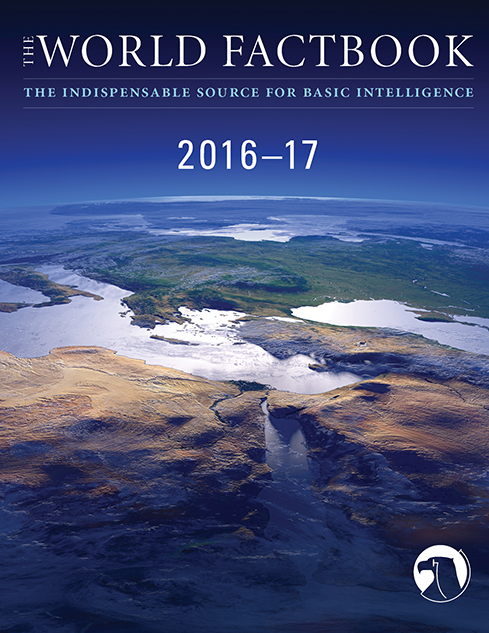
CIA World Factbook 2016-17 Cover

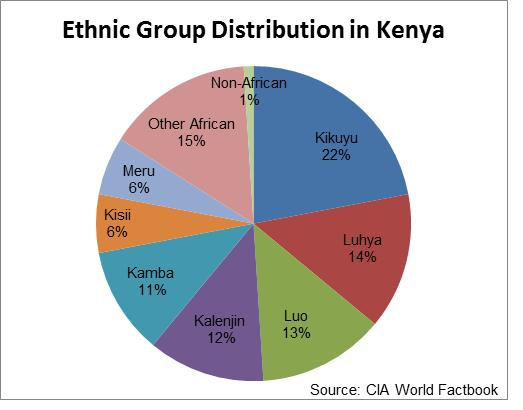
CIA Factbook Ethnic Distribution in Kenya

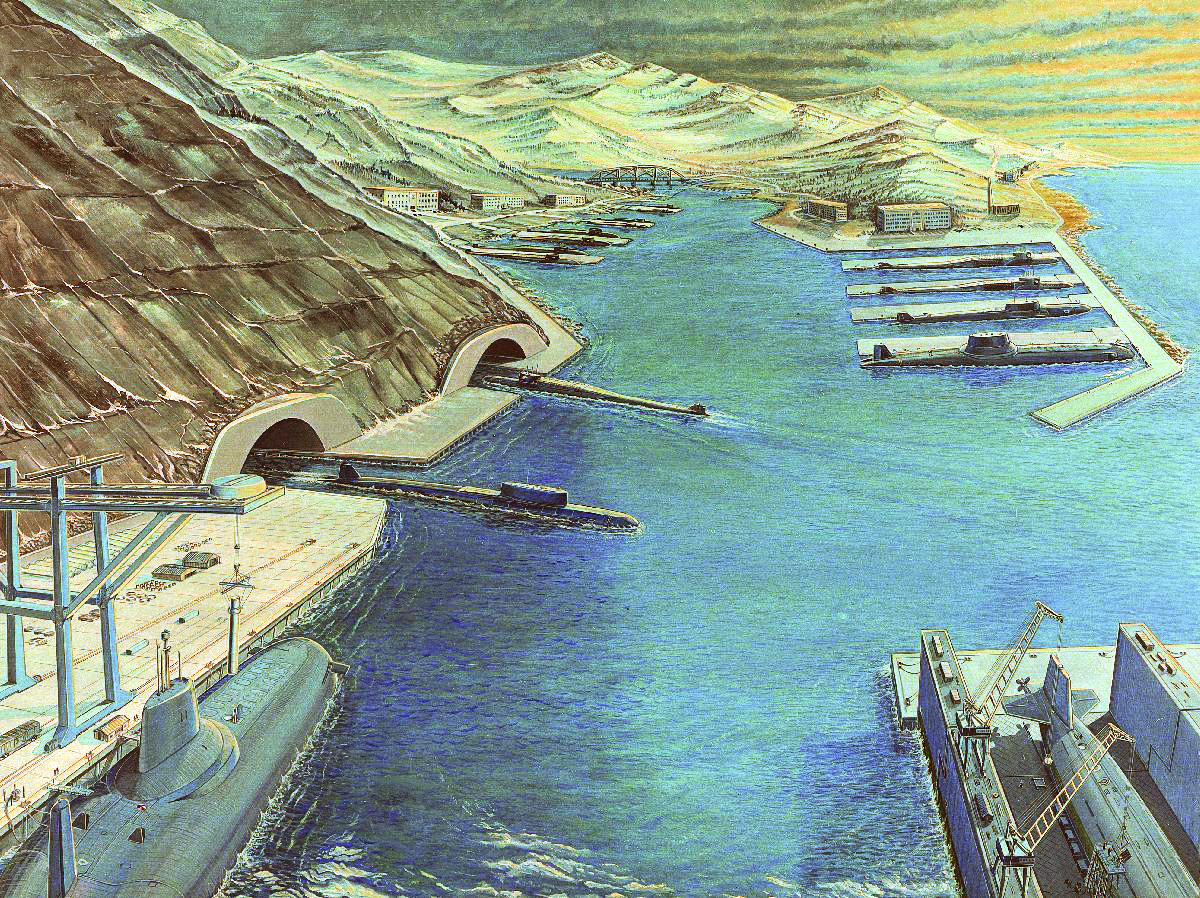
Soviet Ballistic submarine base, from Soviet Military Power

- CIA World Factbook
- Soviet Military Power
- Joint Army Navy Intelligence Studies (JANIS)
- National Intelligence Survey
- Modernized Integrated Database (U.S. DoD General Military Intelligence Database)
- Military Capabilities Study (MCS)
- Maps
- Wall Charts
- Graphs and tables
- Country Studies

== Other types of intelligence ==
Other types of intelligence analysis include current intelligence, estimative intelligence, scientific and technical intelligence, counterintelligence, biographic intelligence, medical intelligence, domestic intelligence, and economic intelligence.
