= US Army Regulation 25-50 =

US Army regulation

The Army Regulation (AR) 25-50 Preparing and Managing Correspondence is the United States Army's administrative regulation that "establishes three forms of correspondence authorized for use within the Army: a letter, a memorandum, and a message."

== Style Manuals ==
APD uses the following references and style manuals:

- Government Printing Office Style Manual - 2016 Edition
- Chicago Manual of Style - 16th Edition

== Microsoft Word Templates ==
APD prepared templates for use in Microsoft Word 97 for members of the Department of the Army.

There are a number of other templates and documents purporting to be templates on the Army's milSuite collaboration site. This page provides a scaffolding for other users to publish Microsoft Word templates.

== See also ==
- Army Regulation 381-12 (U)
- United States Army Publishing Directorate
