= Counterintelligence failures =

Countries with major counterintelligence failures are presented alphabetically. In each case, there is at least one systemic problem with seeking penetration agents when few or none may actually have existed, to the detriment of the functioning of the national service involved.

Many of the individuals named have separate articles in Wikipedia. The emphasis here is on both national-level counterespionage problems, and how the individuals eluded detection.

== Russian and Soviet counterespionage failures ==
The Czarist Russia had a secret police before the Soviet Union, and modern Russia still has intelligence services that may have been impacted by events during the Soviet period.

While there were penetration accusations after the 1917 Bolshevik Revolution, the great mass of large-scale accusations and purges, after Stalin consolidated power but before WWII, tend to blur into the Great Terror. After Stalin's death, Lavrenti Beria, heading state security, attempted to gain control, but was shot and his subordinates purged.

=== Oleg Penkovsky ===
Oleg Penkovsky was a UK-US defector in place, in an extremely key position in the Soviet system. His position was such that he not only was able to provide information about what the Soviets had learned about the West, but also about the real capabilities of the Soviets. A book, The Penkovsky Papers, was prepared, posthumously, with assistance from US intelligence. A 1976 Senate commission stated that "the book was prepared and written by witting agency assets who drew on actual case materials." Much of the material provided by Penkovsky has been declassified.

=== Vladimir Vetrov ===
One example of counter-intelligence in action involves the case of Soviet defector Vladimir Vetrov, codenamed "Farewell," who gave several classified documents in 1981 to French Intelligence detailing industrial espionage committed by the Soviet Union in various western nations in a collection called the Farewell Dossier. The information was passed on to the Central Intelligence Agency, who exploited it by secretly preparing sabotaged "intelligence" for Soviet spies to collect. After the Soviet's incorporated the flawed industrial technology, it caused numerous technical failures in the USSR including a massive oil pipeline explosion which damaged the economy.

== UK counterespionage failures ==
A group of Soviet sympathizers, in respected positions in British society, formed the Cambridge Five, sometimes called the Cambridge Four, and it has never been established how many active agents were involved. Of these, the most devastating was Kim Philby. Other confirmed members included Donald Duart Maclean, Guy Burgess, and Anthony Blunt. See Cambridge Five for other suspects.

Kim Philby was an effective Soviet agent while in the British counterintelligence service, warning the Soviets of countersurveillance, while casting suspicion on loyal officers. Philby came under suspicion but was able to escape to the USSR. Philby even was, at one time, considered as a possible head of MI5. He was able to protect numerous Soviet operations in Britain.

British intelligence also suffered from internal suspicion that may or may not have been directed at the right targets, but caused suspicion to be thrown at the highest counter-intelligence officers, with severe effects on morale. Peter Wright, while later extremely controversial about revelations his 1987 book, Spycatcher: The Candid Autobiography of a Senior Intelligence Officer, also developed techniques that allowed the UK to track numerous Soviet clandestine agents, and agents under diplomatic cover.

== US counterespionage failures ==
James Jesus Angleton, the legendary CIA director of counterespionage and a poet himself, used T. S. Eliot's term "an infinity of mirrors" to describe the intricacies of agent to double agent to triple agent so common in counterespionage, with works describing him as paranoid, while others described him as brilliant. Perhaps the truth may only emerge with the novelist's pen. It is clear that searches for foreign penetration, whether present or not, came close to paralyzing US intelligence.

=== Aldrich Ames ===
On February 24, 1994, the agency was rocked by the arrest of 31-year veteran case officer Aldrich Ames on charges of spying for the Soviet Union since 1985.

=== William Hamilton Martin and Bernon Mitchell ===
These two cryptologists working for the National Security Agency disappeared in September 1960 and then re-appeared as defectors at a news conference in Moscow. Francis Gary Powers speculated that they were responsible for the downing of the Lockheed U-2 he was piloting over the Soviet Union causing the 1960 U-2 incident. The analysis of the National Security Council, however, determined that the two were not recruited by the Soviets and that their defection was "impulsive."

== Denial and deception ==
Analysis of foreign denial and deception (D&D) activities is arguably among the most challenging of intelligence analytic disciplines. Throughout history, nations have sought advantage over rivals through the manipulation of valued information. Such manipulation spans a spectrum of activities from the simple act of keeping certain information exclusive or secret to sophisticated deceptions that seek to confuse or mislead an adversary's collection, analytic, and decisionmaking process. This spectrum includes denial, in which information is used in a "defensive" way by keeping it both secret and hidden (where the information gains further advantage through exclusivity and obscurity), and deception, in which information is used in an "offensive" way to mislead or confuse an adversary and which can include the use of both truthful and overt as well as false information in such a way as to influence a rival nation's perceptions. The discovery and uncovering of the first, and protection against the second, are "the two great purposes of intelligence

One of the greatest bargains in espionage history was the Soviet purchase of the technical manual for the KH–11 reconnaissance satellite from former CIA employee (now convicted spy) William Kampiles for a paltry $3,000. As a result of this theft and other compromises, U.S. intelligence must assume as a matter of course that overhead imagery and other technical collection will be met by D&D efforts.

== See also ==
- Counterintelligence
- Counterterrorism for a more detailed discussion of tactical response
- Intelligence cycle management
- Intelligence collection management
- HUMINT
- Intelligence analysis management
- Intelligence analysis
