= United States Army Publishing Directorate =

United States Army Publishing Directorate (APD)
Agency overview
- Jurisdiction: United States Army
- Headquarters: Fort Belvoir, Virginia, U.S.
- Parent agency: Office of the Administrative Assistant to the Secretary of the Army
- Website: armypubs.army.mil/default.aspx

The Army Publishing Directorate (APD) is the United States Army's centralized publications and forms management organization.

== Office symbol ==
In accordance with Army Regulation (AR) 25–59, ADP's office symbol is SAAA-APD.

== Mission ==
The Army Publishing Directorate (APD) supports readiness as the Army's centralized publications and forms management organization. APD authenticates, publishes, indexes, and manages Department of the Army publications and forms to ensure that Army policy is current and can be developed or revised quickly. APD also provides content management services, as well as illustrative and design services from in-house visual information specialists who design publication figure illustrations and manage custom 4 color print projects in support of both HQDA and Army-affiliated clientele.

== See also ==
=== Administrative Documents ===
The list below is not all-inclusive.

- US Army Regulations (AR)
  - AR 25-50 Preparing and Managing Correspondence (5/17/2013)
  - AR 670-1 Wear and Appearance of Army Uniforms and Insignia (5/25/2017)
- US Army General Orders (AGO)

=== Doctrine and Training ===
the list below is not all-inclusive

- US Army Doctrine Publications (ADP)
- US Army Doctrine Reference Publications (ADRP)
