= SAEDA =

US Army regulation

Subversion and Espionage Directed Against the US Army is a program directed by Army Regulation 381-12 (U). The regulation, published January 15, 1993, has three chapters and two appendices. The SAEDA program was created in order to combat Adversarial Intelligence (ADVINT), Industrial Espionage, and Terrorism during both peace and war.

== Purpose ==
This regulation establishes policy, responsibilities, and procedures for the recognition and prompt reporting of incidents of attempted or actual espionage, subversion, sabotage, and terrorism directed against the U.S. Army and its personnel; of illegal diversion of technology; unauthorized intrusion into automated information systems; unauthorized disclosure of classified information; and other incidents of a counterintelligence (CI) nature. This regulation establishes the requirement for CI awareness and education. The Army’s program for CI awareness, education, and reporting is known collectively as Subversion and Espionage Directed against the U.S. Army (SAEDA). The goal of the SAEDA program is to secure the assistance of every Department of the Army (DA) member in the deterrence and detection of intelligence and terrorist threats to the Army.

SAEDA applies to all DA personnel (military, civilian, and contractors) and all members of the US National Guard and Reserves.

== Indicators of espionage ==
- Any attempt to expand access to classified information by repeatedly volunteering for assignments or duties beyond the normal scope of responsibilities or attempting to obtain information for which the person has no authorized access or need-to-know.
- Unauthorized removal of classified materials from work area or unauthorized possession of classified material outside of work areas, such as in residences or vehicles.
- Extensive use of copy, facsimile, or computer equipment to reproduce or transmit classified material which may exceed job requirements.
- Repeated or unrequired work outside of normal duty hours, especially unaccompanied.
- Obtaining witness signatures on classified document destruction forms when the witness did not observe the destruction.
- Bringing unauthorized cameras, recording devices, computers, or modems into areas where classified data is stored, discussed, or processed.
- Unexplained or undue affluence, including sudden purchases of high value items (real estate, stocks, vehicles, or vacations, for example) where no logical income source exists. Attempts to explain wealth by reference to inheritance, luck in gambling, or some successful business venture.
- Opening several bank accounts containing substantial sums of money where no logical income source exists.
- Free spending or lavish display of wealth which appears beyond normal income.
- Sudden reversal of financial situation or sudden repayment of large debts or loans.
- Correspondence with persons in countries listed below.
- Unreported contact with officials of countries listed below.
- Frequent or unexplained trips of short duration to foreign countries.
- Attempts to offer extra income from an outside endeavor to personnel with sensitive jobs or to entice them into criminal situations which could lead to blackmail.
- Homesteading or repeatedly requesting extensions to tours of duty in one assignment or location, especially when the assignment offers significant access to sensitive information or the job is not desirable.
- Repeated involvement in security violations.
- Joking or bragging about working for a foreign intelligence service.
- Visits to a foreign embassy, consulate, trade, or press office.
- Business dealings with nationals or firms of countries listed below.

== Punishment ==
All service members are subject to punishment under the Uniform Code of Military Justice as well as to adverse administrative or other adverse action authorized by applicable provisions of the United States Code or federal regulations.

All non-service members are punishable under Title 18 of the US Code.

Penalties vary from time in jail to death sentences.

== Countries of concern ==
- Afghanistan
- Albania
- Bulgaria
- People’s Republic of China
- Colombia
- Cuba (except U.S. Naval Base)
- Estonia
- Iran
- Iraq
- Laos
- Latvia
- Lebanon
- Libya
- Lithuania
- Myanmar (formerly Burma)
- Nicaragua
- North Korea
- Peru
- Romania
- South Africa
- Syria
- Vietnam
- States of the former USSR or Russia
- Territory of the former Yugoslavia

== See also ==
- US Army Regulation 25-50
