= Operational security =

Counterespionage safety procedures and practices

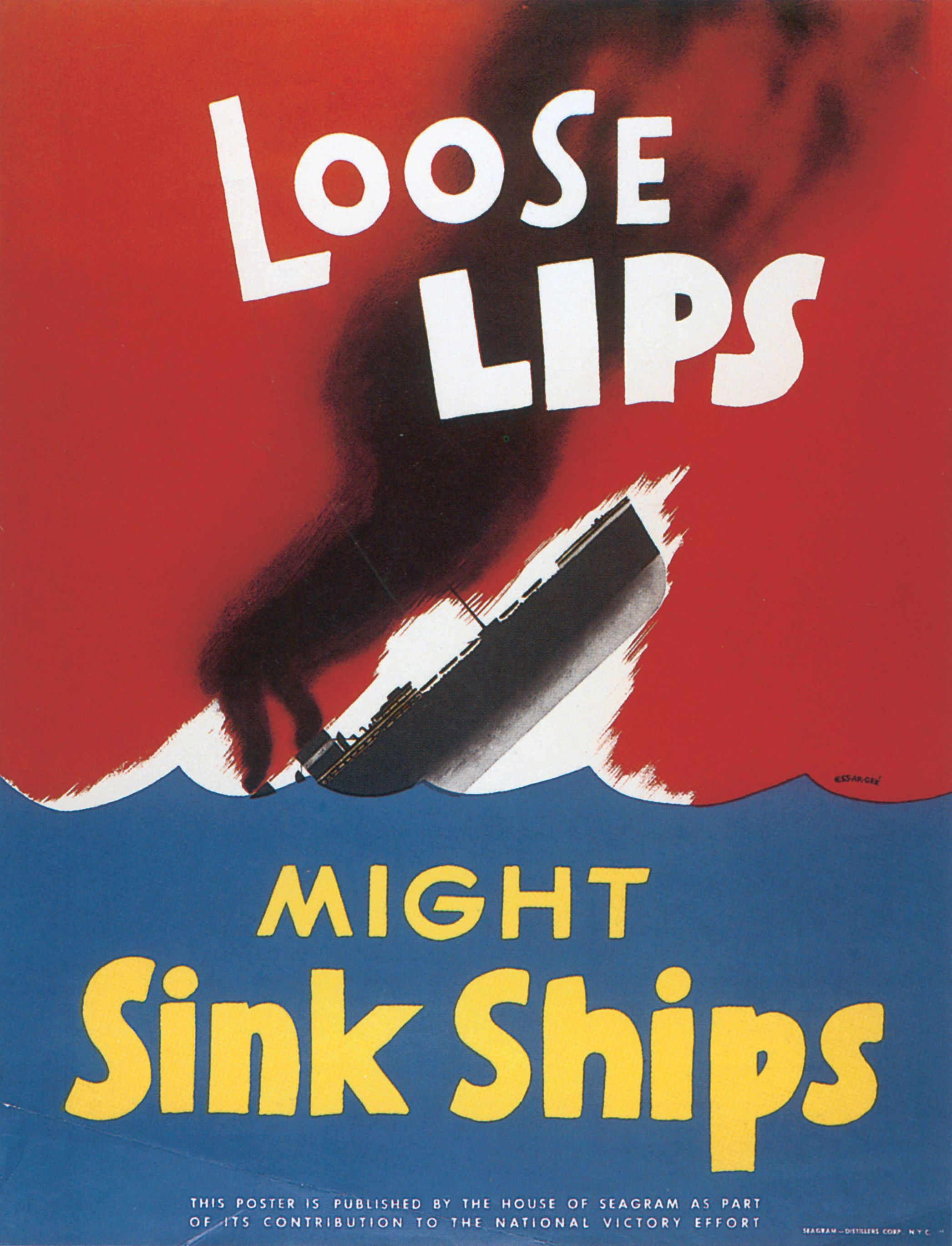
World War II propaganda poster which popularized the cautionary phrase "Loose lips sink ships"

Operational security (OPSEC) or operations security is a process that identifies critical information to determine whether friendly actions can be observed by enemy intelligence, determines if information obtained by adversaries could be interpreted to be useful to them, and then executes selected measures that eliminate or reduce adversary exploitation of friendly critical information.

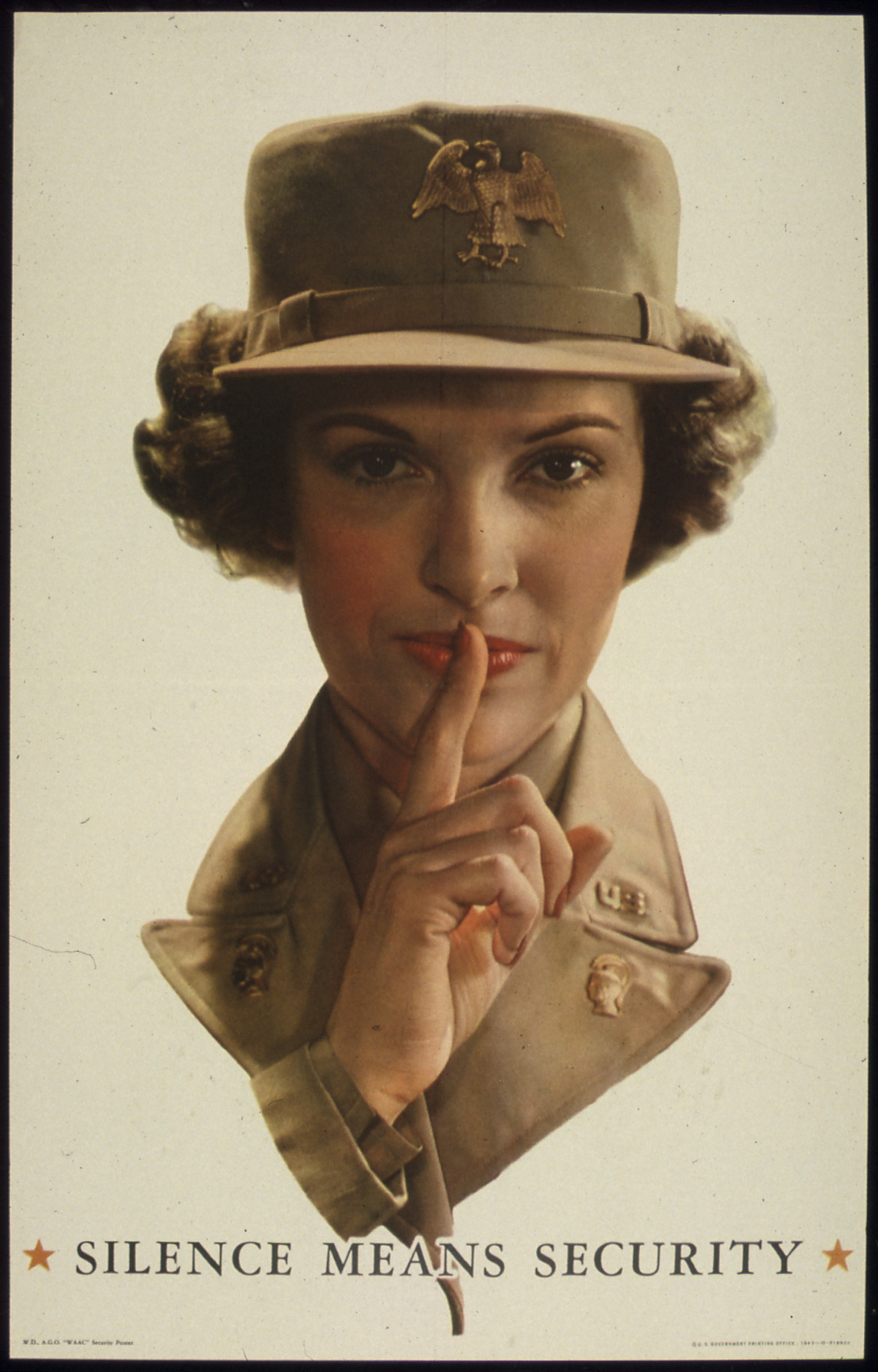
Women's Army Corps anti-rumor propaganda (1941–1945)

The term "operations security" was coined by the United States Armed Forces during the Vietnam War.

== History ==
=== Vietnam ===
In 1966, United States Admiral Ulysses Sharp established a multidisciplinary security team to investigate the failure of certain combat operations during the Vietnam War. This operation was dubbed Operation Purple Dragon, and included personnel from the National Security Agency and the Department of Defense.

When the operation concluded, the Purple Dragon team codified their recommendations. They called the process "Operations Security" in order to distinguish the process from existing processes and ensure continued inter-agency support.

=== NSDD 298 ===
In 1988, President Ronald Reagan signed National Security Decision Directive (NSDD) 298. This document established the National Operations Security Program and named the Director of the National Security Agency as the executive agent for inter-agency OPSEC support. This document also established the Interagency OPSEC Support Staff (IOSS).

== Private-sector application ==
OPSEC can be used as a defensive measure against competitive intelligence collection efforts. In the IT field, NIST SP 800-53 defines OPSEC as the "process by which potential adversaries can be denied information about capabilities and intentions by identifying, controlling, and protecting generally unclassified evidence of the planning and execution of sensitive activities."

== See also ==
- Information security
- Intelligence cycle security
- Security culture
- Social engineering
