= Operation RAFTER =

MI5 radio receiver detection technique

RAFTER was a code name for the MI5 radio receiver detection technique, mostly used against clandestine Soviet agents and monitoring of domestic radio transmissions by foreign embassy personnel from the 1950s on.

== Explanation ==
Most radio receivers of the period were of the AM superhet design, with local oscillators which generate a signal typically 455 kHz above or sometimes below the frequency to be received. There is always some oscillator radiation leakage from such receivers, and in the initial stages of RAFTER, MI5 simply attempted to locate clandestine receivers by detecting the leaked signal with a sensitive custom-built receiver. This was complicated by domestic radios in people's homes also leaking radiation.

By accident in March 1958, when Peter Wright and his assistant Tony Sale were testing whether they could detect any receivers inside the Soviet Embassy in London, the system unexpectedly proved its worth. As they were monitoring, a strong transmission from a passing MI5 watcher car overloaded their equipment, causing an audible change in the received signal, and revealing that the embassy was monitoring MI5’s radio frequencies. They realized that they could identify the actual frequency being monitored if they produced their own transmissions and listened for the change in the superhet tone.

== Soviet transmitters ==
Soviet short-wave transmitters were extensively used to broadcast messages to clandestine agents, the transmissions consisting simply of number sequences read aloud and decoded using a one-time pad. It was realized that this new technique could be used to track down such agents. Specially equipped aircraft would fly over urban areas at times when the agents were receiving Soviet transmissions, and attempt to locate receivers tuned to the transmissions.

== Tactics ==
In his book Spycatcher, former MI5 officer Peter Wright related an incident in which a mobile RAFTER unit was driven around the backstreets in an attempt to locate a receiver, but the search proved futile. Initially, MI5 believed interference and the effects of large metal objects such as lamp posts in the surrounding frustrated the search. Later, however, they concluded that the receiver itself had been mobile, and the receiver may at one point have been parked next to the RAFTER unit but hidden by a high fence.
