= William Kampiles =

CIA Agent (born 1954)

- Born: December 21, 1954 (age 71)
- Other names: Vasili, Billy
- Occupation: CIA Clerk
- Known for: Cold War - Stole a top-secret American KH-11 spy satellite manual and sold it to the Soviets.

William Peter Kampiles (born December 21, 1954) is a former United States Central Intelligence Agency (CIA) employee during the Cold War known for selling a top secret KH-11 spy satellite manual in 1977.

== Early life ==
Born to Greek parents, Kampiles grew up in Hegewisch, on the far south side of Chicago. Kampiles' family was poor and lived in a small rental apartment. His father died in 1964, when Kampiles was nine. He attended college with a state grant from his father's social security benefit, by working at the college cafeteria, and his mother's salary from working at the south side Ford factory in the cafeteria.

== Career ==
While attending Indiana University, he was recruited by the CIA in 1977. He found his job, routing message traffic, to be boring, and quit after a year when a transfer failed. His friend George Joannides later testified that Kampiles had wanted to work in the covert section of the CIA, but would need to undertake the necessary training. Upon quitting, he stole a top-secret KH-11 spy satellite manual from CIA headquarters in 1977 for monetary gain, with the intention of becoming a double agent.

=== Espionage and prison ===
In January 1978, Kampiles surprised his friends by flying unexpectedly to Athens, Greece, in the middle of winter which was highly uncommon, instead of summer as most Greek-Americans did. He walked into the Soviet Embassy there, asking to speak to an agent to sell the top secret KH-11 manual. He was given $3,000 by a Soviet KGB agent named Michael, given a camera, and instructions to gather and bring back more secrets. Afterwards, Kampiles contacted a Greek-American CIA agent about his contact with a Soviet agent and told him what he had done, in the hope of being rewarded with a position as a CIA spy. The case was passed off to another Greek-American, experienced senior research analyst Vivian Psachos, who realized the story Kampiles gave was not true. FBI agents arrested Kampiles at home in Munster, Indiana on August 18.

On November 17, 1978, a jury found Kampiles guilty of six counts of espionage, 40 years each, totalling 240 years. On December 22, one day after his 24th birthday, Kampiles was sentenced to a total of 40 years imprisonment, and later sent to a federal prison in Wisconsin. It was there that he met Jimmy Baker who was serving his federal sentence, and another inmate, a judge from New York who befriended him and referred his case to a Loyola University Law professor who helped reduce his prison sentence to 18 years. Kampiles was released on December 16, 1996, after serving 18 years.

== See also ==
- Samuel Loring Morison - An intelligence analyst who provided KH-11 photographs to the Jane's Fighting Ships publication and was convicted of espionage.
- James Hall III – An Army warrant officer and intelligence analyst in Germany who sold eavesdropping and code secrets to East Germany and the Soviet Union from 1983 to 1988.
- George Trofimoff – a then retired Army Reserve colonel, who was charged in June 2000 with spying for the KGB and the Russian Foreign Intelligence Service (or SVR) for over 25 years.
- John Anthony Walker – An American communications specialist who was convicted of spying
- Aldrich Ames - an ex-CIA agent convicted of spying for Russia
- Noshir Gowadia - an ex-employee of Northrop who sold classified B-2 stealth technology to China
- List of American spies
