= Spycatcher =

Memoir by Peter Wright

- Author: Peter Wright (with Paul Greengrass)
- Language: English
- Subject: Espionage
- Publisher: Heinemann (Australia)
- Publication date: 31 July 1987
- Pages: 392
- ISBN: 0-670-82055-5
- OCLC: 17234291
- Dewey Decimal: 327.1/2/0924 B 19

Spycatcher: The Candid Autobiography of a Senior Intelligence Officer (1987) is a memoir written by Peter Wright, former MI5 officer and assistant director, and co-author Paul Greengrass. Wright drew on his experiences and research into the history of the British intelligence community. Published first in Australia, the book was banned in England (but not Scotland) due to its allegations about government policy and incidents. These efforts ensured the book's notoriety, and it earned considerable profit for Wright.

In 2021 and 2023, the Cabinet Office was still blocking or redacting freedom of information requests for files on the Spycatcher affair. Information belonging to the security services is absolutely exempted from the Freedom of Information Act.

== Content ==
In Spycatcher, Wright says that one of his assignments was to unmask a Soviet mole in MI5, who he says was Roger Hollis, a former MI5 Director General. His book also discusses other candidates who may or may not have been the mole. He explores the history of MI5 by chronicling its principal officers, from the 1930s to his time in service. He makes serious allegations against MI6 intelligence officer Dick Ellis, who died in 1975.

Wright also tells of the MI6 plot to assassinate President Nasser during the Suez Crisis; of joint MI5-CIA plotting against Labour Prime Minister Harold Wilson (who had been secretly accused by Soviet defector Anatoliy Golitsyn of being a KGB agent); and of MI5's eavesdropping on high-level Commonwealth conferences.

Wright examines the techniques of intelligence services, exposes their ethics, notably their "eleventh commandment", "Thou shalt not get caught." He described many MI5 electronic technologies (some of which he developed), for instance, allowing clever spying into rooms, and identifying the frequency to which a superhet receiver is tuned. In the afterword, he said that he wrote the book chiefly to work to regain compensation for losses of significant pension income when the British government ruled his pension for earlier work in GCHQ was not transferable.

== Publication and trial ==
Wright wrote Spycatcher in Tasmania, after his retirement from MI5. He first attempted publication of his memoirs in 1985. The British government immediately obtained a court order banning publication in the UK, but the order applied only in the United Kingdom (and even then did not apply in Scotland with its separate legal system), and the book continued to be available elsewhere. In September 1987, the UK government applied for similar orders to prevent publication in Australia, but the publisher's lawyer Malcolm Turnbull, who later served as Prime Minister of Australia, successfully resisted the application, as he did on appeal in June 1988.

English newspapers attempting proper reporting about Spycatcher's principal allegations were served gag orders; on persisting, they were tried for contempt of court. These charges were eventually dropped. Throughout all this, the book continued to be sold in Scotland; moreover, Scottish newspapers were not subject to any English gag order, and continued to report on the affair. Quantities of the book easily reached English purchasers from Scotland, while other copies were smuggled into England from Australia and elsewhere. A notable television report at the time featured a reporter flying to Australia, and returning to England with ten copies of the book, which he declared to Heathrow airport's customs officers. After some discussion, he was allowed to take the books into England, as the customs service had not been told to confiscate them.

In mid-1987, Mr Justice Scott lifted the ban on English newspaper reportage on the book. In late July, the Law Lords again barred reporting Wright's allegations. The Daily Mirror published upside-down photographs of the three Law Lords, with the caption 'You Fools'. British editions of The Economist ran a blank page with a boxed explanation that

In all but one country, our readers have on this page a review of 'Spycatcher,' a book by an ex-M.I.5-man, Peter Wright. The exception is Britain, where the book, and comment on it, have been banned. For our 420,000 readers there, this page is blank – and the law is an ass.

Eventually, in 1988, the book was cleared for legitimate sale when the Law Lords acknowledged that overseas publication meant it contained no secrets. However, Wright was barred from receiving royalties from the sale of the book in the United Kingdom. In November 1991, the European Court of Human Rights ruled that the British government had breached the European Convention on Human Rights in gagging its newspapers. The accuracy of various allegations made in the book by Wright was questioned in a 1993 review of Spycatcher published by the Center for the Study of Intelligence, an in-house think tank for the CIA. While admitting (on page 42) that the book included "factual data", the document stated that it was also "filled with [unspecified] errors, exaggerations, bogus ideas, and self-inflation".

The book has sold more than two million copies. In 1995, Wright died a millionaire from proceeds of his book.

== See also ==
- Cambridge Five – British ring of spies for the Soviet Union
- Julia Pirie – British Cold War spy
- Streisand effect – Increased awareness of information after suppression efforts
- Economical with the truth – Euphemism for dishonesty

== Literature ==
- Burnet, David; Thomas, Richard (Summer 1989). "Spycatcher: The Commodification of Truth". Journal of Law and Society. 16 (2): 210–224. doi:10.2307/1410360. JSTOR 1410360.
- To Catch A Spy: How the Spycatcher Affair Brought MI5 in from the Cold, Tim Tate, Icon Books, 2024. ISBN 978-1-83773-119-0
