= Radar MASINT =

Subdiscipline of measurement and signature intelligence

Intelligence cycle management
Intelligence collection management
MASINT
- Electro-optical MASINT
- Nuclear MASINT
- Geophysical MASINT
- Radar MASINT
- Materials MASINT
- Radiofrequency MASINT

Radar MASINT is a subdiscipline of measurement and signature intelligence (MASINT) and refers to intelligence gathering activities that bring together disparate elements that do not fit within the definitions of signals intelligence (SIGINT), imagery intelligence (IMINT), or human intelligence (HUMINT).

According to the United States Department of Defense, MASINT is technically derived intelligence (excluding traditional imagery IMINT and signals intelligence) that – when collected, processed, and analyzed by dedicated MASINT systems – results in intelligence that detects, tracks, identifies, or describes the distinctive characteristics target sources. in the US MASINT was recognized as a formal intelligence discipline in 1986.

As with many branches of MASINT, specific techniques may overlap with the six major conceptual disciplines of MASINT defined by the Center for MASINT Studies and Research, which divides MASINT into electro-optical, nuclear, geophysical, radar, materials, and radiofrequency disciplines.

Radar MASINT is complementary to SIGINT. While the ELINT subdiscipline of SIGINT analyzes the structure of radar directed on a target, radar MASINT is concerned with using specialized radar techniques that measure characteristics of targets.

Another MASINT subdiscipline, radiofrequency MASINT, considers the unintentional radiation emitted from a radar transmitter (e.g., sidelobes)

MASINT radar sensors may be on space, sea, air, and fixed or mobile platforms. Specialized MASINT radar techniques include line-of-sight (LOS), over-the-horizon, synthetic aperture radar (SAR), inverse synthetic aperture radar (ISAR) and multistatic. It involves the active or passive collection of energy reflected from a target or object by LOS, bistatic, or over-the-horizon radar systems. RADINT collection provides information on radar cross-sections, tracking, precise spatial measurements of components, motion and radar reflectance, and absorption characteristics for dynamic targets and objectives.

Radar MASINT can be active, with the MASINT platform both transmitting and receiving. In multistatic applications, there is physical separation among two or more receivers and transmitters. MASINT can also passively receive signals reflected from an enemy beam.

As with many intelligence disciplines, it can be a challenge to integrate the technologies into the active services, so they can be used by warfighters. Still, radar has characteristics especially appropriate for MASINT. While there are radars (ISAR) that can produce images, radar pictures are generally not as sharp as those taken by optical sensors, but radar is largely independent of day or night, cloud or sun. Radar can penetrate many materials, such as wooden buildings. Improving the resolution of an imaging radar requires that the antenna size is many times that of the radar wavelength. Wavelength is inversely proportional to frequency, so increasing the radar frequency can improve resolution. It can be difficult to generate high power at the higher frequencies, or problems such as attenuation by water in the atmosphere limit performance. In general, for a fixed sensor, electro-optical sensors, in UV, visual, or infrared spectra, will outperform imaging radar.

SAR and ISAR are means of combining multiple radar samples, taken over time, to create the effect of a much larger antenna, far larger than would physically be possible, for a given radar frequency. As SAR and ISAR develop better resolution, there can be an argument if they still are MASINT sensors, or if they create images sufficiently sharp that they properly are IMINT sensors. Radar can also merge with other sensors to give even more information, such as moving target indicator. Radar generally must acquire its images from an angle, which often means that it can look into the sides of buildings, producing a movie-like record over time, and being able to form three-dimensional views over time.

== Line-of-sight radar MASINT ==
=== Counterartillery radar ===
See Counter-battery radar

Three US radar systems exist for detecting hostile artillery fire and backtracking to its source, serving the dual requirements of warning of incoming fires and counterattacking the firer. While they are intended to be used in three tiers against artillery of different ranges, there can be a problem of having a threat of an unexpected type fired into an area covered by the wrong tier. Proper site selection and preparation is necessary for all types.

Proper planning includes avoiding clutter sources such as land surfaces, vegetation, buildings, complex terrain, aircraft (particularly rotary wing) and particulate matter kicked up by wind or aircraft. The enemy may attempt to avoid the directional radar systems or even use electronic countermeasures, so active patrolling, and activating the radar at random times and in random directions will act as a counter-countermeasure. Complementary acoustic and electro-optical systems can compensate for the lack of omnidirectional coverage by the AN/TPQ-36 and AN/TPQ-37.

To complement the counterartillery radars, additional MASINT sensors include acoustic and electro-optical systems.

A variety of ground-to-ground radars serve in counterbattery and surveillance roles, and also have some capability to detect helicopters. The LCMR, AN/TPQ-36, and AN/TPQ-37 radars are ideally used in a layered detection system, for short, medium, and long range detection. LCMR is omnidirectional, but the other two are directional and need cueing from omnidirectional sensors such as the combined electro-optical and acoustic Rocket Launch Spotter or a pure acoustic system such as HALO or UTAMS

==== AN/TPQ-36 and −37 counterartillery radars ====
These 1980-vintage systems are not man-portable, and are directional, but they do have longer range than the LCMR.

Physically heavier than the LCMR, the AN/TPQ-36 Firefinder radar can detect cannon, rockets, and mortars within its range:

- Artillery: 14,500 meters
- Mortars: 18,000 meters
- Rockets: 24,000 meters

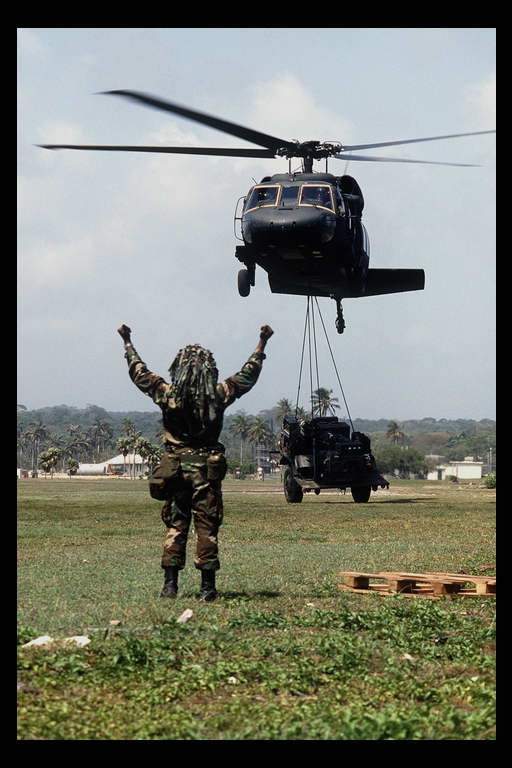
AN/TPQ-36 medium-range Firefinder being positioned

It has a moving rather than omnidirectional antenna. Current improvements are intended to replace its old control computer with a laptop, enhance performance in high clutter environments, and increase the probability of detecting certain rockets.

First intended to provide a third tier against long-range threats, the AN/TPQ-37 Firefinder radar basic software filters out all other radar tracks with signatures of lesser-ranged threats. New software, required by the mortar threat in the Balkans, allows it to duplicate the Q-36 mortar detection range of 18 kilometers, while still detecting longer-range threats. Proper crew training should compensate for the reduced clutter rejection caused by accepting mortar signatures.

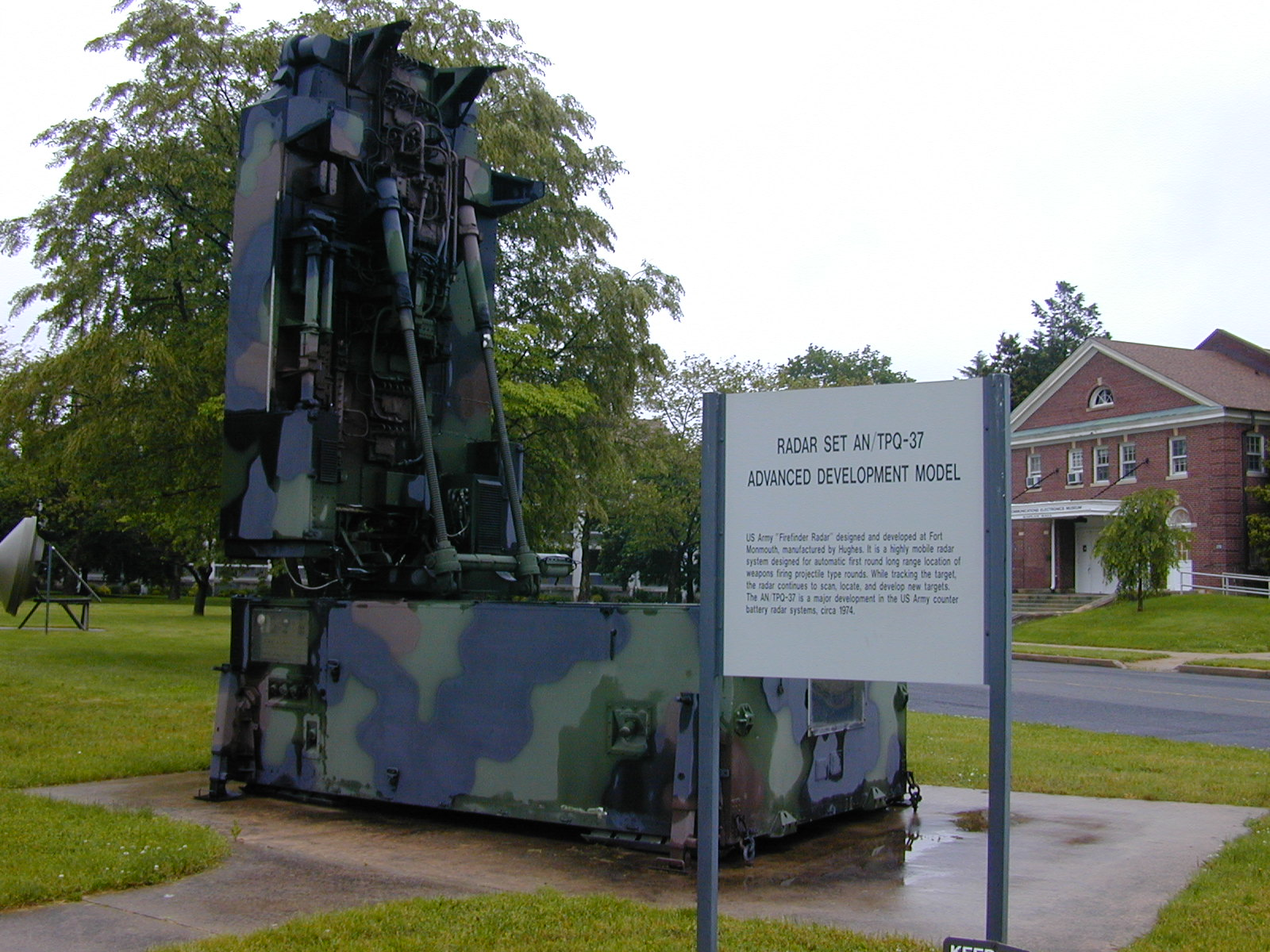
Long-range AN/TPQ-37

Standard TPQ-36/37 radars are semi-manual in their plotting. An Israeli enhancement makes the plotting fully digital .

=== Ground surveillance radar ===
Portable, and intended for tactical use, is the man-portable surveillance and target acquisition radar (MSTAR), originally developed for British use in artillery spotting, as the primary users of MSTAR, like its predecessor, were and are artillery observation parties, although it may be used for ground reconnaissance and surveillance. The MSTAR entered UK service in early 1991, slightly accelerated for use in the Gulf War. Its official UK designation is Radar, GS, No 22. MSTAR was developed and produced in UK in the mid-1980s by Thorn EMI Electronics (now part of Thales).

It is a Doppler radar operating in the J Band, and is capable of detecting, recognising and tracking helicopters, slow moving fixed-wing aircraft, tracked and wheeled vehicles and troops, as well as observing and adjusting the fall of shot. The US uses it used as AN/PPS-5B and −5C Ground Surveillance Radar (GSR) Sets, and Australia calls its version AMSTAR.

The GSR is a ground-to-ground surveillance radar set for use by units such as infantry and tank battalions. and BCT RSTA units. It can detect and locate moving personnel at ranges of 6 km and vehicles at ranges of 10 km, day or night under virtually all weather conditions. The radar has a maximum display range of 10,000 meters and the radar can alert the operator both aurally and visually. The APS/PPS-15 is a lighter, shorter ranged version intended for airborne, light infantry, and special operations force use. These radars are more MASINT then general purpose radar, as the simpler ones have very little imaging power, but perhaps a light or sound indicating the direction and range of the threat.

Recognizing the threat of ground surveillance radar, the Australian military is exploring personal radar warning receivers (RWR), approximately the size of a credit card, and intended principally for special operations forces who have to evade ground surveillance radar.

=== Fixed or semimobile ground installations ===
The COBRA DANE ground station radar is an "AN/FPS-108, a phased array L-Band antenna containing 15,360 radiating elements occupying 95% of the roughly 100 by 100-foot (30 m) area of one face of the building housing the system. The antenna is oriented toward the west, monitoring the northern Pacific missile test areas."

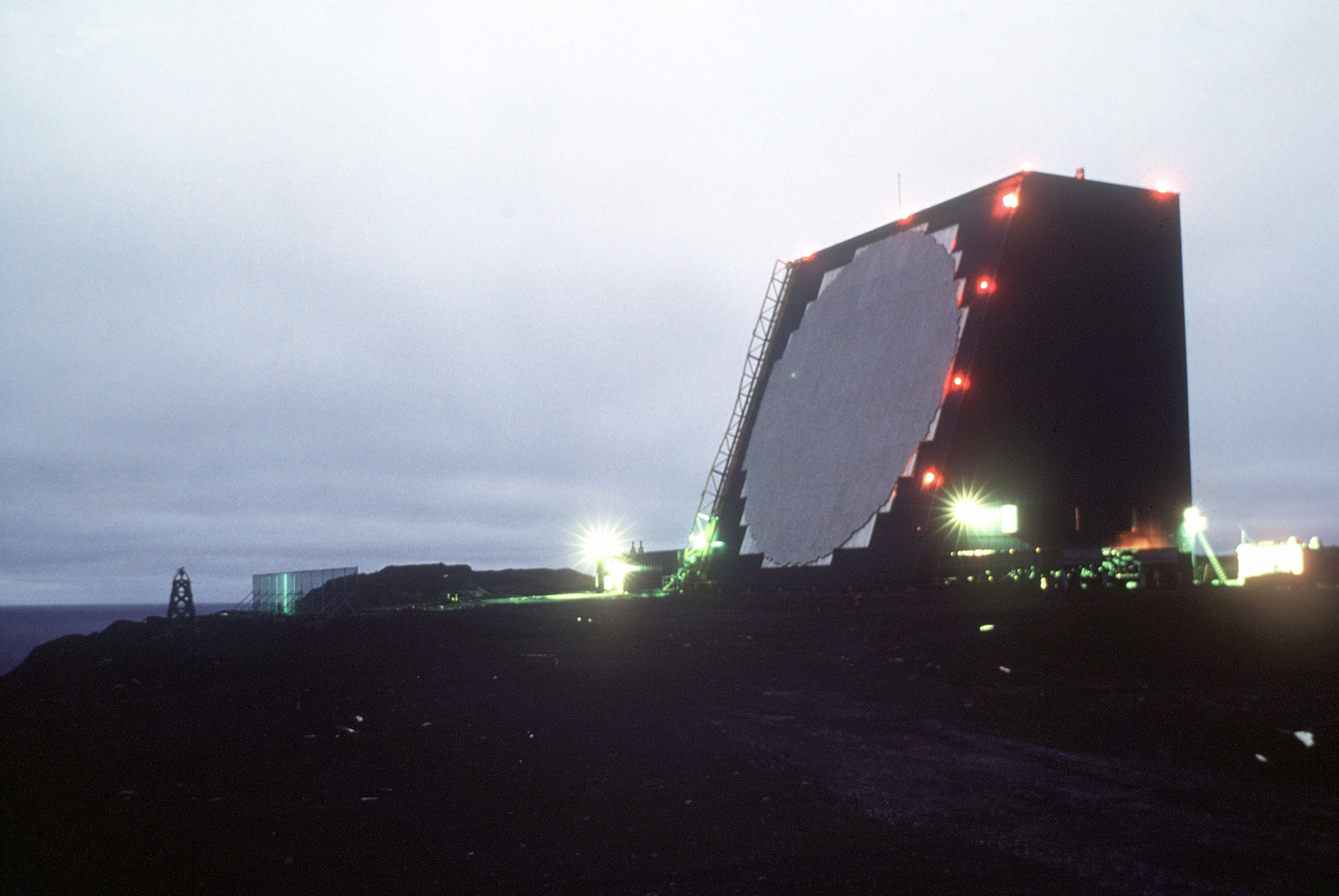
Night view of the AN/FPS-108 Cobra Dane RADAR

Methods continue to evolve. COBRA JUDY was intended to gather information on long-range missiles, in a strategic role. One developmental system, COBRA GEMINI, is intended to complement COBRA JUDY. It can be used for observing long-range missiles, but is also appropriate for theater-level weapons, which may be addressed in regional arms limitation agreements, such as the Missile Technology Control Regime (MCTR). Where COBRA JUDY is built into a ship, this dual frequency (S- and X-band) radar is transportable, capable of operating on ships or on land, and optimized for monitoring medium range ballistic missiles and antimissile systems. It is air-transportable to deal with sudden monitoring contingencies.

=== Ship-based ===
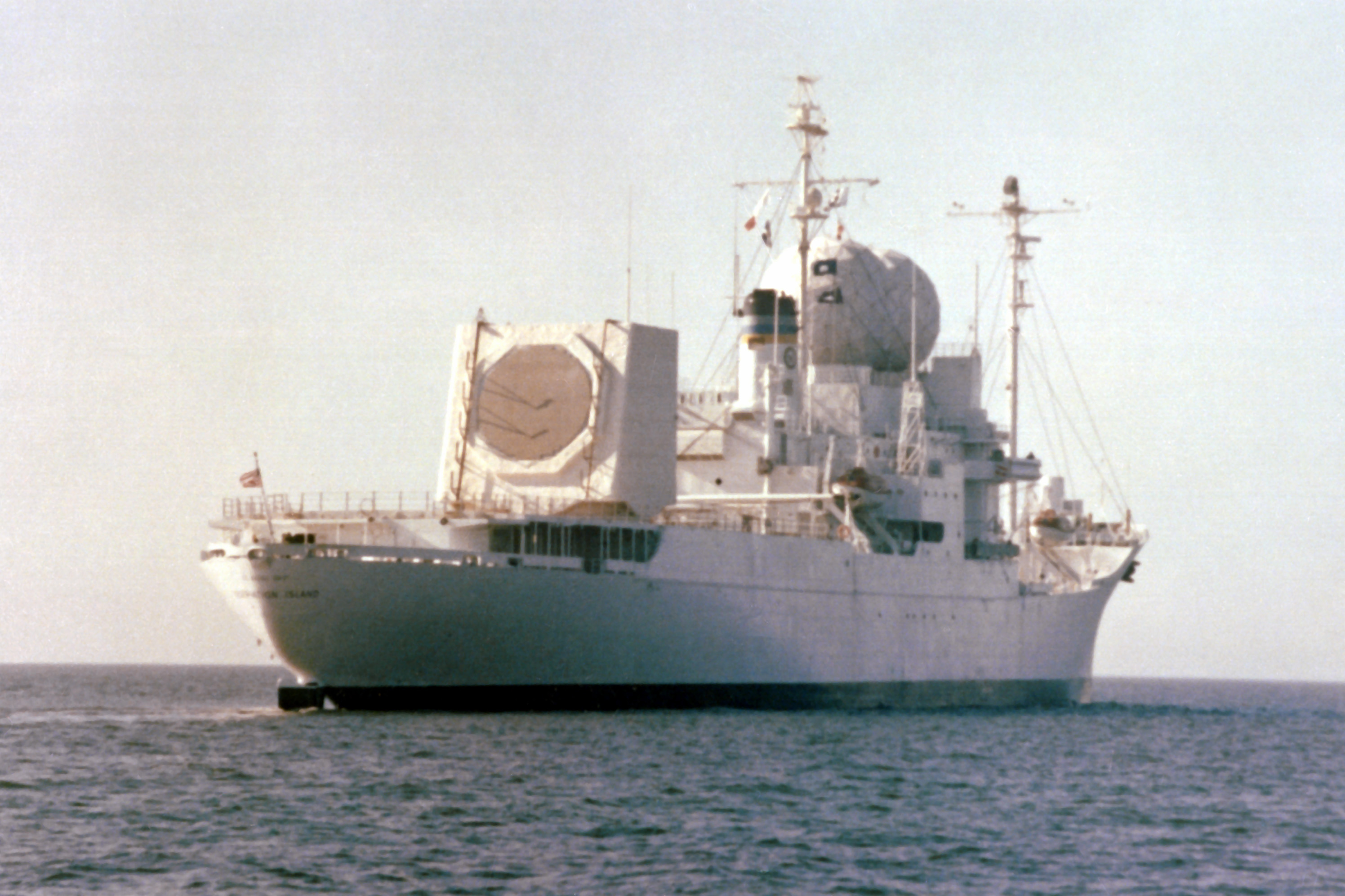
Aft view of the USNS Observation Island showing the location of the AN/SPQ-11 Cobra Judy array.

The AN/SPQ-11 Cobra Judy radar, on USNS Observation Island (T-AGM-23), could also be guided by the COBRA BALL electro-optical sensors on an RC-135. Cobra Judy was supplemented by Cobra Gemini on USNS Invincible (T-AGM-24) starting around 2000 and was replaced by Cobra King in 2014 on USNS Howard O. Lorenzen (T-AGM-25).

=== Active line-of-sight satellite radar ===
The Soviet Union used a number of radar-equipped ocean reconnaissance satellites (RORSAT), which used strong radar systems, powered by an onboard nuclear reactor, to visualize vessels. These operated in the "pushbroom" manner, scanning a swath straight down.

US radar satellites, however, have emphasized SAR and ISAR.

== Synthetic aperture radar (SAR) and inverse synthetic aperture radar (ISAR) MASINT ==
A synthetic aperture radar (SAR) system, exploits the fast movement of an aircraft or satellite, simulating a large antenna by combining samples over time. This simulation is called the synthetic aperture.

Coupled with other MASINT and IMINT sensors, SAR can provide a high-resolution day and night collection capability. Recorded over time, it can be excellent for tracking changes. When operated at appropriate frequencies, it has ground- and water-penetrating capability, and is good for picking objects out of deliberate or natural clutter.

SAR is not, however, a trivial computational task. As the real antenna moves past the target, the range between target and antenna changes, which must be considered in synthesizing the aperture. In discussing SAR principles, Sandia National Laboratories also notes that, "for fine resolution systems, the range and azimuth processing is coupled (dependent on each other) which also greatly increases the computational processing".

In spite of the difficulties, SAR has evolved to a size that can fit aboard a UAV. Flying on the MQ-1 Predator, the Northrop Grumman AN/ZPQ-1 Tactical Endurance Synthetic Aperture Radar (Tesar) started operations, in March 1996, over Bosnia. The AN/ZPQ-1 uses a radar signal in the 10 – 20 GHz J-band, and can work in strip map, spot map, and MTI modes. These modes are applicable to a wide range of MASINT sensors.

Strip map imaging observes terrain parallel to the flight path or along a specified ground path. Resolution depends on range and swath width, and can vary from 0.3 to 1.0 metres.

Compare the two. The radar is not affected by night or weather.

Spot map mode covers 800 x 800 metres or 2400 × 2400 metres. In MTI mode, moving targets are overlaid on a digital map.

As well as large SAR aircraft such as the E-8 Joint Surveillance Target Attack Radar System (Joint STARS), whose AN/APY-3 radar has multiple modes including ground moving target indication, the US has highly classified radar satellites. Quill launched in 1964, was the first radar satellite, essentially a prototype. A system originally called Lacrosse (or Lacros), Indigo, and finally Onyx appears to be the only US radar satellite system, using pushbroom scans and "spotlighting" SAR.

Given that the E-8 is a large aircraft that cannot defend itself, there are US attempts to move the E-8 capability into space, under a variety of names, most recently a simple "Space Radar". In an era of budget demands, however, this extremely costly new generation has not been launched.

ISAR can produce actual images, but the discipline is generally called MASINT rather than IMINT. A much more modest ISAR capability is on the Navy's SH-60 multimission helicopter, carried on destroyers, cruisers, and aircraft carriers. If budgets permit, the proposed E-8 aircraft, the replacement for the P-3 maritime surveillance aircraft, will carry ISAR.

P-3 aircraft carry the AN/APS-137B(V)5 radar, which has SAR and ISAR capability. This is part of the general upgrading of the P-3 to make it a capable land surveillance platform.

The German Armed Forces' (Bundeswehr) military SAR-Lupe reconnaissance satellite system has been fully operational since 22 July 2008.

=== SAR interferometry ===
This technique, first demonstrated in the 1970s from an army airborne system, has evolved considerably. At first, it estimated the angle-of-arrival of backscatter power from a pixel on the ground by comparing the phase difference of the backscattered wave as measured at two different locations. This information along with the traditional range and azimuth (Doppler) information allowed one to locate the imaged pixel in three-dimensions, and hence estimate the elevation of that pixel. Elevation-mapping interferometric SAR systems have since become an important remote sensing technology, with a very specific height-mapping mission. Interferometric SAR systems can now be obtained as commercial off-the-shelf (COTS) products.

Detection of mines, both on the active battlefield and in reconstituting nations with unexploded ordnance (UXO) remains a critical problem. As part of the Strategic Environmental Research and Development Program (SERDP), the U.S. Army Research Laboratory (ARL), starting in 1997, began an effort to collect, under extremely controlled condition, a library of UXO signatures.

==== UWB Synthetic Aperture Radar (SAR) ====
As part of a larger research initiative to create technology that could detect targets buried or hidden by foliage, the U.S. Army Research Laboratory (ARL) developed multiple UWB SAR radar systems with promising object-penetration capabilities. These radar systems were fully polarimetric and were generally designed to be mounted on an all-terrain vehicle for mobile applications on the battlefield. Examples of ARL-designed UWB SAR systems include the railSAR, the boomSAR, the SIRE radar, and the SAFIRE radar.

The railSAR was among the earliest of the UWB SAR technology at ARL and was constructed as a stationary, rail-guided impulse radar system. It was then incorporated into the development of the boomSAR in 1995, which emulated the functions of an airborne radar system. Afterwards, the UWB SAR technology was eventually transferred onto a vehicle-based platform like with the SIRE radar and the SAFIRE radar for greater access and mobility.

==== Steel crater test area ====
Once the basic terrain signature is known, signatures are being collected from terrain that has been disturbed in a controlled manner. One such environment is at the Yuma Proving Grounds, a desert area where an existing Unexploded Ordnance (UXO) test site, the Steel Crater Test Area, has been used for a variety of sensor calibrations. It contains buried land mines, wires, pipes, vehicles, 55-gallon drums, storage containers and arms caches. For the Army studies to define the signatures of UXO detection, over 600 additional pieces of inert UXO were added to the Steel Crater Test Area, including bombs (250, 500, 750, 1000, and 2000 lb), mortars (60 and 81 mm), artillery shells (105 and 155 mm), 2.75-in. rockets, cluster submunitions (M42, BLU-63, M68, BLU-97, and M118), and mines (Gator, VS1.6, M12, PMN, and POM-Z).

=== Coherent change detection (CCD) ===
In the 1990s, a new SAR application of coherent SAR showed the ability the detection and measurement of very small changes in the earth's surface. The simplest form of this technology, known as coherent change detection (CCD), had obvious military and intelligence applications, and is now a valuable tool for analysts. CCD complements other sensors: knowing that the surface changed may mean that analysts can direct ground-penetrating radar on it, measure thermal signatures to see if something is generating heat under the ground, etc.

Compare radar CCD and optical equivalents of the same subject. The CCD would not have been affected by night or weather.

=== Moving target indicator ===
Moving target indications (MTI), at first, might seem just an adjunct to imaging radar, allowing the operator to focus on the moving target. That which makes them peculiarly MASINT, however is, especially in combination with other sensors and reference material, allows the measurement of a movement signature. For example, a tank and a truck both might be measured at 40 km/h when on a road. If both turn onto unpaved ground, however, the signature of the truck is that it might slow significantly, or demonstrate much lateral instability. The tracked vehicle, however, might exhibit a signature of not slowing when going off-pavement.

There are several electronic approaches to MTI. One is a refinement of CCD. Differential interferometric SAR is even more precise than CCD. Its use in measuring the ground motion of earthquakes can complement seismic sensors for detecting concealed underground explosions, or the characteristics of those above ground.

Current research and development involves multiple coherent SAR collections to make even more sensitive measurements, with the capability to detect motion as small as 1 mm per year. The new techniques address many of the limiting factors associated with SAR interferometry, such as atmospheric induced distortions.

=== UHF/VHF SAR ===
UHF and VHF SAR have begun limited operations on Army RC-12 aircraft and may be implemented on the Global Hawk. DARPA's WATCH-IT program developed robust low false alarm density change detection software to detect vehicles and smaller targets under foliage, under camouflage and in urban clutter, and developed tomographic (3D) imaging to detect and identify targets that have not relocated. VHF/UHF SAR for building penetration, urban mapping and performing change detection of objects inside buildings.

Terrain characterization technologies were also developed, including the abilities to rapidly generate bald-earth terrain height estimates and to classify terrain features from multipass VHF/UHF SAR imagery. In September 2004, DARPA demonstrated real-time onboard change detection (vehicles and IEDs) and rapid ground-station tomographic processing, as well as rapid generation of bald earth digital elevation models (DEMs) using stereo processing. In parallel, the Air Force Targets Under Trees (TUT) program enhanced the VHF SAR by adding a 10 km swath width VHF-only mode, developing a real-time VHF change detection capability/

== Non-cooperative target recognition ==
Driving research into Non-Cooperative Target Recognition (NCTR) is the fratricide problem, which, according to Army Maj. Bill McKean, is that "... our weapons can kill at a greater range than we can identify a target as friend or foe. Yet if you wait until you're close enough to be sure you are firing at an enemy, you've lost your advantage." The procedural approach of more restrictive rules of engagement (ROE), according to McKean, "What they found was, if you tighten the rules of engagement to the point that you reduce fratricide, the enemy begins inflicting greater casualties on you. "Waiting until you're sure in combat could mean becoming a casualty yourself.". Technical approaches to fratricide prevention include:

1. Systems that align with the weapon or weapon sight and are pointed at the intended target, and send an identification friend or foe (IFF) signal at it. If it responds correctly, it is treated as friendly, but otherwise unknown. Challenges here include the interrogation becoming a source of electronic targeting for the enemy, and trusting a response.
2. "Don't shoot me" systems use a mesh of IFF interrogators that send challenges at a given position. Friendly forces identify in response, and the interrogators share the data. This may not work in terrain that may mask the challenge, response, or response sharing.
3. Situational awareness systems rely on periodic updates of positional data to help users locate friendly forces, as long as the responses are timely and not masked by terrain
4. Non-cooperative target recognition systems measure signature using acoustic and thermal radiation, radio emissions, radar techniques, etc. Comparing the measurements to classic MASINT signatures characterize the target.

Radar offers the potential of non-cooperative target recognition (NCTR). These techniques, which could work if IFF systems fail, have been especially secret. No one has yet proposed, however, NCTR that will be effective if a coalition partner is flying the same aircraft type as the enemy, as in Desert Storm. IFF, presumably with encryption, probably is the only answer to that problem.

One open-literature study combined several pieces of radar information: cross-section, range, and Doppler measurements. A 1997 Defense Department report mentions "Air Force and Navy combat identification efforts focus on non-cooperative target recognition technologies, including inverse synthetic aperture radar imaging, jet engine modulation (JEM), and unintentional modulation on pulse-based specific emitters".

NCTR on JEM specifically depends on the periodic rotation of the blades of a turbine, with variations caused by the geometry of the elements of the engine (e.g., multiple rotors, the cowling, exhaust, and stators). More generally, the idea of "micro-Doppler" mechanisms, from any mechanical movements in the target structure ("micro-motion dynamics"), extends the problem to cover more than rotating aircraft structures, but also automatic gait recognition of human beings. The micro-Doppler idea is more general than those used in JEM alone to consider objects that have vibrational or other kinds of mechanical movement. The basics of JEM is described in . One non-rotational effect would be the surface vibrations of a ground vehicle, caused by the engine, which would be different for gas turbines of tanks and diesel engines of trucks. ISAR is especially useful for NCTR, since it can provide a two-dimensional map of the micromovements.

Moving surfaces cause amplitude, Doppler frequency, and pulse modulation of the return. The amplitude modulation comes from moving surfaces of different reflectivity and angle of reflection. Doppler shifting of the returned signals is a function of the radar carrier frequency, as well as the speed of the radar source and target, with positive Doppler shift from surfaces moving toward the illuminator and negative shift of surfaces moving away from it. Moving surfaces impose a pulse width modulation.

Detecting modulation depends on the angle of the source versus the target; if the source is too far off-center with a turbine or other moving surface, the modulation may not be evident because the moving part of the engine is shielded by the engine mounting. Modulation increases, however, when the source is at right angles to the axis of rotation of the moving element of the target. For fully exposed moving elements, (e.g., propeller blades or helicopter rotors), modulation is a function of the radar beam being off-center to the center of the moving element.

== Multistatic radar MASINT ==
The first radars used separate antennas for transmitting and receiving, until the development of the diplexer allowed the antenna to be shared, producing much more compact radar systems. Until the development of low-observability "stealth" technologies, compact antenna size was prized.

One of the first principles of stealth technology was to shape the surface of aircraft so that they did not reflect the transmitted beam directly back at the shared antenna. Another technique was to absorb some of the radar in the coating of the aircraft.

The more separate radar receiving antennas there are, the more likely it is that a reflection will go to a receiver distant from the transmitter. The graphic shows the terminology in bistatic radar, with a separate receiver and transmitter.

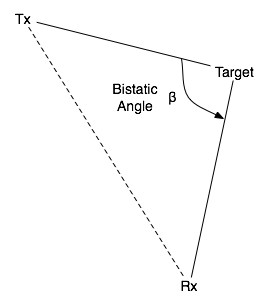
Bistatic radar theory

=== Passive covert radar ===
Human activities generate a great deal of radio energy, as in communications, navigation, and entertainment applications. Some of these sources provide enough energy such that their reflection or transillumination can enable passive covert radar (PSR) MASINT, which is also called passive coherent location (PCL).

A foreign transmitter, preferably a purpose-built radar transmitter such as used in air traffic control, but really any powerful transmitted such as TV or FM, potentially can produce reflected signals that do not return to the designated receiver of the foreign radar operator. A signal may reflect such that it can be intercepted and fed into a friendly radar receiver, giving at least information on the presence of a radar target illuminated by the foreign transmitter. This is the simple case with the unintended reflection going to a single radar support receiver.

Interferometry is also possible with such systems. This is especially attractive for naval vessels, which, since they often travel in groups, will have different times difference of arrival (TDOA) of the reflections from the foreign receiver. To restate an important difference, basic PCR works with a single radar receiver and conventional display format, from a single reflection. TDOA works with a set of reflections, from the same target, arriving at multiple points. "Passive sensors are shown to make a valuable contribution to the air defence mission."

Another group evaluated the PCR technology in an environment like that of a naval task group Ships have more space, and thus the equipment and power are less limited than for airborne or man-portable systems. This British study tested illumination with a Watchman air traffic control pulse doppler radar, and a Bridgemaster marine radar, against experimental receiver types. The researchers also developed simulations of the system.

Against the marine transmitter, the receiver combined a square-law: Power-level detector with cross-collation of a local copy of the pulse against the received signal. This method improved sensitivity for poorer time resolution, because correlated peaks are twice the width of uncorrelated peaks.

Using the air traffic control illuminator, the receiver used pulse compression filtering of a chirp signal, which provided processing gain along with the ability to separate closely spaced targets. This also implemented a moving target indicator that suppressed clutter, but it was recognized that an MTI signal would not be available in a noncooperative environment. They concluded their work demonstrated feasible convergence of PCR and TDOA, using a shipborne R-ESM system with communications among the receivers, such that the processed signal is an interferometric process.
