= Vladimir Rokhlin =

Vladimir Rokhlin may refer to:

- Vladimir Abramovich Rokhlin (1919–1984), Soviet mathematician
- Vladimir Rokhlin Jr. (born 1952), mathematician and computer scientist, son of Vladimir Abramovich Rokhlin
