= Leslie Greengard =

American mathematician (born 1957)

- Born: Leslie Frederick Greengard; 1957 (age 68–69); London, United Kingdom
- Education: Wesleyan University; Yale University
- Known for: Fast multipole method
- Father: Paul Greengard
- Relatives: Chris Chase (aunt)
- Scientific career
- Fields: Applied mathematics
- Workplaces: Courant Institute of Mathematical Sciences; Flatiron Institute
- Thesis: The Rapid Evaluation of Potential Fields in Particle Systems (1987)
- Doctoral advisor: Martin Schultz; Vladimir Rokhlin Jr.

Leslie Frederick Greengard (born 1957) is an American mathematician, physicist and computer scientist. He is co-inventor with Vladimir Rokhlin Jr. of the fast multipole method (FMM) in 1987, recognized as one of the top-ten algorithms of the 20th century.

Greengard was elected as a member of the National Academy of Engineering in 2006 for work on the development of algorithms and software for fast multipole methods.

== Short biography ==
Leslie Frederick Greengard was born in 1957 in London, England, but grew up in the United States in New York City, Boston, and New Haven. He holds a B.A. in mathematics from Wesleyan University (1979), an M.D. from the Yale School of Medicine (1987), and a Ph.D. in computer science from Yale University (1987).

From 2006 to 2011, Greengard was director of the Courant Institute of Mathematical Sciences, an independent division of the New York University (NYU) and is currently a professor of mathematics and computer science at Courant. He is also a professor at New York University Tandon School of Engineering and the director of the Simons Center for Data Analysis.

He formerly served as the Director at the Center for Computational Biology at the Flatiron Institute. As of October 2018, he has assumed the directorship of the new Center of Computational Mathematics at the Institute.

He is the son of neuroscientist Paul Greengard and the nephew of Irene Kane, later known as Chris Chase, an actress, writer, and journalist.

== Awards and honors ==
- 2016, fellow of the American Academy of Arts and Sciences
- 2014, Von Neumann Lecture, Society for Industrial and Applied Mathematics
- 2011, Wilbur Cross Medal
- 2010, Plenary Speaker, SIAM Annual Meeting
- 2010, "National Security Science and Engineering Faculty Fellowship", from the U.S. Department of Defense (DoD)
- 2006, elected to the U.S. National Academy of Engineering
- 2006, elected to the U.S. National Academy of Sciences
- 2005, Plenary Speaker, 2nd National Congress on Applied and Industrial Mathematics (France)
- 2004, "Margaret and Herman Sokol Faculty Award in the Sciences" from the New York University
- 2001, Leroy P. Steele Prize for Seminal Contribution to Research from the American Mathematical Society (together with Vladimir Rokhlin), for their paper describing a new algorithm: the fast multipole method (FMM)
- 2000, Plenary Speaker, SIAM Conference on Computational Science & Engineering
- 1999, Plenary Speaker, International Congress on Industrial and Applied Mathematics
- 1998, Invited Speaker, International Congress of Mathematicians
- 1990, "Fellowship for Science and Engineering" from the Packard Foundation
- 1990, Presidential Young Investigator Award from the National Science Foundation
- 1987–1989, "Mathematical Sciences Postdoctoral Research Fellowship" from the National Science Foundation
- 1987, Council of Graduate Schools/University Microfilms International Distinguished Dissertation Award, for his PhD. dissertation "The Rapid Evaluation of Potential Fields in Particle Systems"
- 1987, "Doctoral Dissertation Award", Series Winner from the Association for Computing Machinery
- 1987, Sandoz Thesis Award from the Yale School of Medicine
- 1979–1986, Public Health Service – National Research Service Award Medical Scientist Training Program
