= BoomSAR =

US Army UWB SAR radar

The boomSAR is a mobile ultra-wideband synthetic aperture radar (UWB SAR) system designed by the U.S. Army Research Laboratory (ARL) in the mid-1990s to detect buried landmines and IEDs. Mounted atop a 45-meter telescoping boom on a stable moving vehicle, the boomSAR transmits low frequency (50 to 1100 MHz) short-pulse UWB signals over the side of the vehicle to scope out a 300-meter range area starting 50 meters from the base of the boom. It travels at an approximate rate of 1 km/hour and requires a relatively flat road that is wide enough to accommodate its 18 ft-wide base.

== Characteristics ==
The boomSAR is a fully polarimetric system that transmits and receives low-frequency waveforms with over 1 gigahertz of usable bandwidth, covering a spectrum from approximately 40 MHz to 1 GHz. Its testbed radar subsystems consist of the antennae, the transmitter, the analog-to-digital (A/D) converter, the processor/data storage system, the timing and control assembly, the MOCOMP subsystem, and the operator interface computer. Much of these components are modular in nature for easy modification and upgrades and were constructed with commercial-off-the-shelf (COTS) technology to reduce costs.

=== Boom platform ===
The boom lift platform for the boomSAR is a 150-ft-high telescoping lift device with a basket which can be moved axially and radially and is able to handle a load capacity of 500 to 1000 lbs depending on the position of the telescoping arms. Built by JLG Inc, it possesses the unique capability of base movement while the boom is extended, allowing the boomSAR to conduct data collection using simulated airborne geometry. The down-look angles to the target typically varies from 45 degrees to 10 degrees depending on the range to the target and the height of the boom.

=== Antennas ===
The boomSAR utilizes two transmitting and two receiving antennas to provide the full polarization matrix (HH, HV, VH, VV) in a quasi-monostatic sense. All four antennas are 200 W, open-sided, and resistively terminated TEM horn antennas that are about two meters long with a 0.3-meter aperture. Since the subsystems were designed specifically for low-frequency UWB SAR application, the TEM horn antennas have a wide beamwidth in excess of 90 degrees and are fitted with a high-power, wide-bandwidth balun that can handle the 2-MW peak pulse of the impulse transmitter. According to later data, this antenna/balun combination is capable of transmitting a short-pulse UWB signal with a bandwidth from 40 MHz to over 2000 MHz with a pulse repetition frequency up to 1 kHz through the four TEM horn antennas.

=== Motion Compensation (MOCOMP) system ===
The boomSAR MOCOMP system consists of a computer and a geodimeter, which accounts for the motion compensation and positioning of the radar in three-dimensional space. The geodimeter consists of a robotic laser-ranging theodolite set up on one end of the aperture, a retro-reflector mounted on the boom lift platform near the antennas, and a control unit mounted on the base of the boom lift. As the retro-reflector moves with the boom lift platform, the theodolite tracks the horizontal and vertical angular positions of the retro-reflector and measures its range. The position of the retro-reflector is then transmitted to the geodimeter control unit using an FM radio link updated at a rate of 2.5 Hz. The control unit then proceeds to transmit the position information to the MOCOMP computer.

=== Processing System ===
The processing system relies on a VME card-cage with a Sun SPARC 5 host and eight Intel i860-based CSPI Supercard array processors to obtain the computational power needed to presume, filter, and back-project the range profiles to form the SAR image. Image processing for the boomSAR occurs in the field immediately after data collection. In order to accommodate the boomSAR's very wide bandwidth for data transfer and parallel processing opportunities, scientists at the U.S. Army Research Laboratory have investigated the use of Mercury parallel processors.

=== Analog-to-Digital converter ===
The A/D subsystem consists of a pair of Tektronix/Analytek VX2005C, 2 Gsamples/sec A/D converters, and a stable reference clock. It acts as a wide-band receiver for the radar and is uniquely capable of providing the time difference between the sample clock and the trigger event with 10 ps resolution.

UWB Radar Performance Characteristics in 1911
Feature	BoomSAR
Data collection time/aperture	1.0 km/hour
Power	2 MW peak
PRF	750 Hz
System bandwidth	40 MHz to 1.0 GHz
Processor	2 x 6 i860 processors
Data storage capability	3600 MB
A/D data transfer rate	10 MB/s
Motion Compensation system	Embedded data

== Development ==
The boomSAR originated as an extension of the railSAR, a rail-guided UWB SAR system built on the rooftop of an ARL building. Once the railSAR displayed promising results from early foliage and ground penetration field trials, plans were made to transition the railSAR technology onto a mobile platform. The initial goal behind the development of the boomSAR was to emulate the functions of an airborne radar system in order to better understand its full potential. Unlike an airborne system, the boomSAR provided a cost-effective method of determining the upper bound of performance for this approach to radar through precisely controlled and repeatable experiments.

In 1999, ARL collaborated with researchers in academia and industry to develop modeling and processing algorithms for the boomSAR. These include models for method of moments (MoM) and fast multipole method (FMM), which contributed to the development of automatic target recognition algorithms for penetration systems.

The boomSAR technology was later repurposed by the U.S. Army Research Laboratory to develop the UWB Synchronous Impulse Reconstruction (SIRE) radar, which mounted the SAR system on an all-terrain vehicle without the boom lift.

== Testing ==
=== Aberdeen Proving Ground Test ===
In 1995, an initial data collection trial for the boomSAR was conducted at Aberdeen Proving Ground (APG) in Maryland to test its foliage and ground penetration capabilities. The testing site was characterized by a deciduous forest of varying density as well as straight and curved roads through the foliage that could accommodate the width of the boom lift. During the test, canonical targets and tactical targets were hidden in the forest or buried in the soil for the boomSAR to detect. The canonical targets included dipoles, trihedrals, and dihedrals arranged to test both radar calibration and performance, while tactical targets consisted of commercial utility cargo vehicles and HMMWVs placed around the site.

The data collected from the APG test was later used to study methods for distinguishing vehicles from background clutter. Analysts determined that trees and vehicles have different frequency characteristics and that the difference in characteristics could aid automatic target discrimination processing.

=== Yuma Proving Ground Test ===
In the late 1990s, two separate data collection efforts were conducted at Yuma Proving Ground in Arizona and Eglin Air Force Base in Florida as part of a research initiative sponsored by the Strategic Environmental Research and Development Program (SERDP) to enhance the detection of unexploded landmines.

At Yuma Proving Ground, the trials were held at the Steel Crater Test Site, which partly overlapped with the neighboring Phillips Drop Zone and divided the area into two sections. The section overlapping the Phillips Drop Zone featured an almost homogeneous soil layer and was virtually free of vegetation due to the soil having been turned over to a depth of about 2 feet. In contrast to the plowed section, the natural section was relatively untouched. During the test, the plowed section had more than 600 inert targets buried in the ground such as artillery shells, rockets, mortar shells, submunitions, bombs, and mines (M-20 anti-tank mines and Valmara 69 mines) as well as false targets like magnetic rocks, animal burrows, and soda cans. These inert targets were buried at different depths (surface to 2 meters deep) and entry angles (0 to 90 degrees) in order to provide a comprehensive performance evaluation for the boomSAR. On the other hand, the natural section predominantly featured tactical targets like vehicles, although it also had some mines, wires, and pipes hidden as well. The boomSAR was tasked with detecting the targets while driving down the nearby Corral Road.

According to the results of the trial, the M-20 mines were visible in both frequency bands when they were placed close to the surface, those that were deeply buried could not be detected in the high frequency band. On the other hand, the Valmara 69 mines could not be detected in the low frequency band but were somewhat visible in the high band. For this data, the researchers concluded that the boomSAR was better suited for using lower frequencies to find the deeply buried M-20 mines and higher frequencies for detecting the much smaller Valmara mines.

== See also ==
- Ultra-wideband
- RailSAR
- SIRE radar
- SAFIRE radar
