= Activating function =

Approximation of the effect of an electric field on neurons

The activating function is a mathematical formalism that is used to approximate the influence of an extracellular field on an axon or neurons. It was developed by Frank Rattay and is a useful tool to approximate the influence of functional electrical stimulation (FES) or neuromodulation techniques on target neurons. It points out locations of high hyperpolarization and depolarization caused by the electrical field acting upon the nerve fiber. As a rule of thumb, the activating function is proportional to the second-order spatial derivative of the extracellular potential along the axon.

== Equations ==
In a compartment model of an axon, the activating function of compartment n, $f_n$, is derived from the driving term of the external potential, or the equivalent injected current

$f_n=1/c\left( \frac{V^e_{n-1}-V^e_{n}}{R_{n-1}/2+R_{n}/2} + \frac{V^e_{n+1}-V^e_{n}}{R_{n+1}/2+R_{n}/2} + ... \right)$,

where $c$ is the membrane capacity, $V^e_n$ the extracellular voltage outside compartment $n$ relative to the ground and $R_n$ the axonal resistance of compartment $n$.

The activating function represents the rate of membrane potential change if the neuron is in resting state before the stimulation. Its physical dimensions are V/s or mV/ms. In other words, it represents the slope of the membrane voltage at the beginning of the stimulation.

Following McNeal's simplifications for long fibers of an ideal internode membrane, with both membrane capacity and conductance assumed to be 0 the differential equation determining the membrane potential $V^m$ for each node is:

$\frac{dV^m_n}{dt}=\left[-i_{ion,n} + \frac{d\Delta x}{4\rho_i L} \cdot \left( \frac{V^m_{n-1}-2V^m_n+V^m_{n+1}}{\Delta x^2}+ \frac{V^e_{n-1}-2V^e_{n}+V^e_{n+1}}{\Delta x^2} \right) \right] / c$,

where $d$ is the constant fiber diameter, $\Delta x$ the node-to-node distance, $L$ the node length $\rho_i$ the axomplasmatic resistivity, $c$ the capacity and $i_{ion}$ the ionic currents. From this the activating function follows as:

$f_n=\frac{d\Delta x}{4\rho_i Lc} \frac{V^e_{n-1}-2V^e_{n}+V^e_{n+1}}{\Delta x^2}$.

In this case the activating function is proportional to the second order spatial difference of the extracellular potential along the fibers. If $L = \Delta x$ and $\Delta x \to 0$ then:

$f=\frac{d}{4\rho_ic}\cdot\frac{\delta^2V^e}{\delta x^2}$.

Thus $f$ is proportional to the second order spatial differential along the fiber.

== Interpretation ==
Positive values of $f$ suggest a depolarization of the membrane potential and negative values a hyperpolarization of the membrane potential.
