= Vladimir Rokhlin Jr. =

Russia-American applied mathematician, co-inventor fast multipole method

- Born: August 4, 1952 (age 74); Voronezh, Russian SFSR, Soviet Union
- Education: University of Vilnius; Rice University
- Known for: Fast multipole method
- Awards: Member, U.S. National Academy of Sciences (1999); Leroy P. Steele Prize (2001); Member, U.S. National Academy of Engineering (2008); Fellow, Society for Industrial and Applied Mathematics (2009); ICIAM Maxwell Prize (2011); Fellow, American Academy of Arts and Sciences (2016)
- Scientific career
- Fields: Numerical computation
- Workplaces: Yale University
- Thesis: Integral Equations Approach to Scattering Problems (1983)
- Doctoral advisor: John E. Dennis
- Doctoral students: Leslie Greengard

Vladimir Rokhlin Jr. (born August 4, 1952) is a mathematician and professor of computer science and mathematics at Yale University. He is the co-inventor with Leslie Greengard of the fast multipole method (FMM) in 1985, recognised as one of the top-ten algorithms of the 20th century.

In 2008, Rokhlin was elected as a member into the National Academy of Engineering for the development of fast multipole algorithms and their application to electromagnetic and acoustic scattering.

== Short biography ==
Vladimir Rokhlin Jr. was born on August 4, 1952, in Voronezh, USSR (now Russia). In 1973 he received a M.S. in mathematics from the University of Vilnius in Lithuania, and in 1983 a Ph.D. in applied mathematics from Rice University located in Houston, Texas, United States. In 1985 Rokhlin started working at Yale University located in New Haven, Connecticut, United States, where he is now professor of computer science and mathematics.

He is the son of Soviet mathematician Vladimir Abramovich Rokhlin.

== Awards and honors ==
Rokhlin has received several awards and honors, including:

- the Leroy P. Steele Prize for Seminal Contribution to Research from the American Mathematical Society in 2001 (together with Leslie F. Greengard), for their paper describing a new algorithm: the fast multipole method (FMM)
- the "Rice University Distinguished Alumni Award" in 2001
- elected a member of both the U.S. National Academy of Engineering (2008) and the U.S. National Academy of Sciences (1999)
- the IEEE Honorary Membership in 2006.
- elected to fellow of the Society for Industrial and Applied Mathematics in 2009
- the ICIAM Maxwell Prize from the International Council for Industrial and Applied Mathematics in 2011
- The William Benter Prize in Applied Mathematics from the Liu Bie Ju Centre for Mathematical Sciences in 2014
- Fellow of the American Academy of Arts and Sciences, 2016
