= SIRE Radar =

Radar system

The Synchronous Impulse Reconstruction (SIRE) radar is a multiple-input, multiple-output (MIMO) radar system designed to detect landmines and improvised explosive devices (IEDs). It consists of a low frequency, impulse-based ultra-wideband (UWB) radar that uses 16 receivers with 2 transmitters at the ends of the 2 meter-wide receive array that send alternating, orthogonal waveforms into the ground and return signals reflected from targets in a given area. The SIRE radar system comes mounted on top of a vehicle and receives signals that form images that uncover up to 33 meters in the direction that the transmitters are facing. It is able to collect and process data as part of an affordable and lightweight package due to slow (40 MHz) yet inexpensive analog-to-digital (A/D) converters that sample the wide bandwidth of radar signals. It uses a GPS and Augmented Reality (AR) technology in conjunction with camera to create a live video stream with a more comprehensive visual display of the targets.

The SIRE radar is part of a long generation of UWB and synthetic aperture radar (SAR) systems developed by the U.S. Army Research Laboratory (ARL) starting in the early 1990s. Past systems include the railSAR and the boomSAR systems as well as the more recent Spectrally Agile Frequency-Incrementing Reconfigurable (SAFIRE) radar system. The SIRE radar was eventually transitioned to the Communications Electronics Research, Development and Engineering Center (CERDEC) at Fort Belvoir, VA. There, it was redesigned as the ALARIC radar system, which was modified to have one fewer transmitter and operate at a bandwidth range from 100 MHz to 1.5 GHz.

== Operation ==
The SIRE radar functions primarily as a method of assessing the surrounding environment and determining whether the path being traversed is safe for vehicular navigation. In general, radar systems have an advantage over optical or laser sensor system because they are not hindered by the presence of fog or dust blocking their line of sight. However, most radar systems use high-frequency microwave radiation, which have difficulty penetrating grass and other foliage. In contrast, the SIRE radar can penetrate foliage, various media, and even the ground to detect hidden or buried IEDs due to its use of low-frequency microwave radiation.

The data acquisition cycle for the SIRE radar consist of the following steps:

1. The central computer sends commands to the timing and control board in the SIRE circuit to emit radar pulses from the left transmitter.
2. The receiver array picks up the returning radar signals, which are then digitized by the field-programmable gate array (FPGA) acquisition module and sent to the central computer along with the time tag information from the GPS receiver.
3. The data is integrated, scaled, and converted to frequency domain before being sent to the graphical user interface to be displayed.
4. The data acquisition cycle repeats with the right transmitter.

=== Transmitter ===
The transmitters used in the SIRE radar are transversal electromagnetic (TEM) horns that generate short, 1 nanosecond-long radar pulses with a pulse repetition frequency (PRF) of 1 MHz and a frequency band from 300 to 2500 MHz. The peak power output for the transmitter is 6 watts, while the average power is 5 watts to reduce interference potential. The TEM horns can handle a 200 ohm characteristic impedance and were chosen since they provide good pulse fidelity and low reflected power. The two transmitters alternate in activity with each cycle of the data acquisition process.

=== Receiver ===
The receivers used in the SIRE radar are Vivaldi notch antennas which are arranged in a uniform linear array that span the width of the vehicle. Each receiver is connected to a separate receiver channel. The imaging method relies on the back-projection algorithm, where the data from all 16 receiver channels are integrated at successive ranges as the vehicle moves forwards.

=== Radio-Frequency Interference Suppression ===
In order to prevent radio-frequency interference (RFI) from outside sources, such as radio, TV and wireless communication signals, in the radio frequency band, the SIRE radar employs several techniques to suppress or extract these signals from the UWB radar data. Instead of conventional methods of screening like the notch filtering approach, the SIRE radar narrowband and wideband RFI screening process involve averaging repeated measurements from the same range-profile.

== Modes ==
The mounted SIRE radar system comes in two modes depending on its orientation on top of the vehicle. The most commonly used mode is the forward-looking mode, where the radar faces towards the front of the vehicle in the direction it is traveling. An alternative is the side-looking mode, where the antenna frame that supports the SIRE radar system is rotated 90 degrees and the direction of the radar is perpendicular to the path of the vehicle. The side-looking mode is designed to survey the area behind walls and map the interior of enclosed buildings.

== See also ==
- Ultra-wideband
- RailSAR
- BoomSAR
- SAFIRE radar
