= SAFIRE radar =

U.S. military radar system

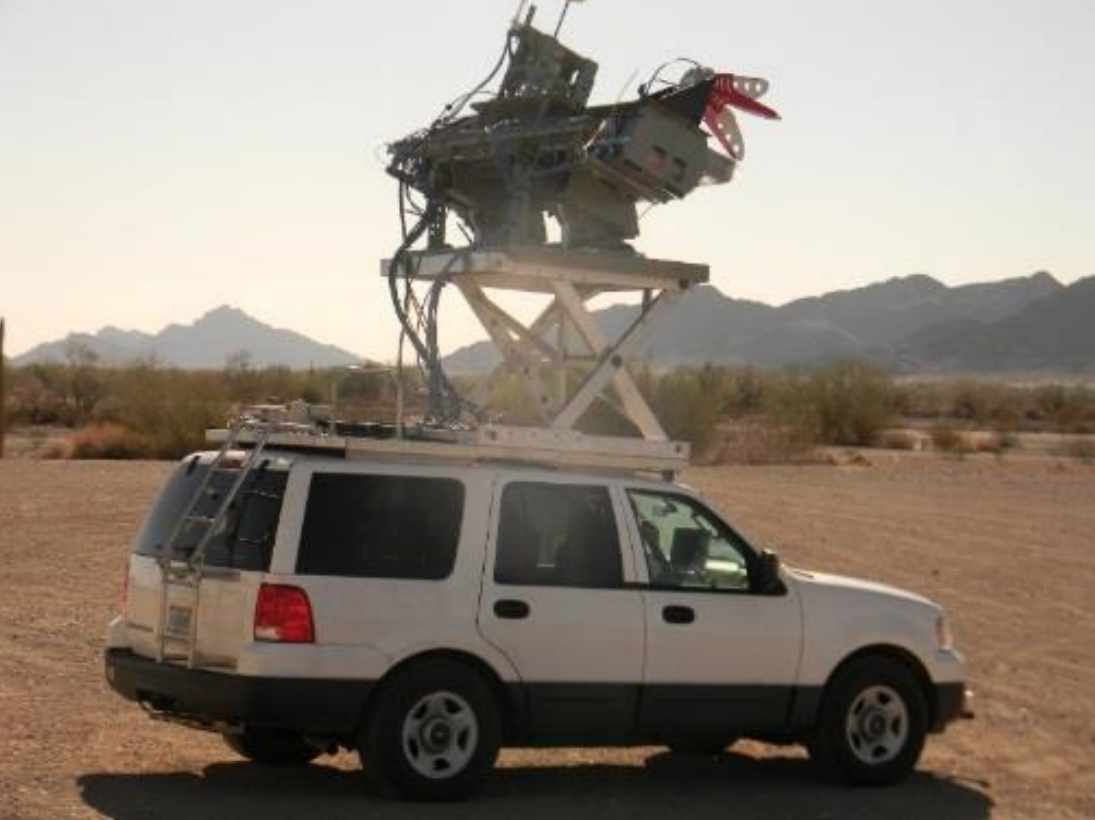
A SAFIRE radar unit under test

The Spectrally Agile Frequency-Incrementing Reconfigurable (SAFIRE) radar is a vehicle-mounted, forward-looking ground-penetrating radar (FLGPR) system designed to detect buried or hidden explosive hazards. It was developed by the U.S. Army Research Laboratory (ARL) in 2016 as part of a long generation of ultra-wideband (UWB) and synthetic aperture radar (SAR) systems created to combat buried landmines and IEDs. Past iterations include the railSAR, the boomSAR, and the SIRE radar.

== Development ==
The SAFIRE radar was initially conceived as a response to the increasing congestion of the radio frequency (RF) spectrum due to the recent growth of wireless technology. As part of an effort to improve upon the existing SIRE radar system, the U.S. Army Research Laboratory designed the SAFIRE radar as a UWB radar that could match or exceed the performance of the SIRE radar while operating in congested RF environments. Instead of impulse UWB, it was fitted with a stepped-frequency design in order to retain spectral agility while maintaining minimal ADC sampling requirements. The SAFIRE radar was also designed to be highly reconfigurable due to its nature as an experimental radar.

The SAFIRE radar differs from past UWB SAR systems developed by ARL like the boomSAR and the SIRE radar in that it utilizes a stepped-frequency system rather than a short-pulse one. One of the main challenges caused by the nature of the SIRE radar as an impulse UWB system was its high susceptibility to in-band radio frequency interference (RFI). In contrast, stepped-frequency radars can excise specific frequencies within their operating band, which reduces interference from nearby radar systems. In addition, the frequency bands where RFI is present can be easily removed with the use of spectral sensing techniques. Furthermore, while impulse UWB radars like the SIRE radar must avoid transmitting signals in certain reserved frequency bands, stepped-frequency radars possess the flexibility to transmit signals that conform to any spectral shape, so long as the return signals are processed to minimize the noise. The resulting radar imagery of this approach may feature bands of frequencies over the operating bandwidth with no data as a consequence.

Due to these configurations, the SAFIRE radar is capable of performing ultra-wideband operations with comparable range resolution and penetration abilities while avoiding spectral areas congested with high RF content. Once development was completed, the SAFIRE radar was later subjected to a series of field trials at an arid Army test site in 2016 and 2017, where it was tasked with detecting several anti-tank landmines hidden throughout the site and buried at different depths. According to the results of these experiments, the SAFIRE radar was shown to be capable of detecting and imaging broadside-oriented landmines that were buried as deep as 8 inches in the soil.

Recent analyses of SAFIRE data collection and performance continue to refine its signal processing and operational capabilities. Continued work on processing forward- and side-looking data has been reported, illustrating the system’s ability to adapt its frequency usage and data collection strategies for enhanced target imaging and evaluation in complex environments.

== Characteristics ==
The SAFIRE radar operates at a bandwidth ranging from 300 MHz to 2 GHz with a minimum frequency step size of 1 MHz. However, the frequency step size can be set by the user and is generally governed by the speed of the vehicle on which the system is mounted. While an increase in bandwidth may improve the resolution and the signal-to-clutter ratio, SAFIRE's radar resolution was specifically chosen to be comparable to the dimensions of a typical anti-personnel (AP) landmine. The radar system utilizes a superheterodyne architecture in order to keep the RFI further separated from the received signal within the radar operating band. It was also designed to have highly reconfigurable timing control, where the user can select the transmit and receive on/off times with 8.33 nanosecond resolution.

=== Antennas ===
The SAFIRE receiver antennas are arranged in a uniform linear array that consists of 16 ARL-manufactured Vivaldi notch antennas. Two large ETS-Lindgen quad-ridged horn transmit antennas are stationed above the array and separated from the receive antennas by radar absorbing foam. The radar system can be configured to have either a forward- or side-looking orientation, but doing so requires the Vivaldi notch antennas to be physically rotated. In contrast, the ETS-Lindgen horn antennas can be electronically switched between vertical or horizontal polarizations. Through this configuration, it becomes possible for the SAFIRE system to collect fully polarimetric data.

=== Transmitter ===
The transmitter consists of two mixing stages produce the operating frequency by mixing the three generated signals. Once filtered, the operating frequency passes through the Tx-Enable switch and then the Tx-LR switch, both of which are made out of commercial off-the-shelf components. The Tx-Enable switch is responsible for controlling the pulse width and duty cycle of the operating frequency and can also disable the transmitter during listen-only mode. When the SAFIRE radar is not in listen-only mode, the signal is sent to the Tx-LR switch, which is used to cycle between the left and right transmitters. A third switch called the Tx-Pol switch controls which polarization port is used after the power amplification performed by an ARL-manufactured printed circuit board (PCB), which is incorporated with AD9249 integrated circuits.

=== Receiver ===
The receiver tracks the current operating frequency during the first mixing stage using a stepped local-oscillator (LO), which is held at a constant offset to the stepped operating frequency. This first mixing stage serves to collapse the 1700-MHz operating bandwidth into a narrowband IF, which is then amplified and filtered. Once amplified, the signals are split four ways and connected to a Rx module, which consists of three PCBs and four receiver channels.

=== Cameras ===
The SAFIRE radar also features two electro-optical (EO) Point Grey Flea 2G HD cameras and two long-wave infrared (LWIR) Xenics Gobi 640 cameras. The EO cameras are capable of 2448x2048 resolution and 7.5 frames per second, while the LWIR cameras operate between 8 and 14 micrometers with 55-mK sensitivity. The data generated from these four cameras can be superimposed with the collected radar data to produce a stereoscopic augmented reality display for the user that allows them to view all the sensor data simultaneously. In addition, this data makes it possible for the SAFIRE system to generate a metric reconstruction of the scene with information about the spatial extent and proximity of the objects present. Plans were also made to combine data from the EO and LWIR cameras to create 3D metric scans of the environment complete with depth, color, thermal, and radar information to enhance the user's viewing experience.

=== Position and motion sensors ===
A GPS receiver and an inertial measurement unit (IMU) are both incorporated into the SAFIRE radar to collect and determine the position and movements of the platform as it travels on top of its designated vehicle. This information allows the system to create SAR imagery using the radar's backprojection imaging technique.

== See also ==
- Ultra-wideband
- RailSAR
- BoomSAR
- SIRE radar
