= RailSAR =

US Army UWB SAR radar system

The railSAR, also known as the ultra-wideband Foliage Penetration Synthetic Aperture Radar (UWB FOPEN SAR), is a rail-guided, low-frequency impulse radar system that can detect and discern target objects hidden behind foliage. It was designed and developed by the U.S. Army Research Laboratory (ARL) in the early 1990s in order to demonstrate the capabilities of an airborne SAR for foliage and ground penetration. However, since conducting accurate, repeatable measurements on an airborne platform was both challenging and expensive, the railSAR was built on the rooftop of a four-story building within the Army Research Laboratory compound along a 104-meter laser-leveled track.

At the time, the railSAR fell into the highest category of UWB radar systems, operating across a 950 MHz-wide band from 40 MHz to 1 GHz on a pulse strength of 2.5 megawatts. It provided fully polarimetric, high resolution radar data and possessed 185% bandwidth compared to other radar systems that had less than 25% bandwidth.

Applications of the railSAR technology range from military uses such as detecting landmines and stationary targets in hiding for reconnaissance purposes to commercial uses, including cable and pipe detection, oil and water table measurements, and environmental remediation.

== Development ==
The development of the railSAR began in 1988 as part of an exploratory research program that aimed to create technology that could detect targets camouflaged or hidden by trees and foliage cover. While early efforts faced considerable challenges, advancements in analog-to-digital (A/D) converter technology, source technology, and signal-processing power allowed ARL researchers to produce a realizable system and grasp a better understanding of foliage and ground penetrating radar. Attention was focused particularly on analyzing the basic phenomenology of impulse radar, especially the propagation effects of targets, clutter, and targets embedded in clutter.

The railSAR had four 1,35 m (4,5 ft) long, linear 200-ohm TEM horn antennas, two for transmitting and two for receiving, mounted on a rotating, non-conducting frame that was anchored on a hinged plate constructed out of aluminum honeycomb and covered in anechoic foam. The two transmit antennas were linearly polarized at ±45 degrees, and the two receive antennas had a low noise preamp and a PIN diode receiver protector. The design of the antenna was originally produced by the National Institute of Standards and Technology (NIST). An additional 0.5 meters of resistively loaded parallel plate section on the radiating end of the antennas improved the return loss at the high frequencies by absorbing some of the energy at the open aperture. An impulse transmitter behind the antenna assembly served to charge the antenna as well as discharge the antenna by using a hydrogen-pressured reed capsule to form the transmitted pulse.

An ARL-designed programmable gate-array-based system known as the timing and control (T&C) circuit provided drive signals to the transmitters and the receiver protectors. It also served to effectively reduce interference from other transmitters while also making sure to minimize interference to nearby receivers. Two computers passed GPIB (General Purpose Interface Bus) commands to the two Tektronix DSA602A digital oscilloscopes to measure the time between the trigger and the A/D clock edges and store the data on magneto-optical rewritable disks. The master computer controlled the movement of the cart on which the antennas were mounted.

In 1995, the design of the railSAR was incorporated into the development of the boomSAR in an effort to produce a mobile, high signal-to-noise radar. By 2016, the railSAR had been moved from the rooftop of the building to an indoor facility and had been subjected to several weight reductions and redesigns.

== Operation ==
In general, radar systems perform foliage and ground penetration more effectively with lower frequencies, because longer wavelengths can penetrate opaque structures deeper than shorter wavelengths. But in exchange for greater penetration capabilities, the lower frequencies provide a lower image resolution.

Ultra-wideband radar is able to overcome this limitation in resolution by transmitting extremely narrow pulses, hence “impulse,” to obtain a sufficiently wide bandwidth. However, pulse shortness comes at the cost of peak power, so much so that the peak power per frequency drops below the threshold of frequency selective receivers. While the low power makes it difficult for eavesdroppers to detect the signal, the disadvantage of this trade-off manifests as significant increases in processing cost. In order to reliably receive a UWB signal given such low power per frequency, the UWB radar system must either open itself to noise with the use of a high sampling rate receiver, incorporate signal average which lowers the data rate, or increase to high signal transmit power which presents interference to other receivers. In addition, a wider bandwidth may increase the likelihood of false alarms.

However, the combination of low frequency and high resolution present in UWB radars proved to be extremely desirable for foliage and ground penetration, in which the increased bandwidth presented a distinct advantage over its costs. In an effort to attain the necessary frequencies for adequate penetration while balancing the processing costs associated with ultra-wideband, the railSAR was designed to identify mine clusters over very large areas rather than detect each individual mine hidden in the soil and foliage.

The railSAR was initially constructed to look north over the north parking lot of the ARL compound as its target area, which was mainly populated by deciduous trees. The radar system required about 80 hours to collect one complete aperture of high-resolution, fully polarimetric data. Its peak power was at 500 kW with a pulse repetition frequency of 40 Hz, and the average transmitted power was about 20 mW. Creating the radar image required the railSAR to limit the Fourier processing to very small patches within the image area.

Despite its use of low-frequency signals, the railSAR was capable of achieving high resolution by moving along the rail and transmitting and receiving returns in the direction perpendicular to the line of motion along the rail. During performance analysis tests, the railSAR achieved a recognition probability of 90 percent with a relatively low false-alarm rate. Closer inspection revealed that the individual false alarms were generally triggered by objects in the images rather than random noise.

== See also ==
- Ultra-Wideband
- BoomSAR
- SIRE radar
- SAFIRE radar
