= IPI =

IPI or ipi may refer to:

== Science and technology ==
- International Prognostic Index, a medical tool used in oncology to predict the outcome of lymphoma patients
- International Protein Index, a database covering information about the proteomes of humans, mice and other animals
- Integrated Pulmonary Index, a single value that describes the patient's respiratory status
- Inter-processor interrupt, a mechanism used between processors to maintain a sort of synchronization
- Intelligent Peripheral Interface, a technology for connecting storage devices to computers

== Organizations ==
- Illinois Policy Institute, a libertarian think tank based in Illinois
- Image Permanence Institute, an organization dedicated to scientific research in the preservation of recorded information
- Imperial Pacific International, a former food manufacturer and gambling holding company
- Indian Political Intelligence, the latter name of the former intelligence organisation Indian Political Intelligence Office
- Institute for Private Investors, a private membership organization that provides peer-to-peer networking and investor education
- Institute of Photogrammetry and GeoInformation, a research institute, part of the consortium of institutes operating under the aegis of Leibniz University situated in Hannover, Germany
- International Peace Institute, a research and policy development institution
- International Press Institute, a journalism organization
- Inter-parliamentary institution, a type of parliamentary assembly
- Intellectual Property Institute (United Kingdom), a UK non-profit organization
- Irish Planning Institute, a professional body
- Swiss Federal Institute of Intellectual Property, a Swiss federal agency

== People ==
- Ipi people or Kumeyaay
- Ipi (vizier), Ancient Egyptian vizier
- Ipi Morea (born 1975), Papua New Guinean cricketer
- Faqir of Ipi (born 1897), Pashtun tribal leader from Waziristan

== Other uses ==
- Industrial Production Index, an economic indicator
- Interested Parties Information, a unique identifying number assigned to each Interested Party in collective rights management
- International Payment Instruction a uniform European payment receipt
- International Procurement Instrument: see Government procurement in the European Union#Third country access
- Inwald Personality Inventory, a personality test
- Income protection insurance, an insurance policy paying benefits to policyholders who are unable to work due to illness or accident
- Ipi, Waziristan, a village in Waziristan, Pakistan
- Ipili language (ISO 639 code: ipi)
- San Luis Airport (Colombia) (IATA code IPI)

== See also ==
- Institute for Political and International Studies (IPIS)
