= Creative Planning =

American financial services company

Creative Planning, LLC
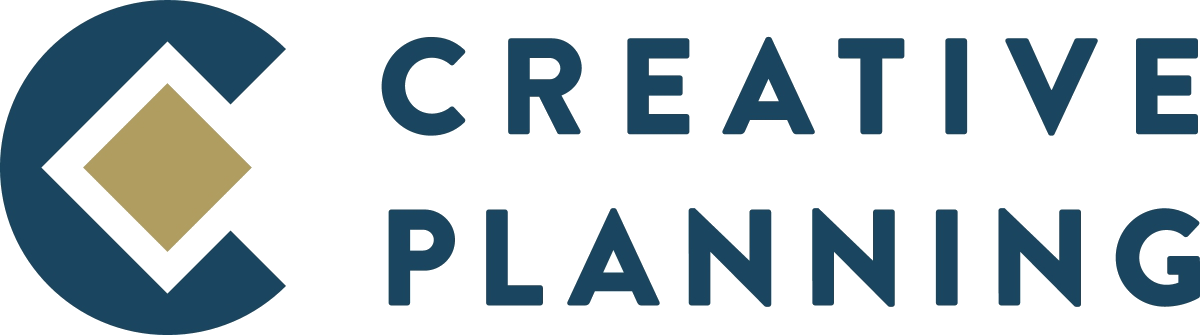
- Type: Private
- Industry: Financial services
- Founded: 1983; 43 years ago
- Headquarters: Overland Park, Kansas
- Area served: United States
- Services: Wealth management; financial planning; estate planning; tax planning; trust services; charitable giving
- AUM: US$370 billion (2025)
- Owner: Peter Mallouk
- Number of employees: 2,100 (2023)
- Website: creativeplanning.com

Creative Planning, LLC is an independent wealth management firm and registered investment advisor majority owned by American financial advisor Peter Mallouk. The firm was founded in 1983, and is headquartered in Overland Park, Kansas.

== History ==
=== Early history and growth ===
Creative Planning was founded in 1983 in Overland Park, Kansas, a suburb of Kansas City, Missouri. The business initially operated as a small division within a larger financial services provider. In 1999, Peter Mallouk began working as an estate planner for the firm and performing other consulting functions in his capacity as an attorney. He acquired Creative Planning in 2004. The division was managing $34 million in assets at the time and had around 30 clients.

Mallouk focused on growing the firm organically. By 2007, Creative Planning's assets under management (AUM) had expanded to $591 million and Barron's identified Mallouk as one of the country's top independent financial advisers. In 2011, Creative Planning reached $2 billion in AUM with around 1,200 clients. In 2014, Creative Planning surpassed $10 billion in AUM. The Kansas City Business Journal noted that Creative Planning's growth "occurred without making any acquisitions or having an affiliation with a trust company or bank."

In 2015, Barron’s ranked Creative Planning as the country's top independent financial advisor. By 2017, the company had grown its AUM to $26.2 billion with advisors located in more than 30 states, and clients in all 50 US states.

In 2018, a $200,000 fine by the U.S. Securities and Exchange Commission against the firm was the result of a series of radio advertisements heard in live and pre-recorded broadcasts by a radio show host who was a client of the firm. The host gave testimonials for the firm in violation of the Investment Advisers Act of 1940. In addition to the fine, the firm was censured and agreed to a cease and desist order. Mallouk stated that he was unaware of the content of the ads. He was also fined $50,000 at the same time, for a failure to report investments by family members in the firm.

=== Expansion and acquisitions ===
In February 2019, Creative Planning acquired The Johnston Group, a Minneapolis-based registered investment advisor (RIA) that oversaw $500 million. The deal was Creative Planning's first acquisition and represented a pivot from its strictly organic growth strategy. In a statement, Mallouk said that other wealth management firms could "fit right into our model as we continue bringing fiduciary advice to Americans from coast to coast.”

Two more acquisitions followed that same year—America’s Best 401k in September and the McLean, Virginia-based OptiFour in November. These deals expanded Creative Planning’s size and geographic reach.

In February 2020, Creative Planning accepted its first outside capital when it sold a minority stake in the firm to General Atlantic, a private equity firm. More acquisitions soon followed, including the Illinois-based Iron Financial with $6 billion in AUM and the Virginia-based Sullivan Bruyette Speros & Blayney with $5 billion in AUM. By November 2020, Creative Planning had completed 11 acquisitions for a total of $7.2 billion in assets. These deals and acquisitions that soon followed allowed Creative Planning to add or expand service offerings, including retirement plan services and expatriate services.

In April 2021, Creative Planning launched Pathway Financial Education, a Kansas City-based nonprofit organization providing financial education to small business owners and under-resourced communities. BlackRock, Dimensional Fund Advisors, and other financial advisory firms backed the initiative.

In November 2021, the firm announced that it surpassed $100 billion in AUM.

In June 2023, Creative Planning acquired BerganKDV, an accounting and wealth management firm with $2.5 billion in AUM. Barron's noted that the deal "broadened the firm’s capabilities" with tax, auditing, and business advisory services. In August 2023, Creative Planning agreed to acquire Goldman Sachs Personal Financial Management, which grew out of the investment bank's 2019 United Capital Financial Partners acquisition.

== Operations ==
In February 2017, Creative Planning began plans to move its headquarters from Leawood, Kansas, back to Overland Park. Since the move, the company has its headquarters located on a three-building campus on Interstate 435. In March 2021, Creative Planning began offering equity to approximately 10 percent of its workforce. Like other registered investment advisers, Creative Planning does not offer proprietary investments nor does it receive investment commissions.

As of 2024, the firm manages $300 billion in assets and employs 2,100 across its affiliates in all 50 states.

Peter Mallouk is the president and CEO of Creative Planning.
