= Wealth management =

Investment management and financial planning service

Modern portfolio theory suggests a diversified portfolio of shares and other asset classes (such as debt in corporate bonds, treasury bonds, or money market funds) will realise more predictable returns if there is prudent market regulation.

The wealth management industry helps rich people, including high-net-worth and ultra-high-net-worth people and families, preserve and increase their wealth. Services include tax planning, wealth protection, estate planning, succession planning, and family governance.

== Private wealth management ==
Rich people seek advice on various estate-planning vehicles, business succession or stock-option planning, and the occasional use of hedging derivatives for large blocks of stock.

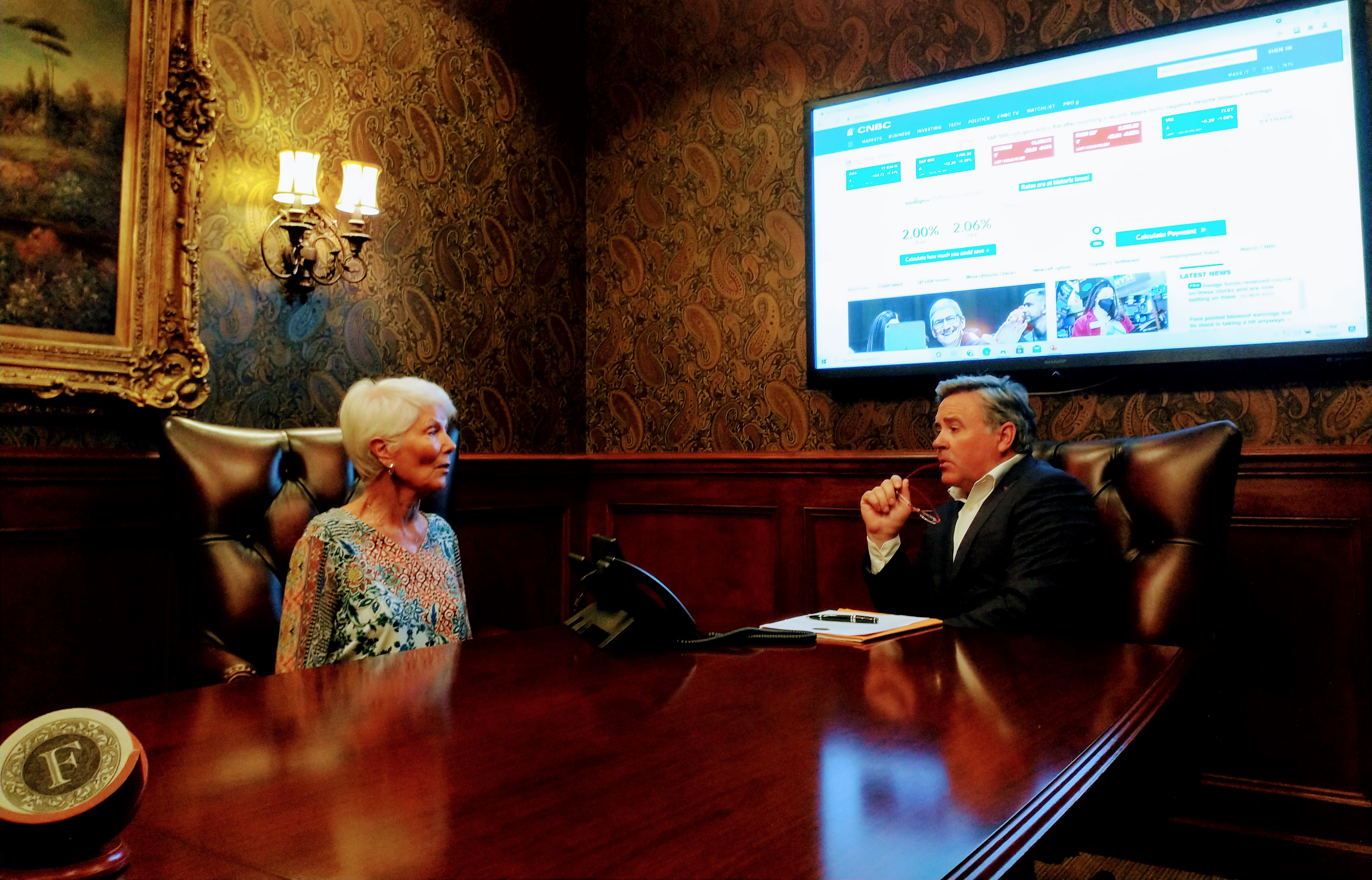
A wealth management consultation

Traditionally, the wealthiest retail clients of investment firms demanded a higher level of service, product offerings, and sales personnel than average clients received. With an increase in the number of affluent investors in recent years, there has been an increasing demand for sophisticated financial solutions and expertise throughout the world.

Rich people differ from rich institutions in two primary ways, according to the CFA Institute:

1. Time horizons differ. While institutions may last for generations, all human beings die. This fact requires strategies for transferring assets at the end of an individual's life. These transfers are subject to laws and regulations that vary by locality, and therefore, the strategies available to address this situation vary. This is commonly known as accumulation and decumulation.
2. Individuals are more likely to face a variety of taxes on investment returns that vary by locality. Portfolio investment techniques that provide individuals with after tax returns that meet their objectives must address such taxes.

The term "wealth management" first appeared as early as 1933. It came into more general use in the elite retail (or "Private Client") divisions of firms such as Goldman Sachs or Morgan Stanley (before the Dean Witter Reynolds merger of 1997), to distinguish those divisions' services from mass-market offerings, but has since spread throughout the financial-services industry. Family offices that had formerly served just one family opened their doors to other families, and the term "multi-family office" was coined. Accounting firms and investment advisory boutiques also created multi-family offices.

Certain larger firms (UBS, Morgan Stanley and Merrill Lynch) have "tiered" their platforms – with separate branch systems and advisor-training programs, distinguishing "Private Wealth Management" from "Wealth Management." The latter term denotes the same type of services but with a lower degree of customization and delivered to mass affluent clients. At Morgan Stanley, the "Private Wealth Management" retail division focuses on serving clients with more than $20 million in investment assets. In comparison, "Global Wealth Management" focuses on accounts under $10 million.

In the late 1980s, private banks and brokerage firms began offering seminars and client events to showcase the sponsoring firm's expertise and capabilities. Within a few years, new business models emerged – Family Office Exchange in 1990, the Institute for Private Investors in 1991, and CCC Alliance in 1995. These companies aimed to offer an online community and a network of peers for ultra high-net-worth individuals and their families. These entities have grown since the 1990s, with the industry increasingly investing in digital channels (such as Aladdin), technology infrastructure, and AI-driven client engagement tools.

Wealth management can be provided by large corporate entities, independent financial advisers, or multi-licensed portfolio managers who design services focused on high-net-worth clients. Large banks and large brokerage houses develop segmented marketing strategies to sell both proprietary and non-proprietary products and services to investors identified as potential high-net-worth clients. Independent wealth managers use their expertise in estate planning and risk management, along with their affiliations with tax and legal specialists, to manage the diverse holdings of such clients. Banks and brokerage firms also use advisory talent pools to aggregate and deliver these services.

The Great Recession of the late 2000s caused investors to address concerns within their portfolios. For this reason, wealth managers have been advised that clients have a greater need to understand, access, and communicate with advisers about their situation.

== Life goals ==
As awareness of wealth management has become more common, some companies have shifted towards a model that asks clients about life goals, working environments, and spending patterns as a way to increase communication. The industry-recognized wealth management was more than an investment advisory discipline. In 2015, United Capital rebranded its wealth management services as "financial life management", which, according to the company, was intended to more clearly distinguish wealth management companies from more affordable brokerage firms. The same year Merrill Lynch began a program, Merrill Lynch Clear, which asks investors to describe life goals, and includes an educational program for clients' children. For clients looking to leverage their wealth for the sake of achieving philanthropical and charitable goals, social finance investments may be included.

The 2020s saw a shift toward digital wealth management. Robo-advisory platforms expanded access to portfolio management services previously available only to high-net-worth clients, with automated investing now offered by major incumbent firms alongside specialist digital platforms. According to McKinsey & Company, global assets under management reached a record US$147 trillion by June 2025, with Asia-Pacific leading organic growth at 4.2% — more than triple the rate of the Americas. Crossborder wealth flows accelerated 8.7% in 2024, with the United Arab Emirates, Singapore, Hong Kong, and Switzerland emerging as the primary booking centres for internationally mobile wealth, according to BCG.

== Private banking and wealth management rankings ==
According to Euromoney's annual private banking and wealth management ranking 2013, which consider (amongst other factors) assets under management, net income and net new assets, global private banking assets under management grew just 10.8%YoY (compared with 16.7% ten years ago).

The largest private banks and wealth managers in the world as of 2018 are as follows:

Rank	Company	Headquarter	Assets under management
1	UBS	Switzerland	$2,403 billion
2	Bank of America Merrill Lynch	United States	$1,080 billion
3	Morgan Stanley	United States	$1,045 billion
4	Credit Suisse	Switzerland	$792 billion
5	J.P.Morgan Private Bank	United States	$526 billion
6	Citi Private Bank	United States	$460 billion
7	BNP Paribas	France	$436.7 billion
8	Goldman Sachs	United States	$394.3 billion
9	Julius Baer	Switzerland	$388.3 billion
10	China Merchants Bank	China	$292.8 billion

Note: Figures reflect 2018 data. Credit Suisse was acquired by UBS in 2023. As of 2024, global financial wealth reached a record US$305 trillion according to Boston Consulting Group's Global Wealth Report 2025, with global assets under management reaching US$128 trillion — a 12% increase from the previous year.

== See also ==
- Multi-family office
- Private banking
- Robo-advisor
