= Geological map =

Special-purpose map to show geological features

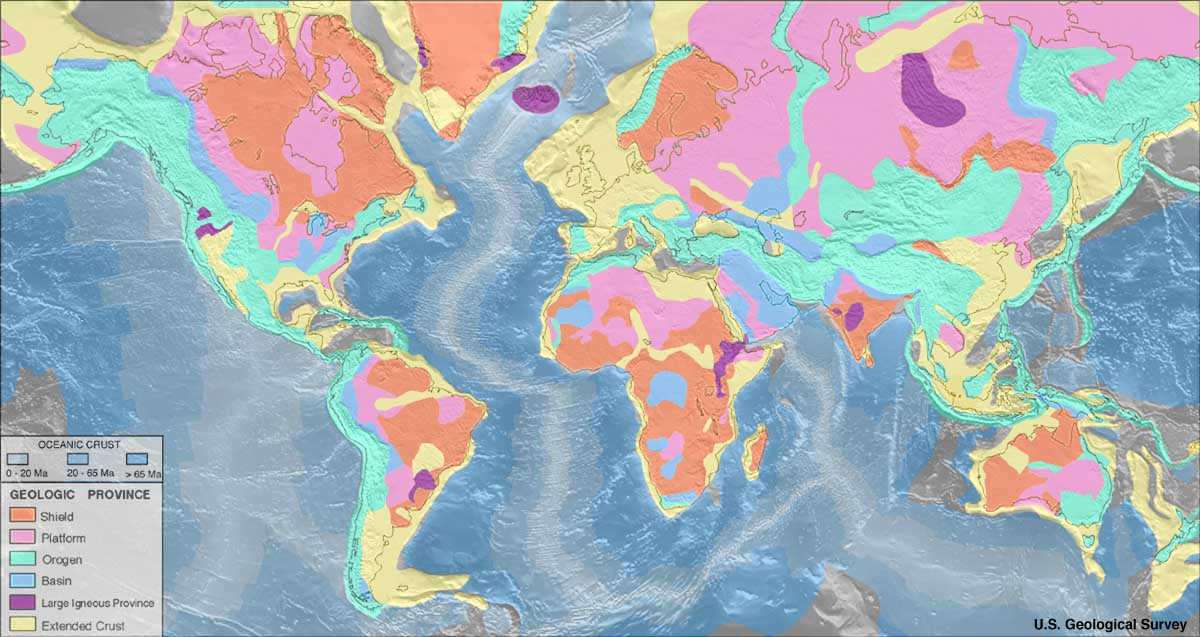
Mapped global geologic provinces

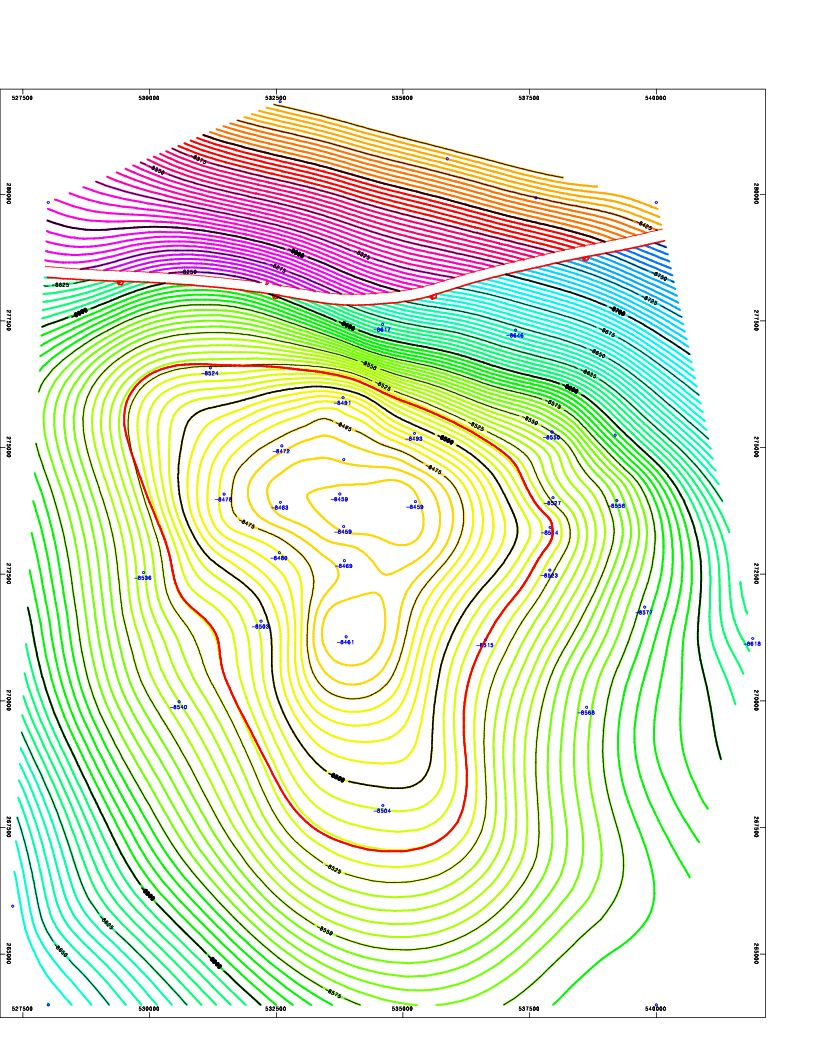
Screenshot of a structure map generated by geological mapping software for an 8500 ft deep gas and oil reservoir in the Erath field, Vermilion Parish, Erath, Louisiana. The left-to-right gap, near the top of the contour map indicates a Fault line. This fault line is between the blue/green contour lines and the purple/red/yellow contour lines. The thin red circular contour line in the middle of the map indicates the top of the oil reservoir. Because gas floats above oil, the thin red contour line marks the gas/oil contact zone.

A geological map or geologic map is a special-purpose map made to show various geological features. Rock units or geologic strata are shown by color or symbols. Bedding planes and structural features such as faults, folds, are shown with strike and dip or trend and plunge symbols which give three-dimensional orientations features. Geological mapping is an interpretive process involving multiple types of information, from analytical data to personal observation, all synthesized and recorded by the geologist. Geologic observations have traditionally been recorded on paper, whether on standardized note cards, in a notebook, or on a map.

Stratigraphic contour lines may be used to illustrate the surface of a selected stratum illustrating the subsurface topographic trends of the strata. Isopach maps detail the variations in thickness of stratigraphic units. It is not always possible to properly show this when the strata are extremely fractured, mixed, in some discontinuities, or where they are otherwise disturbed.

Digital geological mapping is the process by which geological features are observed, analyzed, and recorded in the field and displayed in real-time on a computer or personal digital assistant (PDA). The primary function of this technology is to produce spatially referenced geological maps that can be utilized and updated while conducting field work.

== Symbols ==
=== Lithologies ===
Rock units are typically represented by colors. Instead of (or in addition to) colors, certain symbols can be used. Different geological mapping agencies and authorities have different standards for the colors and symbols to be used for rocks of differing types and ages.

=== Orientations ===
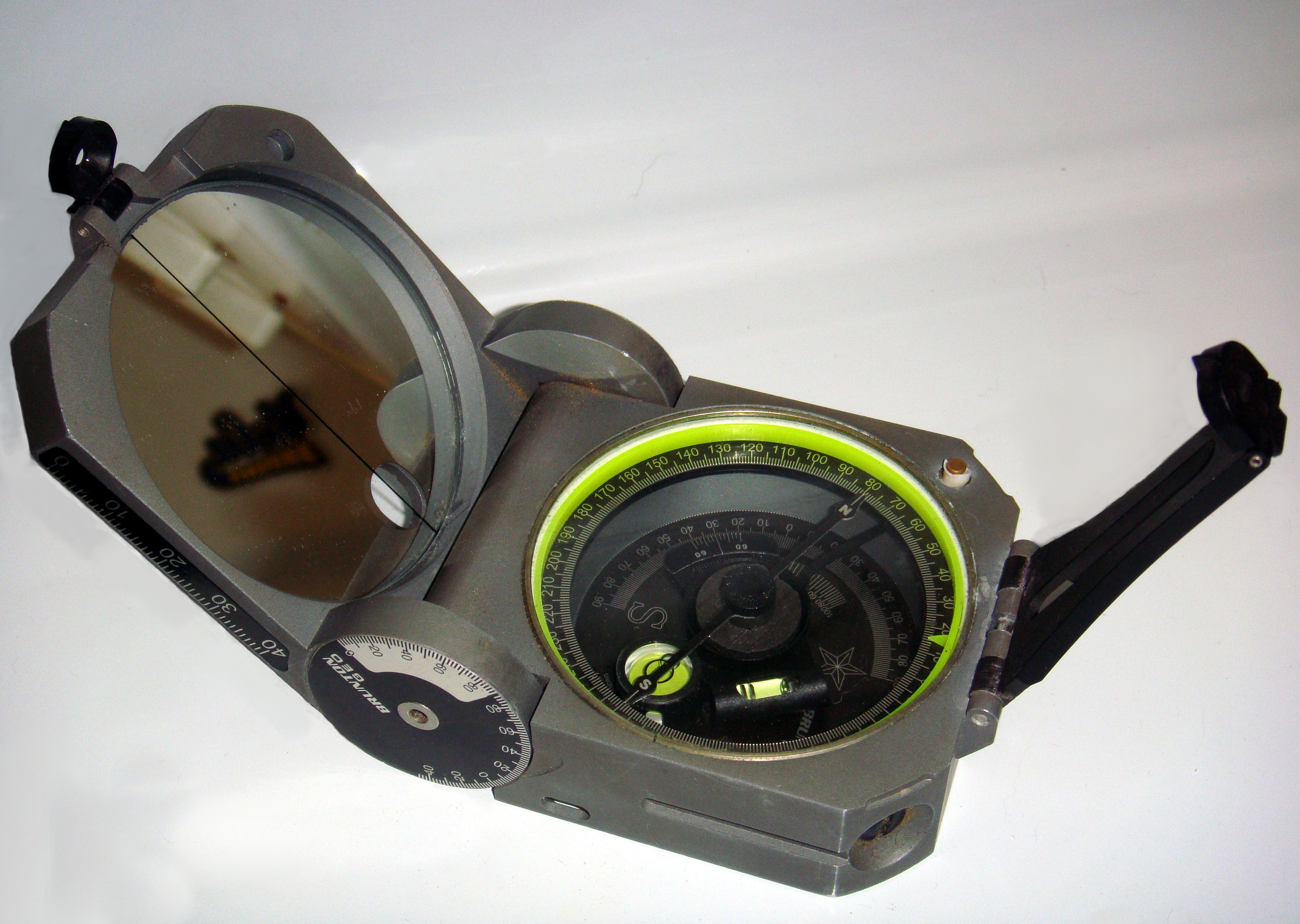
A Brunton geological compass, used commonly by geologists

Geologists take two major types of orientation measurements (using a hand compass, for example a Brunton compass): orientations of planes and orientations of lines. Orientations of planes are measured as a "strike" and "dip", while orientations of lines are measured as a "trend" and "plunge".

Strike and dip symbols consist of a long "strike" line, which is perpendicular to the direction of greatest slope along the surface of the bed, and a shorter "dip" line on side of the strike line where the bed is going downwards. The angle that the bed makes with the horizontal, along the dip direction, is written next to the dip line. In the azimuthal system, strike and dip are often given as "strike/dip" (for example: 270/15, for a strike of west and a dip of 15 degrees below the horizontal).

Trend and plunge are used for linear features, and their symbol is a single arrow on the map. The arrow is oriented in the downgoing direction of the linear feature (the "trend") and at the end of the arrow, the number of degrees that the feature lies below the horizontal (the "plunge") is noted. Trend and plunge are often notated as PLUNGE → TREND (for example: 34 → 86 indicates a feature that is angled at 34 degrees below the horizontal at an angle that is just east of true south).

== History ==
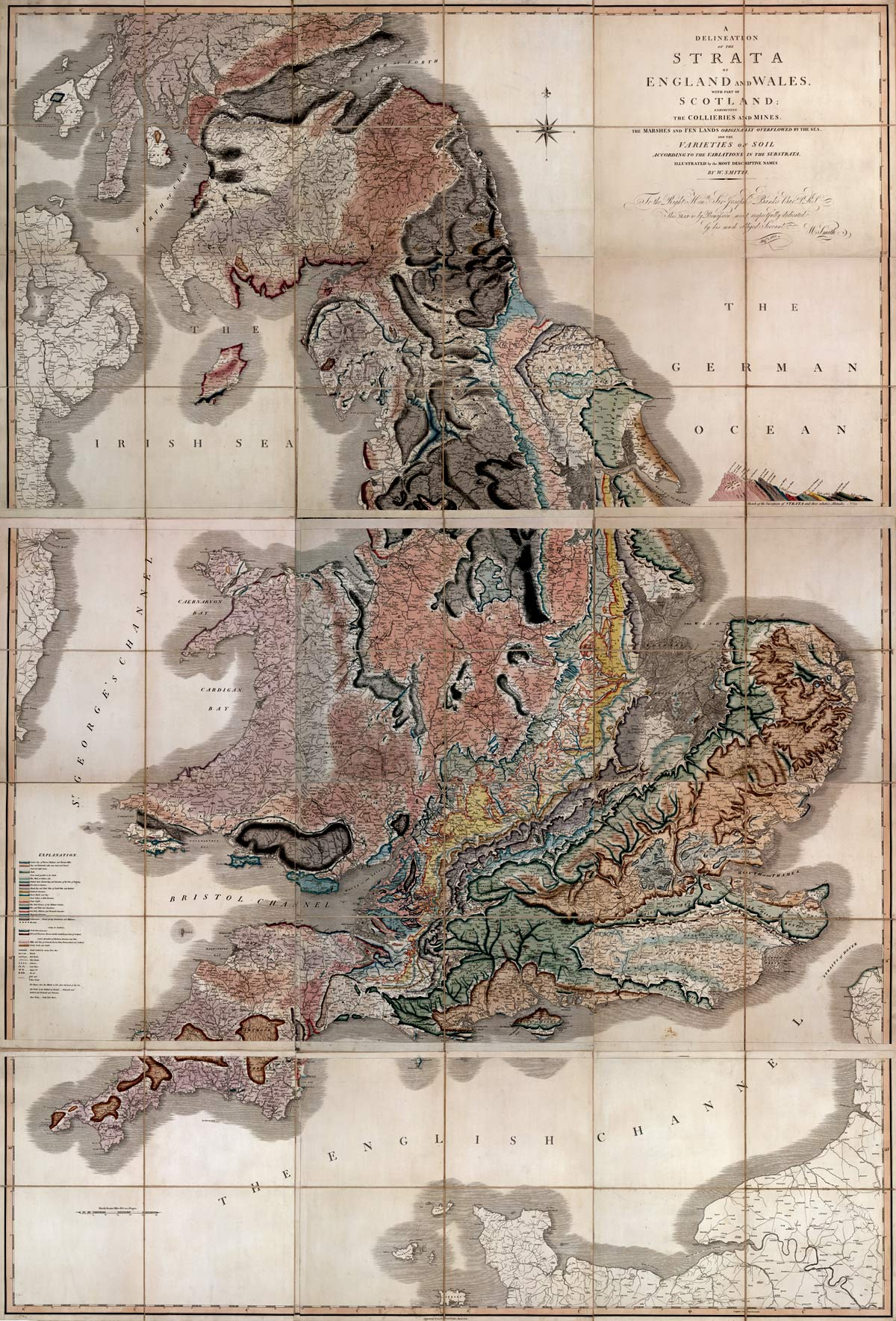
William Smith's geological map

The oldest preserved geological map is the Turin papyrus (1150 BCE), which shows the location of building stone and gold deposits in Egypt.

The earliest geological map of the modern era is the 1771 "Map of Part of Auvergne, or figures of, The Current of Lava in which Prisms, Balls, Etc. are Made from Basalt. To be used with Mr. Demarest's theories of this hard basalt. Engraved by Messr. Pasumot and Daily, Geological Engineers of the King." This map is based on Nicolas Desmarest's 1768 detailed study of the geology and eruptive history of the Auvergne volcanoes and a comparison with the columns of the Giant's Causeway of Ireland. He identified both landmarks as features of extinct volcanoes. The 1768 report was incorporated in the 1771 (French) Royal Academy of Science compendium.

The first geological map of the U.S. was produced in 1809 by William Maclure. In 1807, Maclure undertook the self-imposed task of making a geological survey of the United States. He traversed and mapped nearly every state in the Union. During the rigorous two-year period of his survey, he crossed and recrossed the Allegheny Mountains some 50 times. Maclure's map shows the distribution of five classes of rock in what are now only the eastern states of the present-day US.

The first geological map of Great Britain was created by William Smith in 1815 using principles (Smith's laws) first formulated by Smith.

=== Software history ===
Year(s) available	Field system name	Base software	Hardware used	Reference
1989–1992	MERLIN	BGS Custom	EPSON EHT400E Handheld computer	
1991-1999?	FIELDLOG	AutoCAD, Fieldworker	Apple Newton PDA	
1998–2000	G-Map	Esri Arc-View	PC & Web Based	Eni-Temars
2000–Present	GeoEditor	Esri Arc-View	PC	
2001?–2002?	GeoLink	Geolink	unknown	
2002–2010	MIDAS	ESRI's ArcPAD and BGS bespoke database	iPAQ PDAs	
2002–Present	Geopad	ESRI's ArcGIS, Microsoft OneNote, etc.	Rugged Tablet PCs and Tablet PCs	
2004–Present	Geomapper	ESRI's ArcGIS	Rugged Tablet PCs and Tablet PCs	
2004–2008	Map IT (not longer available)	Map IT	Ruggedized Tablet PC	
2006–2008	Geologic Data Assistant (GDA)	customized ArcPad 6.0.3 (ESRI)	Ruggedized PDA	
2001–2010	ArcPad	ESRI's ArcPad	Ruggedized PDA or Tablet PC	
2002?–2010	GeoMapper	PenMap	Ruggedized PDA or Tablet PC	
2006?–2010	SAIC GeoRover	Extension for ESRI's ArcGIS	Ruggedized PDA or Tablet PC	
2003–2010	GAFAG GeoRover (name protected in Europe)	Mobile geological information system	Ruggedized PDA, Tablet PC, Desktop PC, Laptop	
2000?–2010	BGS-SIGMAmobile	Customized ArcGIS, MS Access, InfiNotes	Ruggedized Tablet PC	
2008–Present	BeeGIS	Built on top of uDig	Tablet PC (ruggized or not), Desktop PC, Laptop (Win, Mac or Linux Systems)	
2011–Present	FieldMove	Midland Valley's Move	Tablet PC (ruggized or not), Desktop PC, Laptop (Windows XP or later)	
??-Present	QField	QGIS	Tablet or Smartphone	https://qfield.org/
?? - Present	Mergin Maps	QGIS	Tablet, Smartphone, Desktop PC, Laptop	https://merginmaps.com/
?? - Present	Touch GIS	Touch GIS	Tablet, Smartphone	https://touchgis.app/

== Mapping in the digital era ==
In the 21st century, computer technology and software are becoming portable and powerful enough to take on some of the more mundane tasks a geologist must perform in the field, such as precisely locating oneself with a GPS unit, displaying multiple images (maps, satellite images, aerial photography, etc.), plotting strike and dip symbols, and color-coding different physical characteristics of a lithology or contact type (e.g., unconformity) between rock strata. Additionally, computers can now perform some tasks that were difficult to accomplish in the field, for example, handwriting or voice recognition and annotating photographs on the spot.

Digital mapping has positive and negative effects on the mapping process; only an assessment of its impact on a geological mapping project as a whole shows whether it provides a net benefit. With the use of computers in the field, the recording of observations and basic data management changes dramatically. The use of digital mapping also affects when data analysis occurs in the mapping process, but does not greatly affect the process itself.

=== Advantages ===
- Data entered by a geologist may have fewer errors than data transcribed by a data entry clerk.
- Data entry by geologists in the field may take less total time than subsequent data entry in the office, potentially reducing the overall time needed to complete a project.
- The spatial extent of real world objects and their attributes can be entered directly into a database with geographic information system (GIS) capability. Features can be automatically color-coded and symbolized based on set criteria.
- Multiple maps and imagery (geophysical maps, satellite images, orthophotos, etc.) can easily be carried and displayed on-screen.
- Geologists may upload each other's data files for the next day's field work as reference.
- Data analysis may start immediately after returning from the field, since the database has already been populated.
- Data can be constrained by dictionaries and dropdown menus to ensure that data are recorded systematically and that mandatory data are not forgotten
- Labour-saving tools and functionality can be provided in the field e.g. structure contours on the fly, and 3D visualisation
- Systems can be wirelessly connected to other digital field equipment (such as digital cameras and sensor webs)

=== Disadvantages ===
- Computers and related items (extra batteries, stylus, cameras, etc.) must be carried in the field.
- Field data entry into the computer may take longer than physically writing on paper, possibly resulting in longer field programs.
- Data entered by multiple geologists may contain more inconsistencies than data entered by one person, making the database more difficult to query.
- Written descriptions convey to the reader detailed information through imagery that may not be communicated by the same data in parsed format.
- Geologists may be inclined to shorten text descriptions because they are difficult to enter (either by handwriting or voice recognition), resulting in loss of data.
- There are no original, hardcopy field maps or notes to archive. Paper is a more stable medium than digital format.

== Educational and scientific uses ==
Some universities and secondary educators are integrating digital geological mapping into class work. For example, The GeoPad project describes the combination of technology, teaching field geology, and geological mapping in programs such as Bowling Green State University's geology field camp. At Urbino University (Italy) it:Università di Urbino, Field Digital Mapping Techniques are integrated in Earth and Environmental Sciences courses since 2006 . The MapTeach program is designed to provide hands-on digital mapping for middle and high school students. The SPLINT project in the UK is using the BGS field mapping system as part of their teaching curriculum

Digital mapping technology can be applied to traditional geological mapping, reconnaissance mapping, and surveying of geologic features. At international digital field data capture (DFDC) meetings, major geological surveys (e.g., British Geological Survey and Geological Survey of Canada) discuss how to harness and develop the technology. Many other geological surveys and private companies are also designing systems to conduct scientific and applied geological mapping of, for example, geothermal springs and mine sites.

== Equipment ==
The initial cost of digital geologic computing and supporting equipment may be significant. In addition, equipment and software must be replaced occasionally due to damage, loss, and obsolescence. Products moving through the market are quickly discontinued as technology and consumer interests evolve. A product that works well for digital mapping may not be available for purchase the following year; however, testing multiple brands and generations of equipment and software is prohibitively expensive.

=== Common essential features ===
Some features of digital mapping equipment are common to both survey or reconnaissance mapping and "traditional" comprehensive mapping. The capture of less data-intensive reconnaissance mapping or survey data in the field can be accomplished by less robust databases and GIS programs, and hardware with a smaller screen size.

- Devices and software are intuitive to learn and easy to use
- Rugged, as typically defined by military standards (MIL-STD-810) and ingress protection ratings
- Waterproof
- Screen is easy to read in bright sunlight and on gray sky days
- Removable static memory cards can be used to back up data
- Memory on board is recoverable
- Real-time and post-processing differential correction for GPS locations
- Portable battery with at least 9 hours of life at near constant use
- Can change batteries in the field
- Batteries should have no "memory," such as with NiCd
- Chargeable by unconventional power sources (generators, solar, etc.)
- Wireless real-time link to GPS or built-in GPS
- Wireless real-time link from computer to camera and other peripherals
- USB port(s)

=== Features essential to capture traditional geologic observations ===
Hardware and software only recently (in 2000) became available that can satisfy most of the criteria necessary for digitally capturing "traditional" mapping data.

- Screen about 5 in × 7 in (130 mm × 180 mm)—compact but large enough to see map features. In 2009, some traditional mapping is conducted on PDAs.
- Lightweight—ideally less than 3 lbs.
- Transcription to digital text from handwriting and voice recognition.
- Can store paragraphs of data (text fields).
- Can store complex relational database with drop-down lists.
- Operating system and hardware are compatible with a robust GIS program.
- At least 512 MB memory.

=== Software ===
Since every geological mapping project covers an area with unique lithologies and complexities, and every geologist has a unique style of mapping, no software is perfect for digital geological mapping out of the box. The geologist can choose to either modify their mapping style to the available software, or modify the software to their mapping style, which may require extensive programming. As of 2009, available geological mapping software requires some degree of customization for a given geological mapping project. Some digital-mapping geologists/programmers have chosen to highly customize or extend ESRI's ArcGIS instead. At digital field data capture meetings such as at the British Geological Survey in 2002 some organisations agreed to share development experiences, and some software systems are now available to download for free.

== Maps and mapping around the globe ==
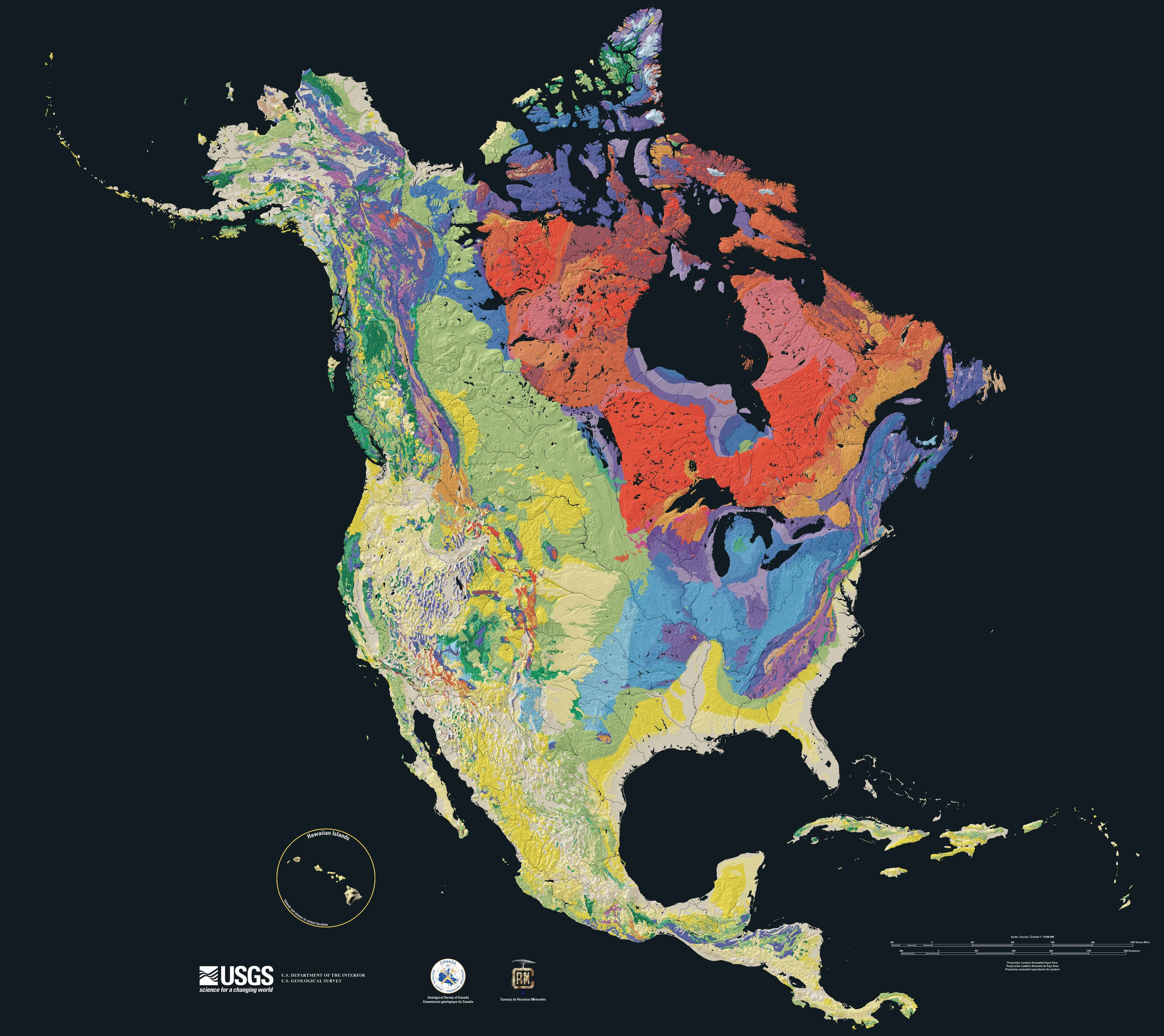
Geological map of North America superimposed on a shaded relief map

=== Singapore ===
The first geological map of Singapore was produced in 1974, produced by the then Public Work Department. The publication includes a locality map, 8 map sheets detailing the topography and geological units, and a sheet containing cross sections of the island.

Since 1974, for 30 years, there were many findings reported in various technical conferences on newfound geology islandwide, but no new publication was produced. In 2006, Defence Science & Technology Agency, with their developments in underground space promptly started a re-publication of the Geology of Singapore, second edition. The new edition that was published in 2009, contains a 1:75,000 geology map of the island, 6 maps (1:25,000) containing topography, street directory and geology, a sheet of cross section and a locality map.

The difference found between the 1976 Geology of Singapore report include numerous formations found in literature between 1976 and 2009. These include the Fort Canning Boulder Beds and stretches of limestone.

=== United Kingdom ===
The United Kingdom and Isle of Man have been extensively mapped by the British Geological Survey (BGS) since 1835; a separate Geological Survey of Northern Ireland (drawing on BGS staff) has operated since 1947.

Two 1:625,000 scale maps cover the basic geology for the UK. More detailed sheets are available at scales of 1:250,000, 1:50,000 and 1:10,000. The 1:625,000 and 1:250,000 scales show both onshore and offshore geology (the 1:250,000 series covers the entire UK continental shelf), whilst other scales generally cover exposures on land only.

Sheets of all scales (though not for all areas) fall into two categories:

1. Superficial deposit maps (previously known as solid and drift maps) show both bedrock and the deposits on top of it.
2. Bedrock maps (previously known as solid maps) show the underlying rock, without superficial deposits.

The maps are superimposed over a topographic map base produced by Ordnance Survey (OS), and use symbols to represent fault lines, strike and dip or geological units, boreholes etc. Colors are used to represent different geological units. Explanatory booklets (memoirs) are produced for many sheets at the 1:50,000 scale.

Small scale thematic maps (1:1,000,000 to 1:100,000) are also produced covering geochemistry, gravity anomaly, magnetic anomaly, groundwater, etc.

Although BGS maps show the British national grid reference system and employ an OS base map, sheet boundaries are not based on the grid. The 1:50,000 sheets originate from earlier 'one inch to the mile' (1:63,360) coverage utilising the pre-grid Ordnance Survey One Inch Third Edition as the base map. Current sheets are a mixture of modern field mapping at 1:10,000 redrawn at the 1:50,000 scale and older 1:63,360 maps reproduced on a modern base map at 1:50,000. In both cases the original OS Third Edition sheet margins and numbers are retained. The 1:250,000 sheets are defined using lines of latitude and longitude, each extending 1° north-south and 2° east-west.

=== United States ===
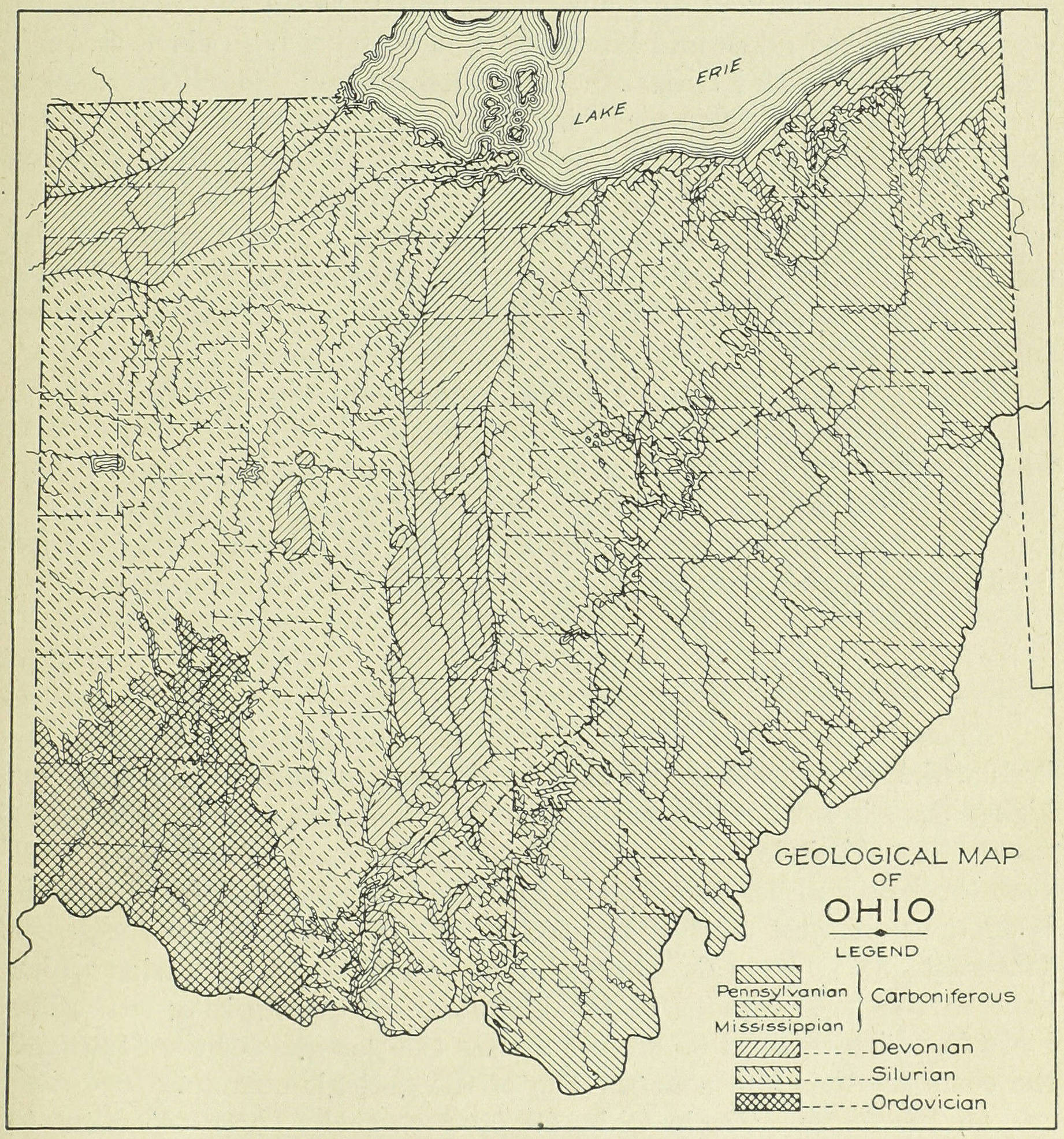
Geological Map of Ohio from "Geography of Ohio", 1923

In the United States, geological maps are usually superimposed over a topographic map (and at times over other base maps) with the addition of a color mask with letter symbols to represent the kind of geologic unit. The color mask denotes the exposure of the immediate bedrock, even if obscured by soil or other cover. Each area of color denotes a geologic unit or particular rock formation (as more information is gathered new geologic units may be defined). However, in areas where the bedrock is overlain by a significantly thick unconsolidated burden of till, terrace sediments, loess deposits, or other important feature, these are shown instead. Stratigraphic contour lines, fault lines, strike and dip symbols, are represented with various symbols as indicated by the map key. Whereas topographic maps are produced by the United States Geological Survey in conjunction with the states, geological maps are usually produced by the individual states. There are almost no geological map resources for some states, while a few states, such as Kentucky and Georgia, are extensively mapped geologically.

== See also ==
- Cross section (geology)
- Cartography
  - Computer cartography
- Geology
- Gravity map
- OneGeology
- Seabed 2030
- Aerial photograph interpretation (geology)
