= Institute of Photogrammetry and GeoInformation =

German research institute

- Established: 1881
- Field of research: Photogrammetry; geoinformation; computer vision; 3D geometry; image processing; machine learning
- Director: Christian Heipke (1998 )
- Location: Hannover, Germany

The Institute of Photogrammetry and GeoInformation (IPI) is a research institute that is part of the consortium of institutes operating under the aegis of Leibniz University situated in Hannover, Germany. The current research at IPI focuses both on terrestrial and extraterrestrial image interpretation. The basic themes of research revolve around computer vision, 3D geometry, image processing and machine learning. IPI contributes regularly with state-of-the-art methods to interpret high resolution images received from the HRSC probe of the Mars Express mission.

The institute is currently headed by Prof. Christian Heipke (since 1998) succeeding Gottfried Konecny who is a Professor emeritus at IPI.

== History ==
IPI's history goes as far back as 1881 when W. Jordan was appointed as the first professor of Geodetics at the University of Hannover. However, after the havocs of the Second World War, the academic units of the university underwent a reorganization. In 1949 IPI's two mother institutes—The Geodetic Institute, and the Institute for Photogrammetry and Engineering Surveys were established. IPI got its current name in 2001.

== Research emphasis ==
IPI's current research emphasis is a blend of interdisciplinary explorations in computer vision, 3D Geometry, image processing, and machine learning. These disciplines are employed for terrestrial and extraterrestrial image interpretation. IPI contributes regularly with state-of-the-art methods to interpret high resolution images received from the HRSC probe of the Mars Express mission.

In the past IPI was given the responsibility of Project Science Coordination for the Metric Camera Experiment on the first European Spacelab mission on the U.S. Space Shuttle.

In 1987 IPI deployed the first civilian digital photogrammetric workstation, and cooperated in the remote sensing mission MOMS 02/D2 on the U.S. Space Shuttle in 1993.

IPI is also part of the MOMS-02/P mission on the Russian space station Mir since 1996.

== Past heads ==
Past heads of the institute in reverse chronological order are:

- Christian Heipke (1998-)
- Gottfried Konecny
- G.Lehmann
- W.Großmann
- R.Finsterwalder (1942–1948)
- P.Gast (1927–1941)
- W.Jordan (1882–1899)
