= Irish Planning Institute =

The Irish Planning Institute (IPI) is an all-island professional body representing professional planners engaged in physical and environmental planning in the Republic of Ireland and Northern Ireland.

The IPI works with both its members and other built environment professionals to promote and improve the quality of planning, to represent the views of the planning profession and to contribute to education and environmental awareness in the wider community.

This is achieved through the hosting of conferences and CPD events for its members; awarding, recognising and publishing best practice; making submissions on behalf of the planning profession on national policies, governance and other relevant publications and papers; and by representing the values of planning and planning professionals in the general media.

== Activities ==
The Irish Planning Institute is an active member of the European Council of Spatial Planners and has held the Presidency of this organisation. Through this involvement, the Institute not only represents Irish planning interests abroad but also forges important links with sister institutions in Europe. It is also a member of the Global Planners Network.

The IPI inspects and accredits on invitation a number of planning courses in universities and other third level educational institutions across the island of Ireland. It is also a nominating body to Seanad Éireann and to An Bord Pleanála.

The Irish Planning Institute lobbies central Government on new legislation and on planning policy at national, regional and local levels. It also from time to time issues statements on current topics of public interest and debate.

The IPI publishes "Pleanáil" which is the only technical publication on planning theory and professional planning practice published in Ireland.

Through its annual National Planning Conference, the institute offers a major forum for the debate of planning and related topics. It also organises the National Planning Awards every two years and a series of CPD events throughout the year to promote best practice and to inform our membership regarding new approaches and policies.

== Membership ==
The Irish Planning Institute has six categories of membership: Fellowship, Corporate, Graduate, Student, Affiliate and Honorary.

Fellowship is generally awarded to professionally qualified planners who have considerable professional planning experience and who have made an important contribution to the development of the institute.

Corporate Membership, which is the main class of membership, is open to professionally qualified planners who have reached a standard of knowledge, skill and professional experience necessary to engage in planning in Ireland, in the public sector or in private practice. This class of membership is also open to qualified professional planners who are full members of the member Institutes of the European Council of Spatial Planners, and to recently qualified planners from other countries, subject to appropriate post-qualification experience, under the provisions of the European Directive on Mutual Recognition of Professional Qualifications.

Graduate Membership is available to those who have acquired an IPI accredited planning qualification and, under certain circumstances, those who have been awarded planning qualifications which have not been accredited by the IPI.

Persons engaged in a programme of formal study leading to an IPI accredited planning qualification from a planning school are eligible for Student Membership of the institute.

Affiliate Membership can be awarded to persons who have a professional qualification that is related to planning, who have been engaged in approved research or practice related to planning and who have been engaged in approved research or practice relating to planning, and who have made a special contribution to planning in Ireland.

Honorary Membership is generally awarded as an honour on an individual whose special interests have been deemed by the institute to have made an outstanding contribution to planning.

== Governance ==
The Council of the IPI, which is the governing body of the institute, is directly elected by the Members by postal ballot.

The aims of the Planning Institute are:

- To raise the standards of planning.
- To articulate professional planning opinion.
- To improve and promote the status of the planning profession.
- To contribute to planning education.
- To encourage environmental awareness in the community.
- To represent Irish planning interests abroad.

There are a number of regional and sectoral branches within the institute. The Regional Branches are: the Cork Branch, the Midland Branch, the Mid-West Branch, the Western Branch, the South Eastern Branch, the Greater Dublin Area Branch and the Northern Branch (covering members in Northern Ireland). The sectoral Branch is the Private Practice Branch, covering members working in private practice throughout the island of Ireland.
