= Institute for Private Investors =

The Institute for Private Investors (IPI) is a private membership organization that provides peer-to-peer networking and investor education for its members. The group is open to high-net-worth individuals, or families with minimum investable assets of US $30 million or more.

The organization was founded in 1991 by Charlotte B. Beyer of Charlotte Beyer Associates, Inc., and incorporated in 1997. Its mission is to improve the way investors work with advisors. The association sells no investment products or consulting services, deriving its revenue solely from membership dues and educational fees.

In 1999, IPI collaborated with the Wharton School of the University of Pennsylvania to create a five-day residential program, with Beyer among the faculty.

IPI offers access to Memberlink, a private online social networking platform to discuss investment ideas and other issues facing wealthy families.

For wealth-holders under 50, the organization offers a NextGen Membership that combines online resources with special events and educational programs to help next generation principals connect with peers.

In addition to individual private investors and families, professional service firms, such as registered investment advisors and wealth managers, can also join IPI as members, though they do not gain access to the investors' conversations and are not allowed to directly pitch or sell to members.

In 2011, IPI was acquired by London-based Campden Media.
