= Aerial image =

Film projection technique

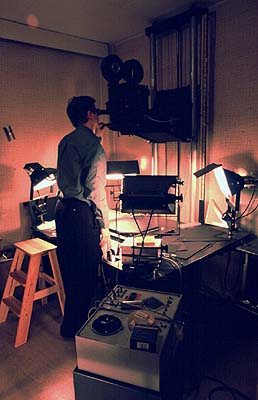
A special effects movie camera stand with aerial image capabilities.

An aerial image is a projected image which is "floating in air", and can be picked up by a second camera (recipient of the copy / printing) positioned opposite and focused on the same aerial plane. This method eliminates the use of an intervening screen, or direct projection onto another (copying) film. It also allows wider scope for special effects. The aerial image can only be seen from one position in space, often focused by another lens.

Aerial image technology was used in optical printers and movie special effects photography before the advent of computer graphics in movie production, and also for combining animation and live action footage onto one piece of film.
