= Goldman Sachs Personal Financial Management =

- Formerly: United Capital
- Type: Division
- Industry: Financial services
- Founded: 2005; 21 years ago
- Founders: Joe Duran; Bob Doede
- Defunct: 2023
- Fate: Acquired
- Successor: Creative Planning
- Headquarters: Newport Beach, California, United States
- Area served: Worldwide
- Key people: Joe Duran (CEO); Bob Doede (chairman); Jon Frojen (CFO); Matt Brinker (CBDO) Gary Roth (CFO)
- Services: Financial life management, investment management
- AUM: US$ 24 billion (2018)
- Number of employees: 487 (2023)
- Parent: Goldman Sachs; (2015–23); Creative Planning; (2023–present)
- Website: www.goldmanpfm.com

Goldman Sachs Personal Financial Management (GSPFM) was a former division of Goldman Sachs responsible for wealth management of high-net-worth individuals. It had 74 offices in the United States and managed $25 billion in assets.

In November 2023, it was announced that Creative Planning had completed the acquisition of GSPFM.

In 2021, the average customer had $1.3 million in assets managed by the division. A separate division, Goldman Sachs Private Wealth Management, serves ultra high-net-worth individuals where customers have at least $10 million in investable assets.

== History ==
Goldman Sachs Personal Financial Management was founded in 2005, under the name United Capital, as a national network of independent advisory firms. The company was initially founded, financed and developed by Joe Duran and his business colleagues.

By 2008, following several acquisitions of investment advisory firms such as Maul Capital Management, Integrated Financial Management, and Trevethan Capital Partners, United Capital was operating with 47 offices and 350 employees.

By 2010, United Capital had over 150 employees and $30 million in revenue. The company made its largest acquisition in 2012 when it acquired Zirkin, a $1.6 billion firm that was previously part of M&T Bank.

United Capital was acquired by Goldman Sachs on May 16, 2019, for $750 million and the name of the division was subsequently rebranded as Goldman Sachs Personal Financial Management on January 30, 2020.

In August 2023, Goldman Sach's agreed to sell the unit to registered investment advisor Creative Planning. The acquisition was completed in November.
