= International Payment Instruction =

The IPI (International Payment Instruction) payment slip is a uniform European payment receipt. It was developed by the ISO (International Organization for Standardization) and the ECBS (European Committee for Banking Standards). The IPI receipt was strongly supported by the European Commission and the introduction should be implemented by 1 January 2002.

The appearance of the IPI payment receipt is mandatory for all participating countries. The standardized IPI receipt can be used in virtually all European countries and with most European currencies. It enables automated payment processing and can be used for both national and international payments across Europe.

With the introduction of the SEPA payment area the IPI receipt is regarded as largely obsolete.

In Switzerland and the Principality of Liechtenstein the IPI payment slip is still used for the execution of manual SEPA payments. Electronically recorded IPI transfers are interpreted by banks as SEPA compliant payments and executed according as such.
