= Structured Geospatial Analytic Method =

The Structured Geospatial Analytic Method (SGAM) is both as an analytic method and pedagogy for the Geospatial Intelligence professional. This model was derived from and incorporates aspects of both Pirolli and Card’s sensemaking process and Richards Heuer’s Analysis of Competing Hypotheses model. This is a simplified view of the geospatial analytic process within the larger intelligence cycle.

The SGAM is intended to advance the Geospatial Intelligence tradecraft by providing an approach not only to teach the analyst how forage and repackage data, but also how to analyze the data in a meaningful way. It has been long known that without specific prompting, people may be unaware of spatial patterns of an environment and, similar to other areas of intelligence analysis, the geospatial analyst has the human tendency to:

- unconsciously discount much of the relevant information
- mentally simplify the task and likely oversimplify the results
- make judgments that are subject to unconscious biases, blind spots, and limitations of working memory.

Spatial thinking that goes beyond a simple identification of locations is key to applying the SGAM. This thinking involves comparing locations, considering the influence of nearby features, grouping regions and hierarchies, and identifying distant places that have similar conditions. It is also the consideration of change, movement, and diffusion through time and place. Spatial thinking then proceeds to examine the places and compare places in the context of space and time.

The method is organized into two major loops:

- A foraging loop aimed at seeking information foraging, searching, and filtering it, and reading and extracting information.
- a Sensemaking loop that involves iterative development of a mental model from the schema that best fits the evidence.

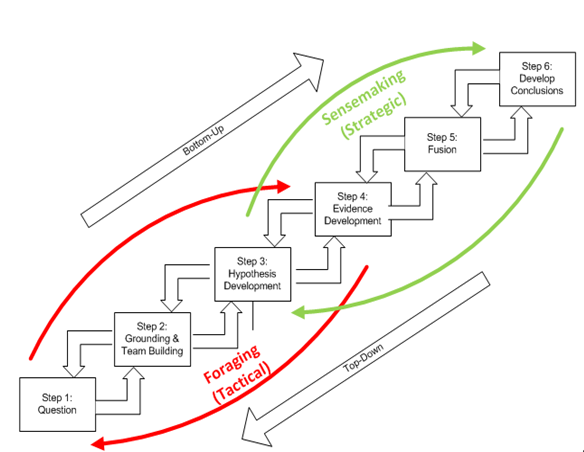
The Structured Geospatial Analytic Method (SGAM): The data flow shows the transformation of raw information to reportable results.

The foraging loop recognizes that analysts tend to search for data by beginning with a broad set of data and then proceeding to narrow that set down into successfully smaller, higher-precision sets of data, before analyzing the information. The three foraging actions including exploring for new information; narrowing the set of items that has been collected; and exploiting items in the narrow set; trade off against one another under deadline or data overload constraints. Much geospatial intelligence work may never depart from the foraging loop and can simply consist of extracting information and repackaging it without much actual analysis since the production of maps is oft the role that the analyst fulfills.

Sensemaking is the ability to create situational awareness and understanding in situations of high complexity or uncertainty in order to make decisions. It is “a motivated, continuous effort to understand connections (which can be among people, places, and events) in order to anticipate their trajectories and act effectively”. Pirolli discusses the importance of using a cooperative approach to sensemaking as it yields a greater diversity of knowledge and reduces the risk of missing relevant information. This collaborative element is essential to the SGAM, as teaming is identified as one of the steps within the overall method. The Director of National Intelligence’s (DNI) vision for 2015 is one in which intelligence analysis increasingly becomes a collaborative enterprise with the focus of collaboration shifting “away from coordination of draft products toward regular discussion of data and hypotheses early in the research phase”. This is a major change from the traditional concept of geospatial analysis as largely an individual activity, and requires the geospatial analyst to be skilled in building, leading, resourcing, and managing teams for effective outcomes.

The data flow represents the converting of raw information into a form where expertise can be applied and then out to another form suited for communication. Information processing can be driven by bottom-up processes (from data to theory) or top-down (from theory to data). The below Table provides more detail about the steps.

Step	Bottom-Up (Data to Theory)	Top-Down (Theory to Data)
1	Question: Develop the question that critically defines the broad nature of the spatial and temporal patterns the analyst is seeking to ultimately identify.	Evaluate conclusion: Generate re-evaluations of current conclusions requiring the marshaling of additional evidence to support or disconfirm the analysis.
2	Grounding and Team Building: Build a potential repertoire of prototypical geospatial and temporal patterns from which a number of hypothetical patterns are selected, and form the analytic team.	Deconstruct the synthesis: Reexamine the table of hypothesis and evidence beginning with the rankings
3	Hypothesis development: Select all the reasonably possible geospatial and temporal patterns that might match the pattern envisioned during the development of the question.	Examine the evidence: Re-examination of collected evidence or search for new evidence that may suggest new geospatial or temporal patterns.
4	Evidence Development: Extract snippets from items discovered in grounding; develop the evidence by applying schemas so that it can be used more easily to draw conclusions.	Re-evaluate the hypotheses: New hypotheses may generate new searches, further data extraction, or a search for additional raw data.
5	Fusion: Compare the evidence to each hypothetical geospatial and temporal pattern to determine consistency.	Question your own grounding in the problem: New hypotheses may cause analysts to broaden their grounding in prototypical geospatial and temporal patterns.
6	Conclusions: Propose which hypothetical pattern(s) is (are) most consistent with the evidence and answer the question.	Question the question: Revalidate with the client the nature of the geospatial and temporal patterns the analyst is ultimately seeking to identify.

It is often difficult for an analyst to determine the next step in an analytic process or to conceptualize how various techniques and tools fit together. The SGAM provides the means to relate the analytical step to the appropriate Structured Analytic Technique (SAT) and then to the appropriate geospatial operation. The below table summarizes this mapping:

SGAM Step	Structured Analytic Technique	GIS Operation
1: Question	Brainstorming	
2: Grounding	Brainstorming, Key Assumption Check, Quality of Information Check, Red Team	Data entry, Data conversion, Data validation, Spatial data management, Attribute data management, Data visualization
3: Hypothesis Development	Brainstorming, Analysis of Competing Hypotheses (ACH)	Data visualization
4: Evidence Development	Brainstorming, Quality of Information Check, Analysis of Competing Hypotheses (ACH)	Data visualization, Data processing/analysis
5: Fusion	Analysis of Competing Hypotheses (ACH)	Output of maps and reports
6: Conclusions	Analysis of Competing Hypotheses (ACH), Devil’s Advocacy	Output of maps and reports

There are several benefits:

- The SGAM is a complete framework that it takes the analyst through the important steps of the analytic process.
- Two or more analysts can go through the steps of the process independently and then compare notes.
- The SGAM's inclusion of Structured Analytic Techniques addresses biases that can impose an incorrect structure, mindset or mental picture.
