= Geospatial intelligence =

Information on military opponents' location

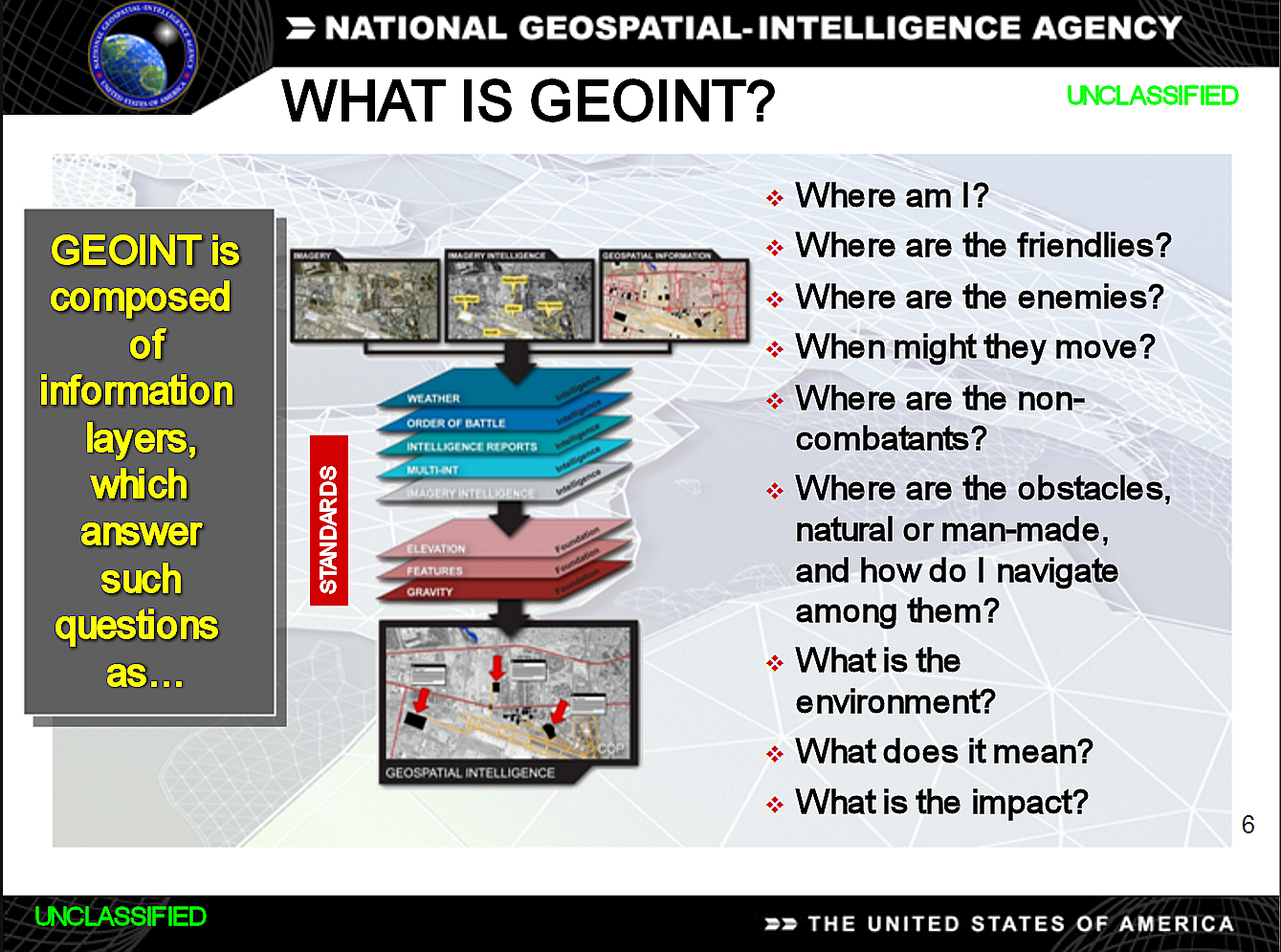
Graphical depiction of the US definition of Geospatial Intelligence (GEOINT)

Geospatial intelligence (GEOINT) is intelligence about the human activity on Earth derived from the exploitation and analysis of imagery, signals, or signatures with geospatial information. GEOINT describes, assesses, and visually depicts physical features and geographically referenced activities on the Earth. GEOINT, as defined in US Code, consists of imagery, imagery intelligence (IMINT) and geospatial information.

Today, GEOINT knowledge and tradecraft are not confined national governments, or even the world's leading military powers. Additionally, countries such as India are holding GEOINT-specific conferences. While other countries may define geospatial intelligence somewhat differently than others, the use of GEOINT data and services is the same.

Geospatial Intelligence can also be referred to as "Location Intelligence". Although GEOINT is inclusive, HYDROSPATIAL is preferably used to refer and to focus on the aquatic and coastal zones spatial elements.

== Amplified definition ==
GEOINT encompasses all forms of imagery including capabilities formerly referred to as Advanced Geospatial Intelligence and imagery-derived MASINT as well as geospatial information and services (once known as mapping, charting, and geodesy). It includes, but is not limited to, data ranging from the ultraviolet through the microwave portions of the electromagnetic spectrum, as well as information derived from the analysis of literal imagery; geospatial data; georeferenced social media; and information technically derived from the processing, exploitation, literal, and non-literal analysis of spectral, spatial, temporal, radiometric, phase history, polarimetric data, fused products (products created out of two or more data sources), and the ancillary data needed for data processing and exploitation, and signature information (to include development, validation, simulation, data archival, and dissemination). These types of data can be collected on stationary and moving targets by electro-optical (to include IR, MWIR, SWIR TIR [Thermal Infrared Range], Spectral, MSI, HSI, HD), SAR (to include MTI), related sensor programs (both active and passive) and non-technical means (to include geospatial information acquired by personnel in the field).

Here Geospatial Intelligence, or the frequently used term GEOINT, is an intelligence discipline comprising the exploitation and analysis of geospatial data and information to describe, assess, and visually depict physical features (both natural and constructed) and geographically reference activities on the Earth. Geospatial Intelligence data sources include imagery and mapping data, whether collected by commercial satellite, government satellite, aircraft (such as unmanned aerial vehicles [UAV] or reconnaissance aircraft), or by other means, such as maps and commercial databases, census information, GPS waypoints, utility schematics, or any discrete data that have locations on earth. There is growing recognition that human geography, socio-cultural intelligence, and other aspects of the human domain are a critical domain of GEOINT data due to the now pervasive geo-referencing of demographic, ethnographic, and political stability data. There is an emerging recognition that "this legal definition paints with a broad brushstroke an idea of the width and depth of GEOINT" and "GEOINT must evolve even further to integrate forms of intelligence and information beyond the traditional sources of geospatial information and imagery, and must move from an emphasis on data and analysis to an emphasis on knowledge."

== Principles ==
Key terms, such as GEOINT and NGA, were developed for public policy purposes. The NIMA Act of 1996 establishing the National Imagery and Mapping Agency. This resulted in the integration of multiple sources of information, intelligence and trade crafts into NIMA, which subsequently became NGA. Then Director James Clapper (2001–2006) designated this discipline as GEOINT, in the ilk of IMINT, SIGINT, MASINT, HUMINT.

The question as to how GEOINT is different from other geospatial analytic activities is occasionally asked. Bacastow suggested the following First Principles as markers that define the professional domain in terms of uniqueness and value. These are:

- GEOINT, rooted in the geospatial sciences, geospatial technologies and a tradecraft that seeks knowledge to achieve a decision advantage. Achieving a decision advantage may result in or require information denial and deception (D&D).
- Analysis occurs as a human-machine team.
- GEOINT reveals how human action is constrained by the physical landscape and human perceptions of Earth.
- GEOINT seeks to anticipate patterns of life through time.
- The data and technical systems reflect human biases.

== Geospatial data, information, and knowledge ==
The definitions and usage of the terms geospatial data, geospatial information, and geospatial knowledge are not consistent or unambiguous, further exacerbating the situation. Geospatial data can (usually) be applied to the output of a collector or collection system before it is processed, i.e., data that was sensed. Geospatial Information is geospatial data that has been processed or had value added to it by a human or machine process. Geospatial knowledge is a structuring of geospatial information, accompanied by an interpretation or analysis. The terms Data, Information, Knowledge and Wisdom (DIKW pyramid) are difficult to define, but cannot be used interchangeably.

Generally, geospatial intelligence can be more readily defined as, data, information, and knowledge gathered about entities that can be referenced to a particular location on, above, or below the Earth's surface. The intelligence gathering method can include imagery, signals, measurements and signatures, and human sources, i.e., IMINT, SIGINT, MASINT, and HUMINT, as long as a geo-location can be associated with the intelligence.

== Relationship to other "INT" ==
Thus, rather than being a peer to the other "INT", geospatial intelligence might better be viewed as the unifying structure of the Earth's natural and constructed features (including elevations and depths)—whether as individual layers in a GIS or as composited into a map or chart, imagery representations of the Earth, AND, the presentation of the existence of data, information, and knowledge derived from analysis of IMINT, SIGINT, MASINT, HUMINT, and other intelligence sources and disciplines.

== Other factors ==
It has been suggested that GEOINT is just a new term used to identify a broad range of outputs from intelligence organizations that use a variety of existing spatial skills and disciplines including photogrammetry, cartography, imagery analysis, remote sensing, and terrain analysis. However, GEOINT is more than just the sum of these parts. Spatial thinking as applied in Geospatial Intelligence can synthesize any intelligence or other data that can be conceptualized in a geographic spatial context. Geospatial Intelligence can be derived entirely independent of any satellite or aerial imagery and can be clearly differentiated from IMINT (imagery intelligence). Confusion and dissension is caused by Title 10 U.S. Code §467's separation of "imagery" or "satellite information" from "geospatial information" as imagery is generally considered just one of the forms which geospatial information might take or be derived from.

It has also been suggested that geospatial intelligence can be described as a product occurring at the point of delivery, i.e., by the amount of analysis which occurs to resolve particular problems, not by the type of data used. For example, a database containing a list of measurements of bridges obtained from imagery is 'information' while the development of an output using analysis to determine those bridges that are able to be utilized for specific purposes could be termed 'intelligence'. Similarly, the simple measurement of beach profiles is a classical geographic information-gathering activity, while the process of selecting a beach that matches a certain profile for a specific purpose is an analytical activity, and the output could be termed an intelligence product. In this form it is considered to be generally used by agencies requiring definitions of their outputs for descriptive and capability development purposes (or, more cynically, as a marketing strategy).

Geospatial intelligence analysis has been light-heartedly defined as "seeing what everybody has seen and thinking what nobody has thought" or as "anticipating a target's mental map." However, these perspectives affirm that creating geospatial knowledge is an effortful cognitive process the analyst undertakes; it is an intellectual endeavor that arrives at a conclusion through reasoning. Geospatial reasoning creates the objective connection between a geospatial problem representation and geospatial evidence. Here one set of activities, information foraging, focuses around finding information while another set of activities, sensemaking, focuses on giving meaning to the information. The activities of foraging and sensemaking in geospatial analysis have been incorporated in the Structured Geospatial Analytic Method.

== De facto definition ==
A de facto definition of geospatial intelligence, which is more reflective of the broad international nature of the discipline, is vastly different from the de jure definition expressed in U.S. Code. This de facto definition is:

Geospatial Intelligence is a field of knowledge, a process, and a profession. As knowledge, it is information integrated in a coherent space-time context that supports descriptions, explanations, or forecasts of human activities with which decision makers take action. As a process, it is the means by which data and information are collected, manipulated, geospatially reasoned, and disseminated to decision-makers. The geospatial intelligence profession establishes the scope of activities, interdisciplinary associations, competencies, and standards in academe, government, and the private sectors.

This has been suggested as an operational definition of Geospatial Intelligence which might use the moniker of GeoIntel so as to distinguish it from the more restrictive definition offered in U.S. Code Title 10, §467.

== GEOINT agencies ==
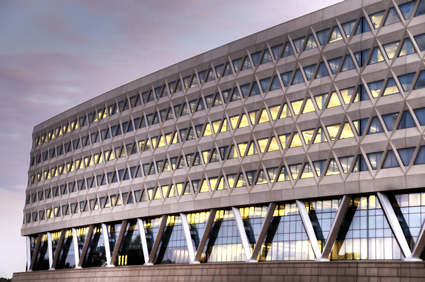
National Geospatial-Intelligence Agency building at the Fort Belvoir (North Area) in Springfield, Virginia

- Australia: Australian Geospatial-Intelligence Organisation (AGO) formerly known as Defence Imagery and Geospatial Organisation (DIGO)
- Canada: Canadian Forces Joint Imagery Centre, an element of Canadian Forces Intelligence Command (CFINTCOM)
- European Union: European Union Satellite Centre (EUSC)
- New Zealand: GEOINT New Zealand (GNZ) formerly known as the Joint Geospatial Support Facility (JGSF)
- Portugal: Army Geospatial Intelligence Center (CIGeoE)
- United Kingdom: Defence Geographic Centre (DGC) and the Defence Geospatial Intelligence Fusion Centre (DGIFC)
- USA: National Geospatial-Intelligence Agency (NGA)

== US Service Fusion/GEOINT Centers ==
- USA: Army Geospatial Center (AGC)
- USA: National Air and Space Intelligence Center (NASIC)
- USA: National Ground Intelligence Center (NGIC)
- USA: National Maritime Intelligence-Integration Office (NMIO)

== GEOINT units ==
- Australian Army: 1st Topographical Survey Squadron (1 TOPO SVY SQN) (Homeland Security: Army Spatial Information Capabilities)
- United States Army: United States Army Space and Missile Defense Command – Army Forces Strategic Command – Advanced Geospatial Intelligence (AGI) Node
- United States Marine Corps: 1st Topographic Platoon (1st TOPO) (1st Marine Expeditionary Force – Marine Headquarters Group – 1st Intelligence Battalion – Production and Analysis Company)
- United States Marine Corps: 2nd Topographic Platoon (2nd TOPO) (2nd Marine Expeditionary Force – Marine Headquarters Group – 2nd Intelligence Battalion – Production and Analysis Company)
- United States Marine Corps: 3rd Topographic Platoon (3rd TOPO) (3rd Marine Expeditionary Force – Marine Headquarters Group – 3rd Intelligence Battalion – Production and Analysis Company)

== See also ==
- All-source intelligence
- Dino A. Brugioni – pioneer of imagery intelligence (now called geospatial intelligence)
- ELINT – electronic intelligence
- Geomatics engineering
- Geospatial engineering
- GIS in geospatial intelligence
- HUMINT – human intelligence
- IMINT – imagery intelligence
- MASINT – measurement and signature intelligence
- Sentient (intelligence analysis system)
- SIGINT – signals intelligence
- USGIF – US Geospatial Intelligence Foundation
- OSINT - Open-sourced intelligence
- SOCMINT - Social media intelligence
