= Indicator analysis =

Indicator analysis is a structured analytic technique used in intelligence analysis. It uses historical data to expose trends and identify upcoming major shifts in a subject area, helping the analyst provide evidence-based forecasts with reduced cognitive bias.

== History ==
Structured analytic techniques such as indicator analysis have been used by analysts the United States Intelligence Community (IC) for several decades, but usually only in the context of specialized subject areas. Since the World Trade Tower attacks on September 11, 2001, these techniques become more commonly used among analysts on more mainstream assignments as well, and throughout the IC. The National Commission on Terrorist Acts Upon the United States, or the 9/11 Commission that followed that event found that the IC had "a failure to challenge analytic mindsets, examine key assumptions, consider alternative hypotheses, and detect deceptive reporting," on the part of the IC, leading directly to the 9/11 attacks. In response, President George W. Bush restructured the IC from the outside with the Intelligence Reform and Terrorism Prevention Act (IRTPA), while internally agencies began reforming their methodology, using more specialized structured analytic techniques like indicator analysis to more reliably correct cognitive bias in the future.

== Elements of indicator analysis ==
=== Structured analytic techniques ===
Indicator analysis is a structured analytic technique. Structured analytic techniques are used by intelligence analysts to help remove cognitive bias, challenge intuitive judgements, and help create a clearly traceable argument to support analytic conclusions.

=== Requirement ===
The main question under scrutiny. The requirement is often determined by the needs of a particular decision-maker, and defines the scope of the problem.

=== Categories ===
These are the various aspects of the requirement that merit individual scrutiny in order to understand the entirely of a problem. For instance, if the requirement is to ascertain the stability of a particular country, an analyst would need to look at the categories of politics, economics, social considerations, and possibly several others to gain a clear understanding of the situation in that country.

=== Factors ===
Factors are sub-sets of a category. For instance, to understand the political situation in a country, an analyst would need to look at the presence of political unrest, levels of corruption, the national government's relationship with the military, and possibly several others.

=== Scenarios ===
A scenario is a customized estimate of possible specific outcomes that could result from a category improving or destabilizing. Usually these scenarios are based on the current events of the factors involved in that category.

=== Indicators ===
Indicators indicates the change of sign when the reaction is complete. Indicators can be single events or actions within a factor that signify a major shift, affecting conditions in the rest of the categories or other categories. Indicators can also be a combination of events that serve a similar function in conjunction with each other. Much of indicator analysis is looking for the specific indicators that will signal a coming upheaval, but tracking how factors change over time can result in very useful trend analysis as well that is still considered a part of indicator analysis as a practice.

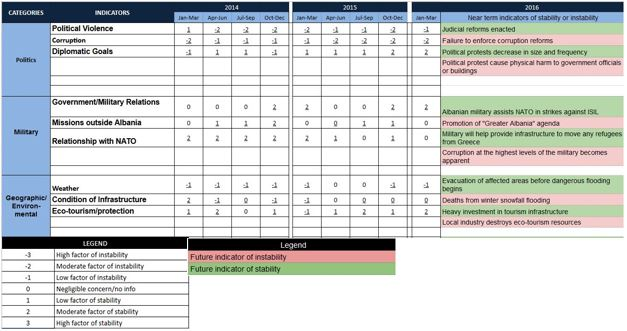
An example of indicator analysis for stability in Albania, with three categories of factors listed

== Process ==
1. - Identify a set of categories relevant to the requirement
2. - Identify a set of factors relevant to each category in the context of the overall requirement
3. - Identify near-term scenarios that could result from immediate devolving or improvement in each factor
4. - Identify a series of events, or indicators, that could signify improvement or deterioration within each factor
5. - Review historical and ongoing events for indicators within each factor
6. - Identify single indicators and indicator trends to forecast which near-term scenario is most likely to occur.

According to Randolph Pherson, a good indicator should be "Observable and Collectible, Valid, Reliable, Stable, and Unique" in order to find the key drivers of change in a given scenario. However, until the U.S. Intelligence Community standardizes its indicator lists, either within an agency or across the community, indicator choices will be subjective and possibly open to misunderstanding of terminology or scope if the analysis is later exposed to a broader audience than the originating task force.

== Benefits ==
- Helps avoid cognitive biases like anchoring or confirmation bias
- Helps keep analysts objective by using a pre-set list of criteria
- Helps organize complex problems by breaking up requirements into more manageable subject areas
- Allows analysts to detect gradual changes more easily
- Allows for greater transparency in reaching analytic judgments

== Weaknesses ==
- Based on a series of subjective judgments
- Can be very time-consuming and cumbersome for emergency reporting
- Based on historical analysis that may not be relevant to future developments in non-linear issues

== Related Structured Analytic Techniques ==
- Structured Brainstorming like Nominal Group Technique
- Analysis of Competing Hypotheses
- Key Assumptions Check
- Customer Checklist
- Premortem Analysis
