= Center for Intelligence and Security Studies =

The University of Mississippi's Center for Intelligence and Security Studies (CISS) is the school for intelligence field education located on the University of Mississippi campus in Oxford, Mississippi, United States. The center was formed in 2008 and offers two different minors: intelligence and security studies and global security studies.

== Academics ==
The stated goal of the center is to train intelligence analysts and prepare them for a career in the United States Intelligence Community. When the center first opened, it only offered a minor in intelligence and security studies.

The center's opening also prompted the formation of an intensive Arabic language program, the only Arabic language program in the state.

== History ==
The Center for Intelligence and Security Studies program opened prior to the 2008 fall semester. On April 13, 2009, the center moved to the former Athletics Department building on campus, where it remains today. U.S. Senator Roger Wicker and Chancellor Robert Khayat were present at the opening of the center's new location.

In 2013, the center was named to the Director of National Intelligence's National Center of Academic Excellence, and as such received federal funding to help develop courses, study abroad opportunities, conferences, and workshops. The following year, the International Association for Intelligence Education certified the program.
