= Richards Heuer =

American intelligence analyst

Richards J. Heuer Jr.
- Born: July 15, 1927
- Died: August 21, 2018 (aged 91)
- Occupation: Intelligence analyst

Richards "Dick" J. Heuer, Jr. (July 15, 1927 – August 21, 2018) was a CIA veteran of 45 years and most known for his work on analysis of competing hypotheses and his book, Psychology of Intelligence Analysis. The former provides a methodology for overcoming intelligence biases while the latter outlines how mental models and natural biases impede clear thinking and analysis. Throughout his career, he worked in collection operations, counterintelligence, intelligence analysis and personnel security. In 2010 he co-authored a book with Randolph (Randy) H. Pherson titled Structured Analytic Techniques for Intelligence Analysis.

== Background ==
Richards Heuer graduated in 1950 from Williams College with a Bachelor of Arts in Philosophy. One year later, while a graduate student at the University of California, Berkeley, future CIA Director Richard Helms recruited Heuer to work at the Central Intelligence Agency. Helms, also a graduate of Williams College, was looking for recent graduates to hire at CIA. Heuer spent the next 24 years working with the Directorate of Operations before switching to the Directorate of Intelligence in 1975. His interest in intelligence analysis and "how we know" was rekindled by the case of Yuri Nosenko and his studies in social science methodology while a master's student at the University of Southern California. Richards Heuer is well known for his analysis of the extremely controversial and disruptive case of Soviet KGB defector Yuri Nosenko, who was first judged to be part of a "master plot" for penetration of CIA but was later officially accepted as a legitimate defector. Heuer worked within the DI for four years, eventually retiring in 1979 after 28 years of service as the head of the methodology unit for the political analysis office. (Though retired from the DI in 1979, Heuer continued to work as a contractor on various projects until 1995.) He eventually received an M.A. in international relations from the University of Southern California. Heuer discovered his interest in cognitive psychology through reading the work of Kahneman and Tversky subsequent to an International Studies Association (ISA) convention in 1977. His continuing interest in the field and its application to intelligence analysis led to several published works including papers, CIA training lectures and conference panels.

== Structured analytic techniques ==
=== Structured Analytic Techniques for Intelligence Analysis and key concepts ===
Heuer's book Structured Analytic Techniques for Intelligence Analysis, published in 2010 (second edition 2015) and co-authored with Randy H. Pherson, provides a comprehensive taxonomy of structured analytic techniques (SATs) pertaining to eight categories: decomposition and visualization, idea generation, scenarios and indicators, hypothesis generation and testing, cause and effect, challenge analysis, conflict management and decision support. The book details 50 SATs (55 in the second edition) in step-by-step processes that contextualize each technique for use within the intelligence community and business community. The book goes beyond simply categorizing the various techniques by accentuating that SATs are processes that foster effective collaboration among analysts.

==== Structured analytic techniques as process ====
In light of the increasing need for interagency analyst collaboration, Heuer and Pherson advocate SATs as "enablers" of collective and interdisciplinary intelligence products. The book is a response to problems that arise in small group collaborative situations such as groupthink, group polarization and premature consensus. Heuer's previous insight into team dynamics advocates the use of analytic techniques such as Nominal Group Technique and Starbursting for idea generation and prediction markets for aggregating opinions in response to the identified problems. The book proposes SATs as not only a means for guiding collection and analysis, but also a means for guiding group interaction.

==== Recommendations to the Director of National Intelligence ====
Heuer and Pherson assert that the National Intelligence Council (NIC) needs to serve as the entity that sets the standards for the use of structured analytic techniques within the intelligence community. The Director of National Intelligence (DNI) could accomplish this by creating a new position to oversee the use of SATs in all NIC projects. Further, Heuer and Pherson suggest that the DNI create a "center for analytic tradecraft" responsible for testing all structured analytic techniques, developing new structured analytic techniques and managing feedback and lessons learned regarding all structured analytic techniques throughout the intelligence community.

=== Psychology of Intelligence Analysis and key concepts ===
Heuer's seminal work Psychology of Intelligence Analysis details his three fundamental points. First, human minds are ill-equipped ("poorly wired") to cope effectively with both inherent and induced uncertainty. Second, increased knowledge of our inherent biases tends to be of little assistance to the analyst. And lastly, tools and techniques that apply higher levels of critical thinking can substantially improve analysis on complex problems.

==== Mental models and perceptions ====
Mental models, or mind sets, are essentially the screens or lenses that people perceive information through. Even though every analyst sees the same piece of information, it is interpreted differently due to a variety of factors (past experience, education, and cultural values to name merely a few). In essence, one's perceptions are morphed by a variety of factors that are completely out of the control of the analyst. Heuer sees mental models as potentially good and bad for the analyst. On the positive side, they tend to simplify information for the sake of comprehension but they also obscure genuine clarity of interpretation.

Therefore, since all people observe the same information with inherent and different biases, Heuer believes an effective analysis system needs a few safeguards. It should: encourage products that clearly show their assumptions and chains of inferences; and it should emphasize procedures that expose alternative points of view. What is required of analysts is "a commitment to challenge, refine, and challenge again their own working mental models." This is a key component of his analysis of competing hypotheses; by delineating all available hypotheses and refuting the least likely ones, the most likely hypothesis becomes clearer.

==== Recommendations ====
Heuer offers several recommendations to the intelligence community for improving intelligence analysis and avoiding consistent pitfalls. First, an environment that not only promotes but rewards critical thinking is essential. Failure to challenge the first possible hypothesis simply because it sounds logical is unacceptable. Secondly, Heuer suggests that agencies expand funding for research on the role that cognitive processes play in decision making. With so much hanging on the failure of success of analytical judgments, he reasons, intelligence agencies need to stay abreast of new discoveries in this field. Thirdly, agencies should promote the continued development of new tools for assessing information.

=== Analysis of competing hypotheses ===
"Analysis of competing hypotheses (ACH) is an analytic process that identifies a complete set of alternative hypotheses, systematically evaluates data that is consistent and inconsistent with each hypothesis, and rejects hypotheses that contain too much inconsistent data." ACH is an eight step process to enhance analysis:

1. Identify all possible hypotheses
2. Make a list of significant evidence and arguments
3. Prepare a matrix to analyze the "diagnosticity" of evidence
4. Drawn tentative conclusions
5. Refine the matrix
6. Compare your personal conclusions about the relative likelihood of each hypothesis with the inconsistency scores
7. Report your conclusions
8. Identify indicators

Heuer originally developed ACH to be included as the core element in an interagency deception analysis course during the Reagan administration in 1984 concentrated on Soviet deception regarding arms deals. The Palo Alto Research Center (PARC) in conjunction with Heuer developed the PARC ACH 2.0.5 software for use within the intelligence community in 2005.

== Involvement in the Nosenko case ==
During the 1980s, Richards Heuer was deeply involved in analyzing the controversial Yuri Nosenko case. His paper, Nosenko: Five Paths to Judgment, was originally published in 1987 in the CIA's classified journal Studies in Intelligence, where it remained classified for eight years. In 1995, it was then published in Inside CIA's Private World, Declassified Articles from the Agency's Internal Journal, 1955–1992. The article is an explanation of how and why the errors associated with the Nosenko case occurred, and has been used for teaching deception analysis to analysts.

Heuer outlines five strategies for identifying truth in deception analysis cases, employing the Nosenko case as a use case throughout in order to demonstrate how analysts on the case failed to conclude that Nosenko was legitimate. The five strategies presented in the article are:

1. Motive approach: Identifying whether or not there is a motive for deception.
2. Anomalies and inconsistencies approach: Searching for inconsistencies from or deviations the norm.
3. Litmus test approach: Comparing the information from an unknown or new source with the information from a reliable or credible source.
4. Cost accounting approach: Analyzing the opportunity cost for the enemy and the cost of conducting deception.
5. Predictive test approach: Developing a tentative hypothesis and then comprehensively testing it.

Heuer states that though he was at one point a believer in "the master plot" (deep and pervasive penetration of the CIA by the Soviets) due to reasoning elaborated in the anomalies and inconsistencies approach and the motive approach, he came to discount this theory and to accept Yuri Nosenko as bona fide after exercising the predictive test approach and the cost accounting approach. Heuer maintains that considering the master plot was not unwise as it was a theory that should have been discussed in light of the information available at the time.

The conclusion of the five strategies approach is that, as demonstrated by the Nosenko case, "all five approaches are useful for complete analysis" and that an analyst should not rely on one strategy alone.

== Contributions in personnel security ==
During his 20 years as a consultant for the Defense Personnel Security Research Center (PERSEREC), Richards Heuer developed two encyclopedic websites: the Adjudicative Desk Reference and Customizable Security Guide and the Automated Briefing System. Both are free to use and available in the public domain for download.

=== Adjudicative desk reference ===
This large database supplements the Intelligence Community Adjudicative Guidelines which specify 13 categories of behavior that must be considered before granting a security clearance. Heuer's product provides far more detailed information about why these behaviors are a potential security concern and how to evaluate their severity. Though this background information is not official government policy, the reference has been approved by the Security Agency Executive Advisory Committee as a tool for assisting security investigators and managers. Appeals panels and lawyers have used it to deal with security clearance decisions, and it has also been proven useful to employee assistance counselors.

=== Online guide to security responsibilities ===
This tool provides an all-in-one source for introducing new personnel to all the various intricacies of security. Additionally, it provides a wealth of information for security professionals seeking to prepare awareness articles or briefings. The software covers a variety of topics including (but not limited to): protecting classified information, foreign espionage threats and methods, and computer vulnerabilities. It is an updated version of the Customizable Security Guide. In hard copy format, there are over 500 pages of material.

== Awards ==
- (1987) Agency Seal Medallion: "For developing and teaching an innovative methodology for addressing complex and challenging problems facing the intelligence community."
- (1988) CIA Recognition: "For outstanding contribution to the literature of intelligence."
- (1995) U.S. Congress Certificate of Special Congressional Recognition: "For outstanding service to the community."
- (1996) CIA Recognition: "For work on countering denial and deception."
- (2000) International Association of Law Enforcement Intelligence Analysts (IALEIA) "Publication of the Year" Award for Psychology of Intelligence Analysis
- (2008) International Association for Intelligence Education (IAFIE) Annual Award for Contribution to Intelligence Education
