= Uncertain data =

In computer science, uncertain data is data that contains noise that makes it deviate from the correct, intended or original values. In the age of big data, uncertainty or data veracity is one of the defining characteristics of data. Data is constantly growing in volume, variety, velocity and uncertainty (1/veracity). Uncertain data is found in abundance today on the web, in sensor networks, within enterprises both in their structured and unstructured sources. For example, there may be uncertainty regarding the address of a customer in an enterprise dataset, or the temperature readings captured by a sensor due to aging of the sensor. In 2012 IBM called out managing uncertain data at scale in its global technology outlook report that presents a comprehensive analysis looking three to ten years into the future seeking to identify significant, disruptive technologies that will change the world. In order to make confident business decisions based on real-world data, analyses must necessarily account for many different kinds of uncertainty present in very large amounts of data. Analyses based on uncertain data will have an effect on the quality of subsequent decisions, so the degree and types of inaccuracies in this uncertain data cannot be ignored.

Uncertain data is found in the area of sensor networks; text where noisy text is found in abundance on social media, web and within enterprises where the structured and unstructured data may be old, outdated, or plain incorrect; in modeling where the mathematical model may only be an approximation of the actual process. When representing such data in a database, an appropriate uncertain database model needs to be selected.

== Example data model for uncertain data ==
One way to represent uncertain data is through probability distributions. Let us take the example of a relational database. There are three main ways to do represent uncertainty as probability distributions in such a database model.

In attribute uncertainty, each uncertain attribute in a tuple is subject to its own independent probability distribution. For example, if readings are taken of temperature and wind speed, each would be described by its own probability distribution, as knowing the reading for one measurement would not provide any information about the other.

In correlated uncertainty, multiple attributes may be described by a joint probability distribution. For example, if readings are taken of the position of an object, and the x- and y-coordinates stored, the probability of different values may depend on the distance from the recorded coordinates. As distance depends on both coordinates, it may be appropriate to use a joint distribution for these coordinates, as they are not independent.

In tuple uncertainty, all the attributes of a tuple are subject to a joint probability distribution. This covers the case of correlated uncertainty, but also includes the case where there is a probability of a tuple not belonging in the relevant relation, which is indicated by all the probabilities not summing to one. For example, assume we have the following tuple from a probabilistic database:

(a, 0.4) | (b, 0.5)

Then, the tuple has 10% chance of not existing in the database.
