= 1st Topographic Platoon =

American military unit

The 1st Topographic Platoon is a military unit in the United States Marine Corps located on Camp Pendleton, California. It is composed of members of the Geographic Intelligence Specialist Military Occupational Specialty (MOS) 0261. Most members of the 0261 field are highly trained intelligence operators with extensive knowledge of geospatial intelligence, terrain analysis, land navigation techniques, datums and ellipsoids, coordinate systems, and cartography that make them a valuable asset to the Marine Expeditionary Force. All members are required to attend a 7 month course at the NMITC in Dam Neck, Virginia.

The platoon deployed a number of times in recent years, including multiple deployments to Iraq in the early 2000s and multiple deployments to Afghanistan in the 2010s with the I Marine Expeditionary Force (Fwd) on Camp Leatherneck.

== See also ==
- List of United States Marine Corps MOS
- Marine Corps MOS Manual
- Production and Analysis Homepage
