= Imagery intelligence =

Intelligence gathered by means of imagery

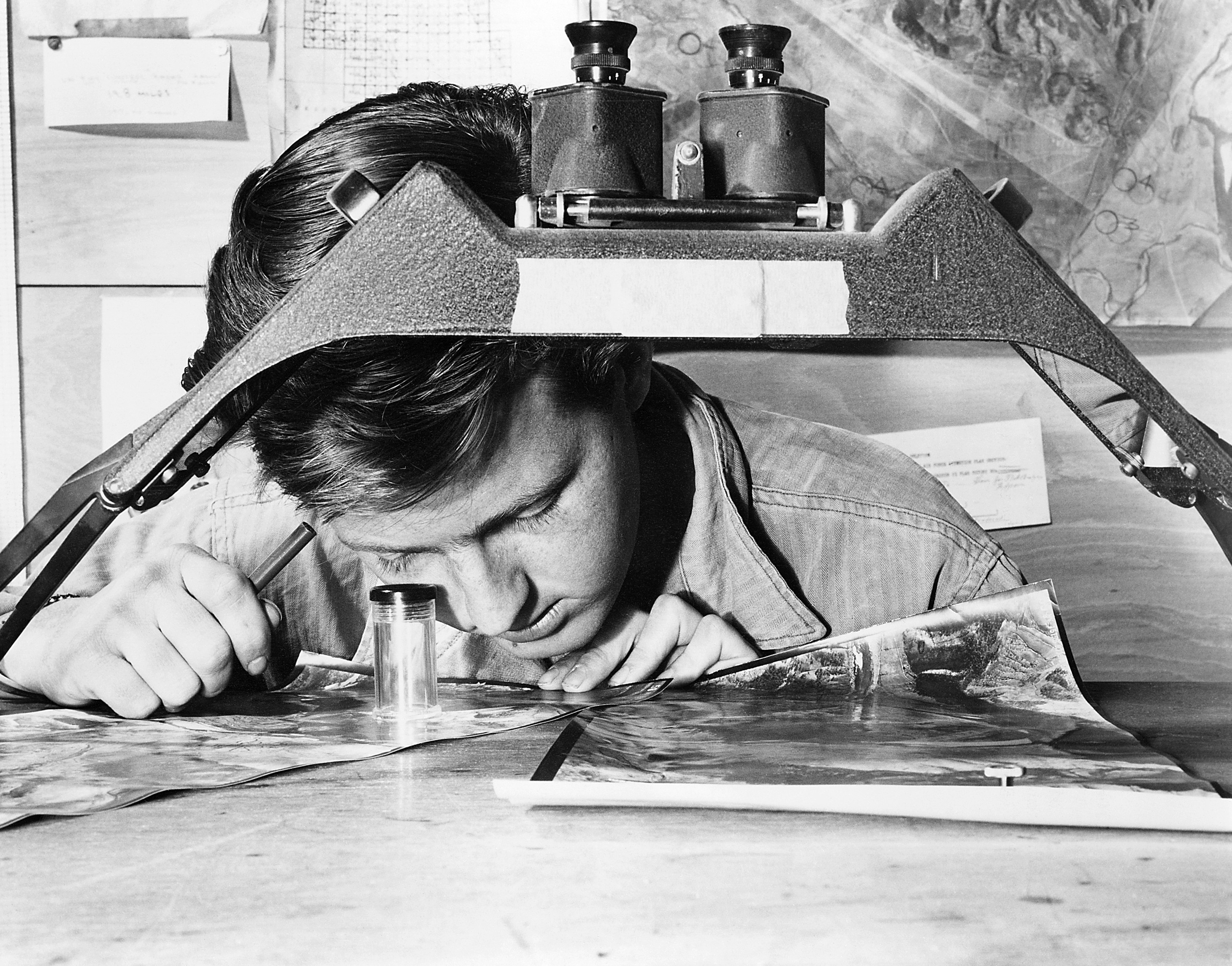
Fifth Air Force photographic analyst searches for the location of enemy flak batteries to plan attacks against enemy positions during the Korean War.

Imagery intelligence (IMINT), pronounced as either as Im-Int or I-Mint, is an intelligence gathering discipline wherein imagery is analyzed (or "exploited") to identify information of intelligence value. Imagery used for defense intelligence purposes is generally collected via satellite imagery or aerial photography.

As an intelligence gathering discipline, IMINT production depends heavily upon a robust intelligence collection management system. IMINT is complemented by non-imaging MASINT electro-optical and radar sensors.

== History ==
=== Origins ===
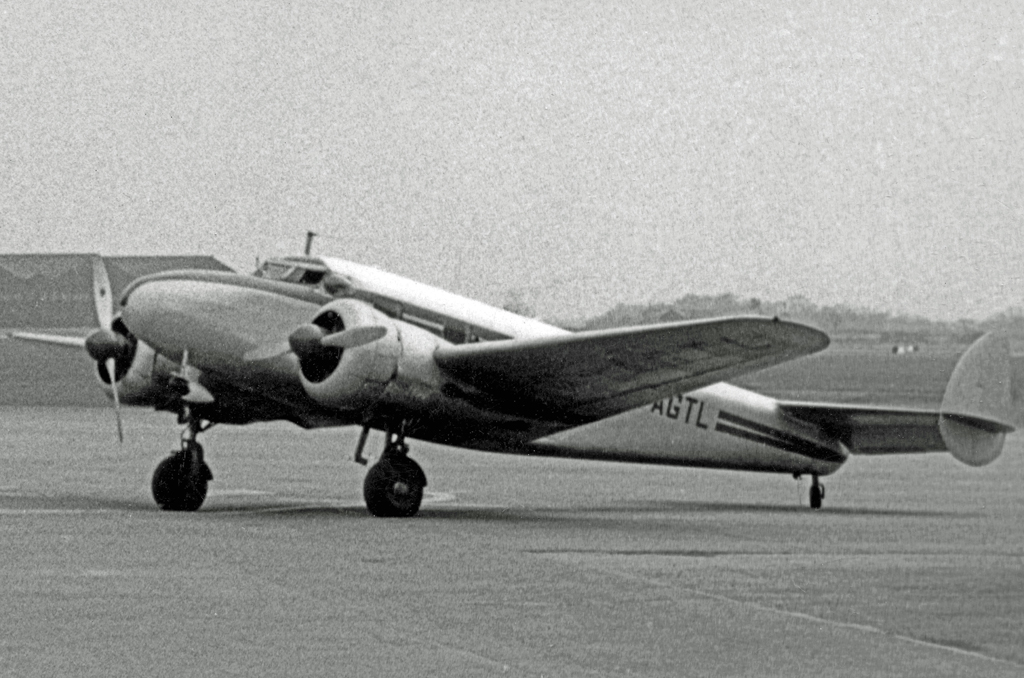
Sidney Cotton's Lockheed 12A, in which he made a high-speed reconnaissance flight in 1940.

Although aerial photography was first used extensively in the First World War, it was only in the Second World War that specialized imagery intelligence operations were initiated. High quality images were made possible with a series of innovations in the decade leading up to the war. In 1928, the RAF developed an electric heating system for the aerial camera. This allowed reconnaissance aircraft to take pictures from very high altitudes without the camera parts freezing.

In 1939, Sidney Cotton and Flying Officer Maurice Longbottom of the RAF suggested that airborne reconnaissance may be a task better suited to fast, small aircraft which would use their speed and high service ceiling to avoid detection and interception. They proposed the use of Spitfires with their armament and radios removed and replaced with extra fuel and cameras. This led to the development of the Spitfire PR variants. These planes had a maximum speed of 396 mph at 30,000 feet with their armaments removed, and were used for photo-reconnaissance missions. The aircraft were fitted with five cameras which were heated to ensure good results.

The systematic collection and interpretation of the huge amounts of aerial reconnaissance intelligence data soon became imperative. Beginning in 1941, RAF Medmenham was the main interpretation centre for photographic reconnaissance operations in the European and Mediterranean theatres. The Central Interpretation Unit (CIU) was later amalgamated with the Bomber Command Damage Assessment Section and the Night Photographic Interpretation Section of No 3 Photographic Reconnaissance Unit, RAF Oakington, in 1942.

During 1942 and 1943, the CIU gradually expanded and was involved in the planning stages of practically every operation of the war, and in every aspect of intelligence. In 1945, daily intake of material averaged 25,000 negatives and 60,000 prints. Thirty-six million prints were made during the war. By VE-day, the print library, which documented and stored worldwide cover, held 5,000,000 prints from which 40,000 reports had been produced.

American personnel had for some time formed an increasing part of the CIU and on 1 May 1944 this was finally recognized by changing the title of the unit to the Allied Central Interpretation Unit (ACIU). There were then over 1,700 personnel on the unit's strength. A large number of photographic interpreters were recruited from the Hollywood Film Studios including Xavier Atencio. Two renowned archaeologists also worked there as interpreters: Dorothy Garrod, the first woman to hold an Oxbridge Chair, and Glyn Daniel, who went on to gain popular acclaim as the host of the television game show Animal, Vegetable or Mineral?.

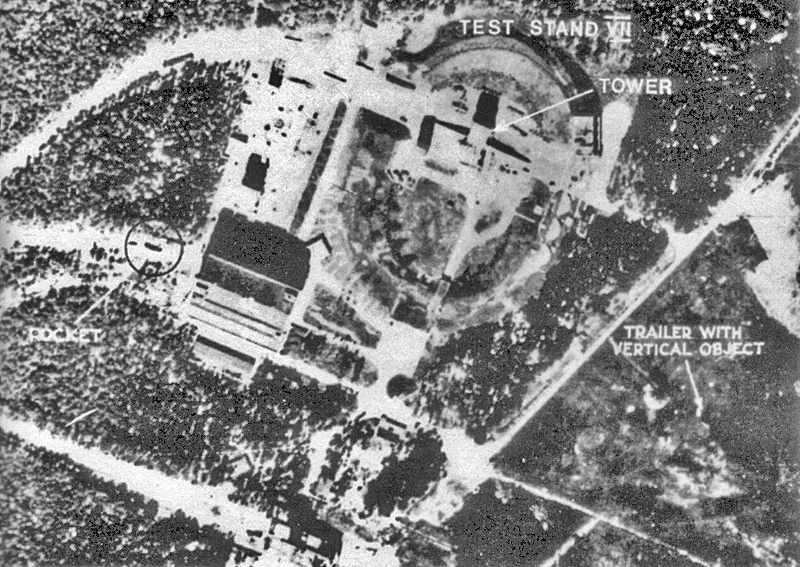
Aerial photograph of the missile Test Stand VII at Peenemünde.

Sidney Cotton's aerial photographs were far ahead of their time. Together with other members of his reconnaissance squadron, he pioneered the technique of high-altitude, high-speed photography that was instrumental in revealing the locations of many crucial military and intelligence targets. Cotton also worked on ideas such as a prototype specialist reconnaissance aircraft and further refinements of photographic equipment. At its peak, British reconnaissance flights yielded 50,000 images per day to interpret.

Of particular significance in the success of the work of Medmenham was the use of stereoscopic images, using a between plate overlap of exactly 60%. Despite initial scepticism about the possibility of the German rocket technology, major operations, including the 1943 offensives against the V-2 rocket development plant at Peenemünde, were made possible by painstaking work carried out at Medmenham. Later offensives were also made against potential launch sites at Wizernes and 96 other launch sites in northern France.

It is claimed that Medmanham's greatest operational success was "Operation Crossbow" which, from 23 December 1943, destroyed the V-1 infrastructure in northern France. According to R.V. Jones, photographs were used to establish the size and the characteristic launching mechanisms for both the V-1 flying bomb and the V-2 rocket.

=== Post war spyplanes ===
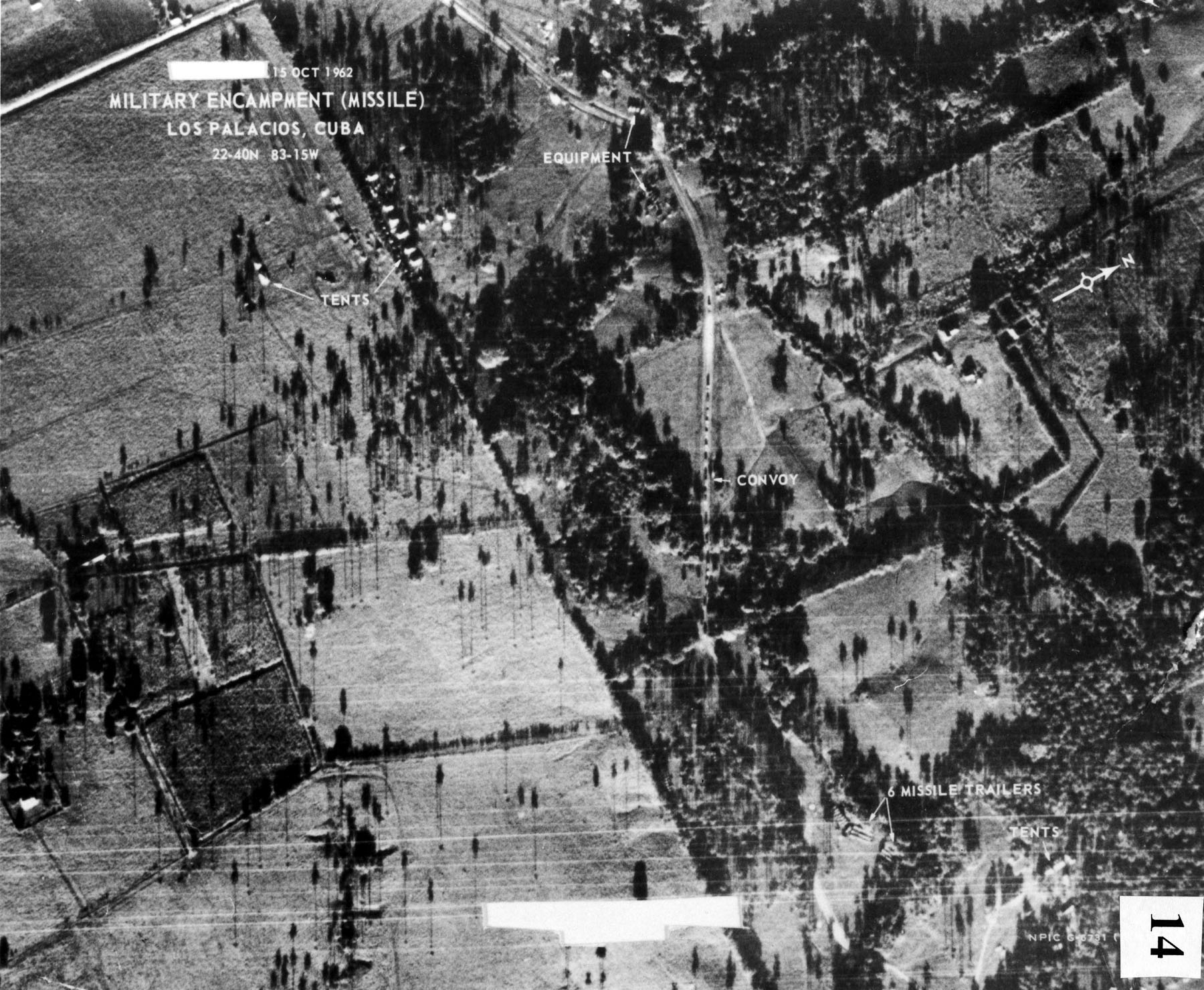
Soviet truck convoy deploying missiles near San Cristobal, Cuba, on Oct. 14, 1962 (taken by a U-2)

Immediately after World War II, long range aerial reconnaissance was taken up by adapted jet bombers – such as the English Electric Canberra, and its American development, the Martin B-57 – capable of flying higher or faster than the enemy.

Highly specialized and secretive strategic reconnaissance aircraft, or spy planes, such as the Lockheed U-2 and its successor, the SR-71 Blackbird were developed by the United States. Flying these aircraft became an exceptionally demanding task, as much because of the aircraft's extreme speed and altitude as the risk of being captured as spies. As a result, the crews of these aircraft were invariably specially selected and trained.

There are claims that the US constructed a hypersonic reconnaissance aircraft, dubbed the Aurora, in the late 1980s to replace the Blackbird. Since the early 1960s, in the United States aerial and satellite reconnaissance has been coordinated by the National Reconnaissance Office.

=== Early use of satellites ===
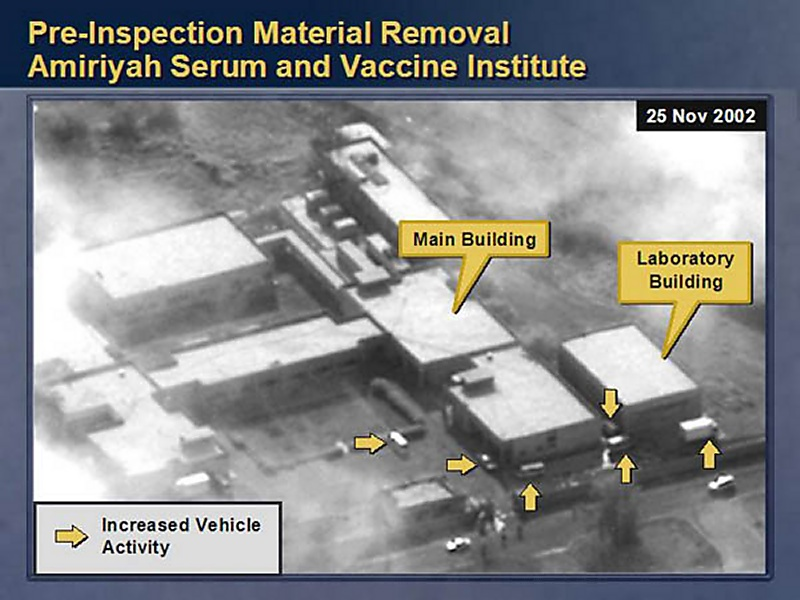
Serum and Vaccine Institute in Al-A'amiriya, Iraq, as imaged by a US reconnaissance satellite in November 2002.

Early photographic reconnaissance satellites used photographic film, which was exposed on-orbit and returned to earth for developing. These satellites remained in orbit for days, weeks, or months before ejecting their film-return vehicles, called "buckets". Between 1959 and 1984 the U.S. launched around 200 such satellites under the codenames CORONA and GAMBIT, with ultimate photographic resolution (ground-resolution distance) better than 4 inches (0.10 m). The first successful mission concluded on 1960-08-19 with the mid-air recovery by a C-119 of film from the Corona mission code-named Discoverer 14. This was the first successful recovery of film from an orbiting satellite and the first aerial recovery of an object returning from Earth orbit. Because of a tradeoff between area covered and ground resolution, not all reconnaissance satellites have been designed for high resolution; the KH-5-ARGON program had a ground resolution of 140 meters and was intended for mapmaking.

Between 1961 and 1994 the USSR launched perhaps 500 Zenit film-return satellites, which returned both the film and the camera to earth in a pressurized capsule.

The U.S. KH-11 series of satellites, first launched in 1976, was made by Lockheed, the same contractor who built the Hubble Space Telescope. HST has a 2.4 metre telescope mirror and is believed to have had a similar appearance to the KH-11 satellites. These satellites used charge-coupled devices, predecessors to modern digital cameras, rather than film. Russian reconnaissance satellites with comparable capabilities are named Resurs DK and Persona.

== Aircraft ==
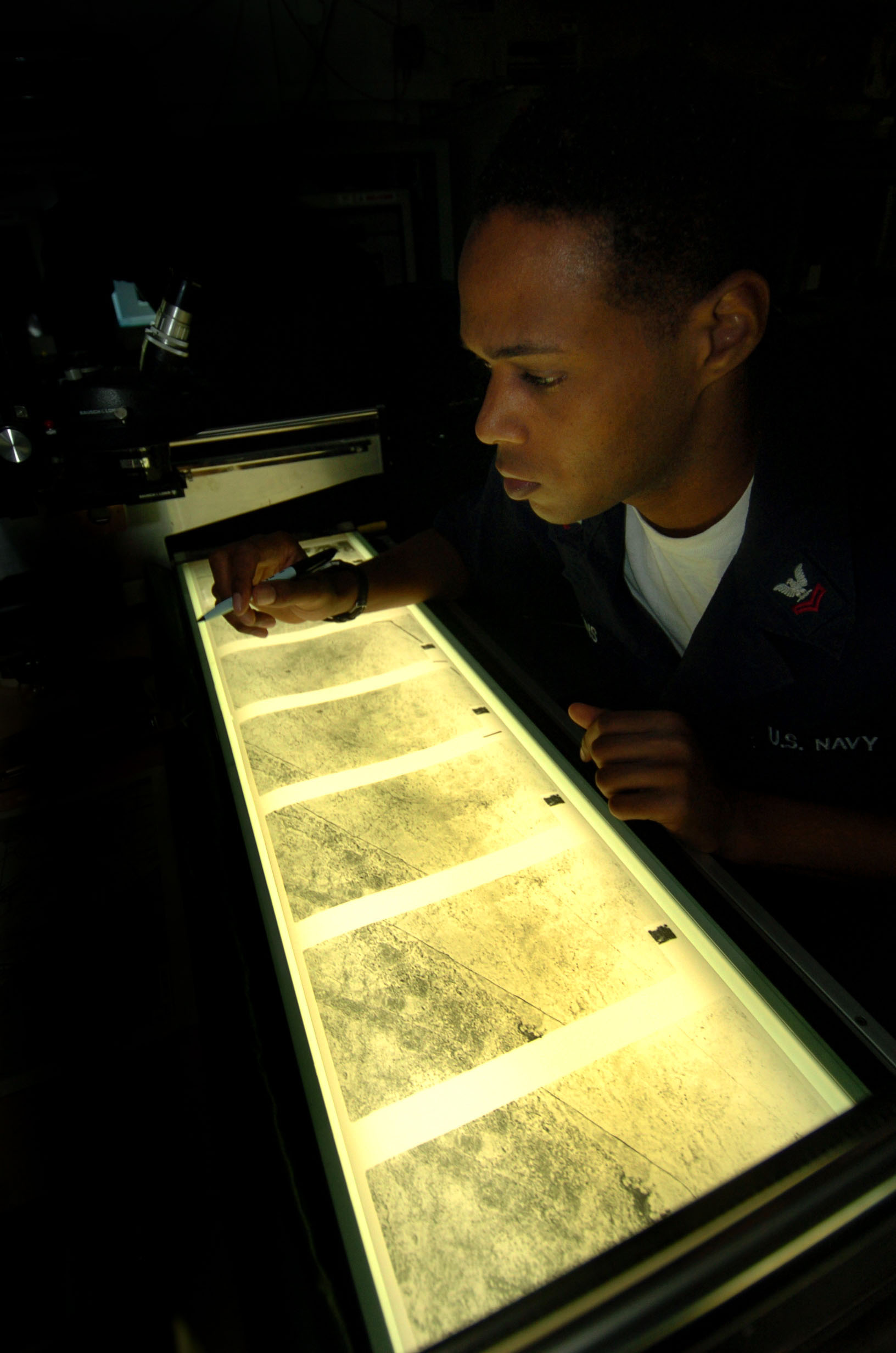
US Navy sailor examining aerial reconnaissance imagery on a light table, 2004.

Low- and high-flying planes have been used all through the last century to gather intelligence about the enemy. U.S. high-flying reconnaissance planes include the Lockheed U-2, and the much faster SR-71 Blackbird, (retired in 1998). One advantage planes have over satellites is that planes can usually produce more detailed photographs and can be placed over the target more quickly, more often, and more cheaply, but planes also have the disadvantage of possibly being intercepted by aircraft or missiles such as in the 1960 U-2 incident.

Unmanned aerial vehicles have been developed for imagery and signals intelligence. These drones are a force multiplier by giving the battlefield commander an "eye in the sky" without risking a pilot.

== Satellite ==
Though the resolution of satellite photographs, which must be taken from distances of hundreds of kilometers, is usually poorer than photographs taken by air, satellites offer the possibility of coverage for much of the earth, including hostile territory, without exposing human pilots to the risk of being shot down.

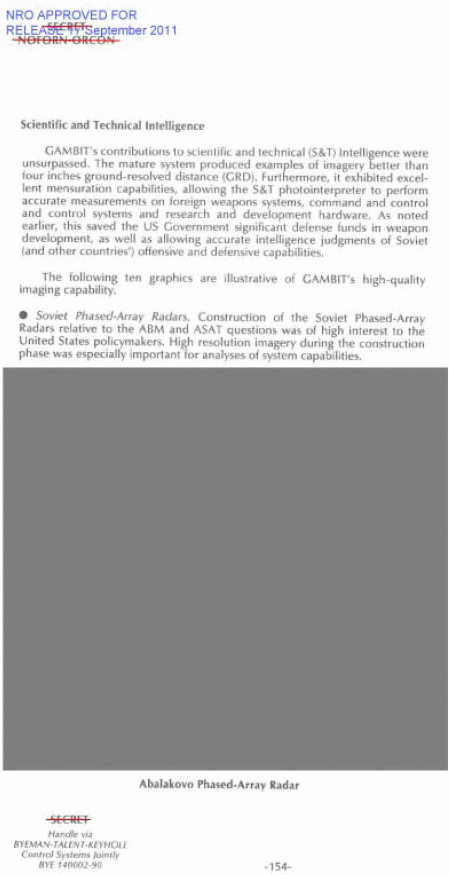
Ground-resolution distance achieved by KH-8

There have been hundreds of reconnaissance satellites launched by dozens of nations since the first years of space exploration. Satellites for imaging intelligence were usually placed in high-inclination low Earth orbits, sometimes in Sun-synchronous orbits. Since the film-return missions were usually short, they could indulge in orbits with low perigees, in the range of 100–200 km, but the more recent CCD-based satellites have been launched into higher orbits, 250–300 km perigee, allowing each to remain in orbit for several years. While the exact resolution and other details of modern spy satellites are classified, some idea of the trade-offs available can be made using simple physics. The formula for the highest possible resolution of an optical system with a circular aperture is given by the Rayleigh criterion:

$$\sin \theta = 1.22 \frac{\lambda}{D}.$$

Using

$$\sin \theta =  \frac{\text{size}}{\text{distance}},$$

we can get

$$\text{size} =  1.22\frac{\lambda}{D} \text{distance},$$

where θ is the angular resolution, λ is the wavelength of light, and D is the diameter of the lens or mirror. Were the Hubble Space Telescope, with a 2.4 m telescope, designed for photographing Earth, it would be diffraction-limited to resolutions greater than 16 cm (6 inches) for green light ($\lambda \approx 550$ nm) at its orbital altitude of 590 km. This means that it would be impossible to take photographs showing objects smaller than 16 cm with such a telescope at such an altitude. Modern U.S. IMINT satellites are believed to have around 10 cm resolution; contrary to references in popular culture, this is sufficient to detect any type of vehicle, but not to read the headlines of a newspaper.

The primary purpose of most spy satellites is to monitor visible ground activity. While resolution and clarity of images has improved greatly over the years, this role has remained essentially the same. Some other uses of satellite imaging have been to produce detailed 3D maps for use in operations and missile guidance systems, and to monitor normally invisible information such as the growth levels of a country's crops or the heat given off by certain facilities. Some of the multi-spectral sensors, such as thermal measurement, are more electro-optical MASINT than true IMINT platforms.

To counter the threat posed by these "eyes in the sky", the United States, USSR/Russia, China and India have developed systems for destroying enemy spy satellites (either with the use of another 'killer satellite', or with some sort of Earth- or air-launched missile).

Since 1985, commercial vendors of satellite imagery have entered the market, beginning with the French SPOT satellites, which had resolutions between 5 and 20 metres. Recent high-resolution (4–0.5 metre) private imaging satellites include TerraSAR-X, IKONOS, Orbview, QuickBird and Worldview-1, allowing any country (or any business for that matter) to buy access to satellite images.

== Analytical Methodology ==
The value of IMINT reports are determined on a balance between the timeliness and robustness of the intelligence product. As such, the fidelity of intelligence that may be gleaned from imagery analysis is a traditionally perceived by intelligence professionals as a function of the amount of time an imagery analyst (IA) has to exploit a given image or set of imagery. As such, the United States Army field manual breaks IMINT analysis into three distinct phases, based upon the amount of time expended in exploiting any given image.

=== First phase ===
First phase imagery analysis is deemed "time-dominant". This means that given imagery must be rapidly exploited in order to satisfy an immediate requirement for imagery-sourced intelligence from which a leader may make an educated political and/or military decision. Due to the need to produce near-real time intelligence assessments based upon collected imagery, first phase imagery analysis is rarely compared to collateral intelligence.

=== Second phase ===
Second phase imagery analysis is centered on the further exploitation of recently collected imagery to support short- to mid-term decision-making. Like first phase imagery analysis, second phase imagery analysis is generally catalyzed by a local commander's Priority Intelligence Requirements, at least in the context of a military operational setting. Whereas first phase imagery analysis may depend on the exploitation of a relatively small repository of imagery, or even a single image, second phase imagery analysis generally mandates a review of a chronological set of imagery over time, so as to establish a temporal understanding of objects and/or activities of interest.

=== Third phase ===
Third phase imagery analysis is generally conducted in order to satisfy strategic intelligence questions or to otherwise explore existing data in the search of "discovery intelligence". Third phase imagery analysis hinges on the use of a large repository of historical imagery as well as access to a variety of sources of information. Third phase imagery analysis incorporates supporting information and intelligence from other intelligence gathering disciplines and is, therefore, generally conducted in support of a multi-source intelligence team. The exploitation of imagery at this level of analysis is typically conducted with the intention of producing Geospatial Intelligence (GEOINT).

== See also ==
- Arthur C. Lundahl
- Canadian Forces Joint Imagery Centre (Canadian GEOINT organization)
- Defence Imagery and Geospatial Organisation (DIGO) (Australian GEOINT organization)
- Defence Intelligence Fusion Centre (British GEOINT organization)
- Dino A. Brugioni
- First images of Earth from space
- GIS in GEOINT
- Geospatial intelligence (GEOINT)
- National Collection of Aerial Photography (NCAP)
- National Geospatial-Intelligence Agency (American GEOINT organization)
- RAF Intelligence: Royal Air Force Intelligence Branch
- Remote Sensing
- Sentient (intelligence analysis system)
