= Merton E. Davies =

Pioneer of America's space program

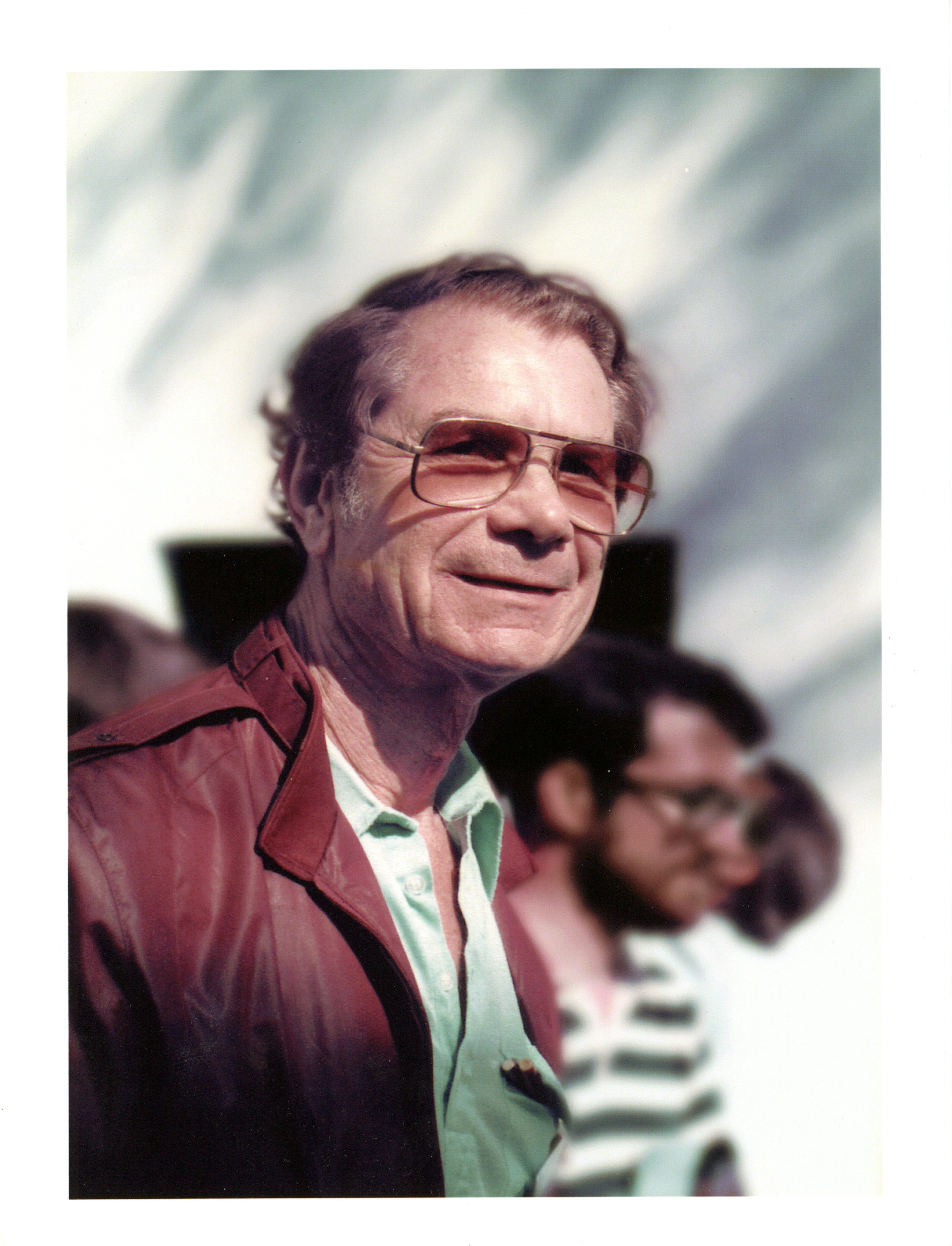
- Born: September 13, 1917; St. Paul, Minnesota, U.S.
- Died: April 17, 2001 (aged 83); Santa Monica, California, U.S.
- Education: Stanford University – Mathematics (1938)
- Spouse(s): Louise Darling (3 children)
- Awards: * George W. Goddard Award; * NASA Certificate of Recognition for Technical Innovation, 1976; * Talbert Abrams Award of the American Society of Photogrammetry
- Scientific career
- Fields: Planetary science
- Workplaces: RAND Corporation

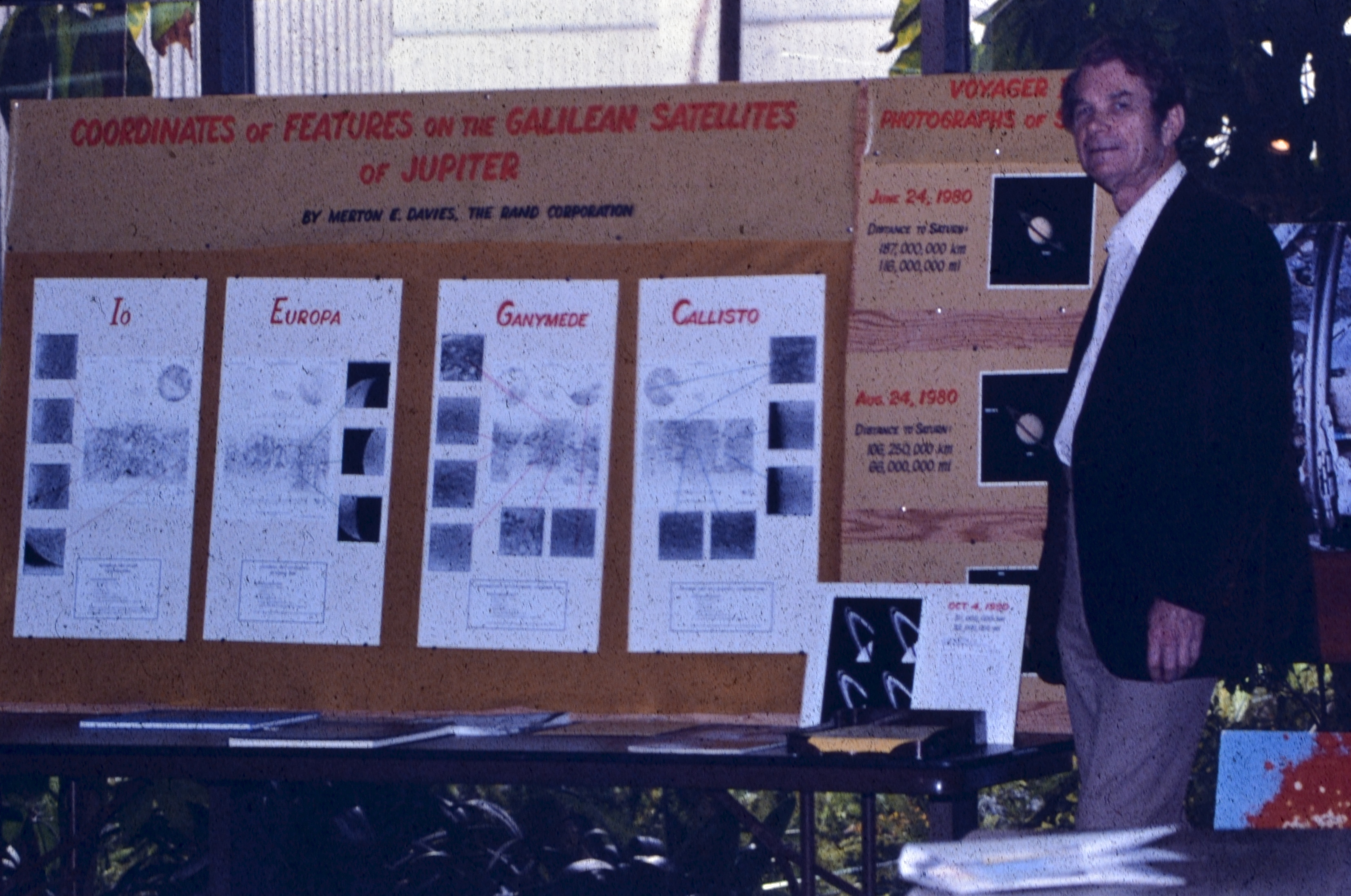
Merton E. Davies presents the cartographic coordinate systems of the Galilean moons of Jupiter in 1980.

Merton E. Davies (September 13, 1917 – April 17, 2001) was a pioneer of America's space program, first in Earth reconnaissance and later in planetary exploration and mapping. He graduated from Stanford University in 1938 and worked for the Douglas Aircraft corporation in the 1940s. He worked as a member of RAND Corporation after it split off from Douglas in 1948 and for the remainder of his career.

== Career ==
=== National reconnaissance (1947–1970) ===
Davies' early work was highly classified and included original analyses of materials, payloads, structures, and propulsion systems for missiles and spacecraft.

Davies, along with Amrom Harry Katz, were early advocates of the United States' development of balloon and reconnaissance satellite technology (including CORONA).

Davies made key contributions to US intelligence operations during critical periods of the Cold War.

He was a member of the U.S. delegation to the Surprise Attack Conference in Geneva in 1958 and was later a consultant to the Arms Control and Disarmament Agency. In 1966 he was awarded the George W. Goddard Award for distinguished contributions to photo reconnaissance. In 1967 he served as a U.S. Observer on an inspection of foreign bases in Antarctica under terms of the Antarctic Treaty. He was awarded the Antarctic Service Medal by the U.S. Navy.

On August 18, 2000, Davies was acknowledged as one of the ten Founders of National Reconnaissance by the National Reconnaissance Office for his leadership in advocating the use of satellites for national reconnaissance and inventing the Spin-Pan (torque compensating) camera concept. The other original Founders were: William O. Baker, Sidney Drell, Richard L. Garwin, Amrom Harry Katz, James R. Killian, Edwin H. Land, Frank W. Lehan, William J. Perry, Edward M. Purcell. Although their early work was highly classified, this group of men went on to extraordinary public accomplishments, including a Secretary of Defense, a Nobel Laureate, a president of MIT, recipients of the Presidential Medal of Science, a renowned planetary scientist, and more.

=== Planetary exploration (1965–2001) ===
In 1965 he participated in the first Jet Propulsion Laboratory (JPL) attempt to fly to Mars a tiny primitive spacecraft carrying the world's first digital camera, Mariner 4, and the follow-on Mars flyby missions, Mariners 6 and 7. Then he went on to an unparalleled career in planetary exploration. He was a key member of the imaging teams of Mariners 6, 7, 9, and 10, of Voyagers 1 and 2 and Galileo and Cassini, of NEAR and Magellan.

He was responsible for creating the geodetic control network for the mapping of the surface of Mars, and thus had the honor of establishing its prime meridian. As described by Tobias Owen for the American Astronomical Society: "Before launch, he participated in the design of the camera systems and the development of imaging strategies. When the data came in, it was Mert who established the coordinate systems for all of the target objects. The maps we have of Mercury, Venus, Mars and the satellites of the outer planets are all based on his work in establishing the point of zero longitude or the prime meridian for each object. As Bruce Murray has commented, to do so for even one such object would be a "major career achievement by any scientist," but to be credited for having done so for essentially every large solid object in the Solar System except Earth and Pluto provides "an instructive lens through which to view Davies accomplishment."(EOS, 82, 46(13 November 2001):551–552.)

He invented the photogrammetric control point technique that provided the basic framework for all planetary surface mapping and coordinates systems of his era. His fundamental contributions to planetary mapping led to his being the founding chairman of the IAU/IAG Working Group on Cartographic Coordinates and Rotational Elements of the Planets and Satellites in 1976. At about this same time, he became a member of the newly created task groups reporting to the IAU Working Group for Planetary and Satellite Nomenclature.

He received the Talbert Abrams Award of the American Society of Photogrammetry in 1974. In 1999 he was elected a Fellow of the American Geophysical Union.

At the time of his death, he was credited with "single-handedly observing more of the solar system than any other human," by Torrence Johnson, Jet Propulsion Laboratory project scientist of Project Galileo.

The Martian crater Davies is named after him. It is situated on the prime meridian, appropriate because Davies established its location.
