= Amrom Harry Katz =

American physicist (1915–1997)

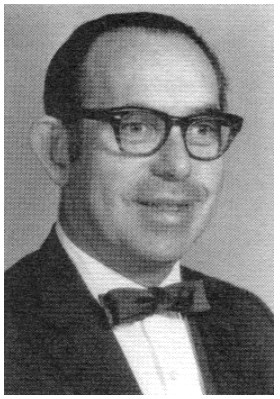
- Born: August 15, 1915; Chicago, Illinois, US
- Died: February 9, 1997 (aged 81); Santa Monica, California, US
- Education: University of Wisconsin
- Occupations: Physicist, technologist
- Years active: 1940–1980s
- Known for: Development of photogrammetry and satellite reconnaissance during Cold War; panoramic photography
- Notable work: One of ten National Reconnaissance Office founders, RAND Corporation leader, CORONA spy satellite program, Battle of Inchon
- Board member of: Arms Control and Disarmament Agency, Committee on International Security and Arms Control, World Federalist Movement/Institute for Global Policy
- Awards: Society of Photographic Instrumentation Engineers (SPIE) George W. Goddard Award, Operations Research Society of America Space Sciences Award

Amrom Harry Katz (August 15, 1915 – February 9, 1997) was an American physicist and intelligence technologist who was a key figure in the development of aerial and satellite reconnaissance during the Cold War. Over a five-decade career spanning World War II, the Korean War, and the Cold War, Katz contributed to advances in airborne camera systems, photogrammetry, and space-based surveillance.

He served as a civilian photo scientist for the U.S. Army Air Corps and later at Wright-Patterson Air Force Base, where he improved aerial imaging techniques and helped document the 1946 nuclear weapons testing at Bikini Atoll. During the Korean War, he devised a novel tidal prediction method that supported the amphibious landing at the Battle of Inchon. From 1954 to 1969, Katz worked at the RAND Corporation, where his collaboration with Merton Davies led to the concept of a recoverable film-return satellite, leading to the CORONA spy satellite program. In later declassified histories, the National Reconnaissance Office (NRO) credited Katz and Davies with originating the concept of photographic film-return reconnaissance satellites, and Katz was posthumously recognized by the NRO in 2000 as one of its ten founders.

Katz later promoted the civilian use of reconnaissance technologies and served as Assistant Director of the U.S. Arms Control and Disarmament Agency (appointed in 1973), where he advocated using satellite surveillance for treaty verification. His contributions to airborne and space reconnaissance were recognized with the Society of Photographic Instrumentation Engineers (SPIE) George W. Goddard Award and the Operational Research Society Space Sciences Award. Katz died of complications from Parkinson's disease in 1997.

== Early life and education ==
Amrom Harry Katz was born in Chicago on August 15, 1915, to Max Katz, who managed real estate properties, and Lena Katz, a homemaker. He had two brothers: Yale, who worked on the advanced-systems staff at Thompson Ramo Wooldridge's Sensor System Laboratory, and Matty. Before Katz was a year old, the family moved to Milwaukee, Wisconsin, where he later graduated from West Division High School (now Milwaukee High School of the Arts). Katz was a member of Milwaukee's first Hebrew high school class. At the University of Wisconsin, Katz studied physics and mathematics and earned a bachelor's degree. Katz later undertook graduate study at the Massachusetts Institute of Technology (MIT).

== Army Air Corps ==
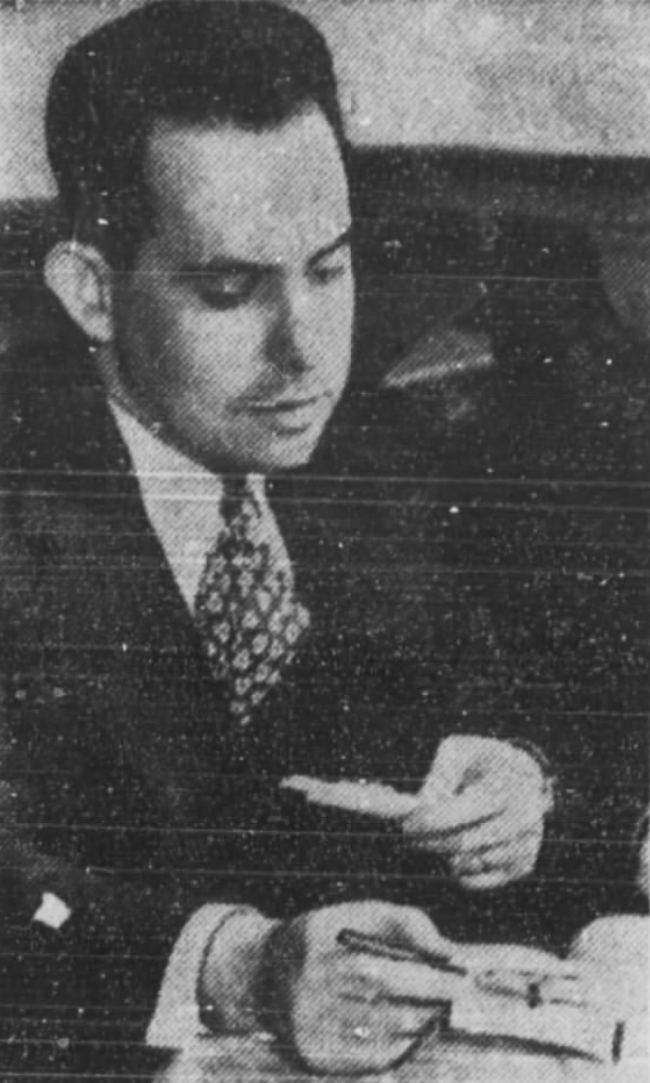
Amrom H. Katz in 1946.

In 1940, Katz began work as a junior physicist in the United States Army Air Corps research and development division. In 1941, Katz began thirteen years of work at the photographic laboratory at Wright Field in Dayton, Ohio, later renamed Wright-Patterson Air Force Base. His wartime work included the development of equipment for aerial reconnaissance. Photogrammetry expert Ronald J. Ondrejka credited Katz with improving Air Corps aerial cameras during World War II through changes to their hardware and electrical systems. At Wright Field, Katz developed what the National Air and Space Museum calls the "aerial photographic computer". The device used a baseboard and 18 transparent Mylar overlays to calculate photographic coverage, nadir-point distances, and effective altitudes.

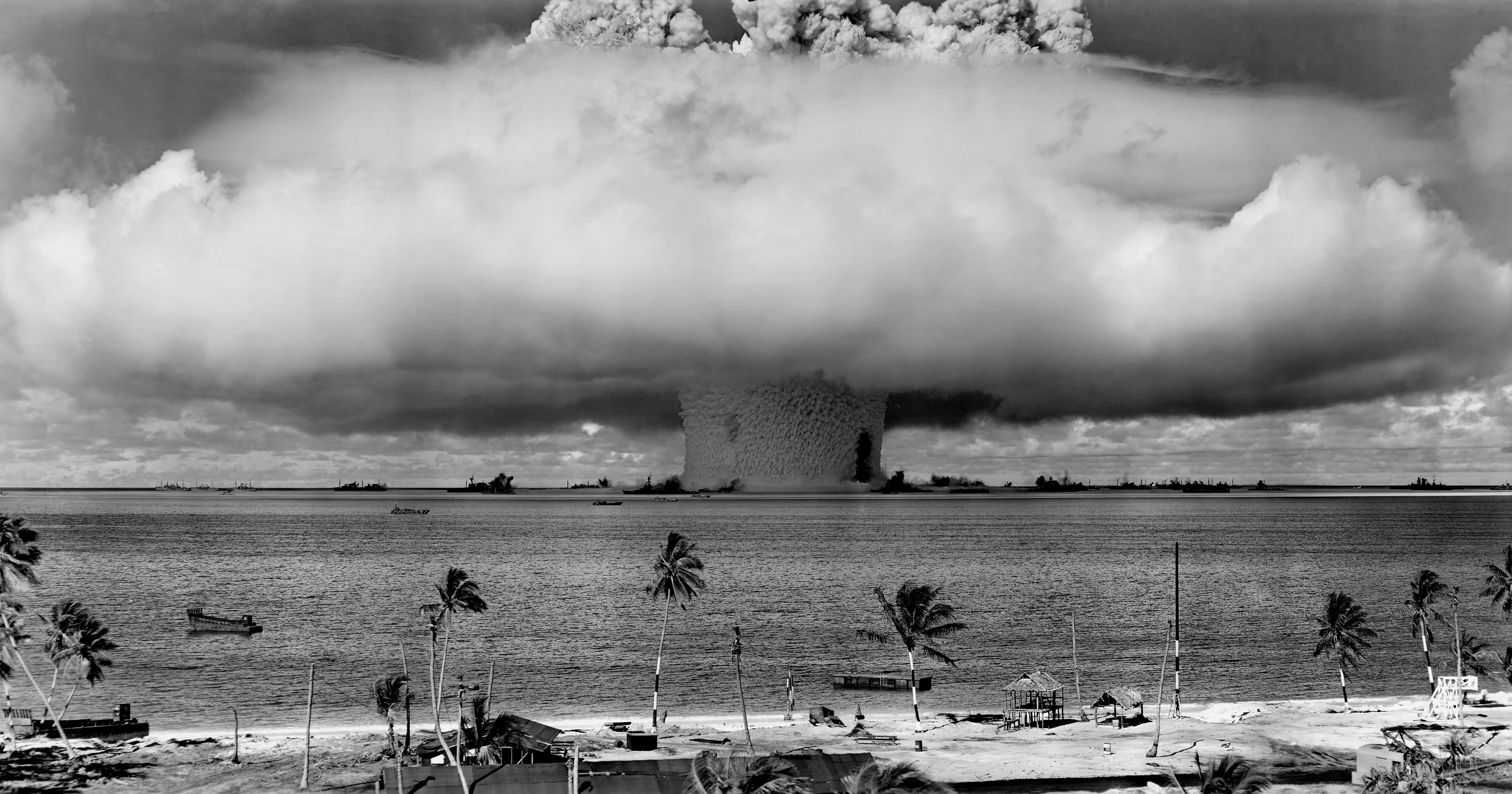
The Operation Crossroads Baker test at Bikini Atoll on July 25, 1946. Katz served as a staff physicist and technical adviser and coordinated the operation's photographic documentation.

Albert Einstein and Katz corresponded about publicizing the work of the Emergency Committee of Atomic Scientists, including an exchange of open letters between Einstein and four Soviet scientists. Katz participated in Operation Crossroads, the nuclear tests at Bikini Atoll. Based at Kwajalein Atoll, he served as a staff physicist and technical advisor. For the 1946 Bikini Atoll atomic bomb tests, Katz coordinated the operation's photographic documentation. A later American Society for Photogrammetry and Remote Sensing memorial called Katz the tests' "principal civilian photo scientist" for oblique aerial photography. RAND alumnus Bob Specht recalled that, while reporters waited for the Bikini tests, Katz arranged for horseshoes and manure packed in dry ice to be delivered to the atoll, then used them to stage horse tracks along its main street.

Katz developed a photogrammetric method during the Korean War to derive tidal data from aerial imagery. The Los Angeles Times reported that Katz was sent to Korea to identify a landing area for 1950's Battle of Inchon operations during the Korean War. The Los Angeles Times also credited him with developing a photographic technique for estimating tidal heights used in planning the landing's timing. According to The New York Times, Katz estimated the height of the Inchon seawall by applying trigonometric analysis to a timed sequence of aerial photographs, concluding that it would not seriously impede the Marine landing. In October 1950, H. W. McElwain, then Commander Amphibious Group One, informed Katz that measured seawall heights at Inchon's Red and Blue Beaches were within 0.4 and 0.9 feet, respectively, of Katz's estimates.

Davies and Harris wrote that Katz urged Bernard Schriever to interview Richard S. Leghorn, after which Schriever requested Leghorn's transfer from Wright Field to his development-planning staff at the Pentagon to integrate U.S. Air Force planning for intelligence and reconnaissance. Leghorn became responsible for planning the Air Force's reconnaissance needs for the following decade, and the Air Force credited his work on Project Lincoln and its Beacon Hill Report with helping lay the groundwork for the Lockheed U-2 reconnaissance aircraft.

By 1951, Katz as the chief physicist of the Wright Field reconnaissance laboratory. That year, RAND researchers James Everett Lipp and Robert Salter briefed Katz and other Wright Field personnel on a proposed television-imaging reconnaissance satellite. Katz recalled forming an ad hoc committee with Walter Levison and Duncan Macdonald of the Boston University Optical Research Laboratories and Air Force liaison Richard Philbrick to "prove that this proposed project was ridiculous". He described their initial response as a "heavy dose of skepticcocus". Davies and Harris described the briefing as the Wright Field staff's introduction to satellite reconnaissance concepts.

== RAND corporation ==
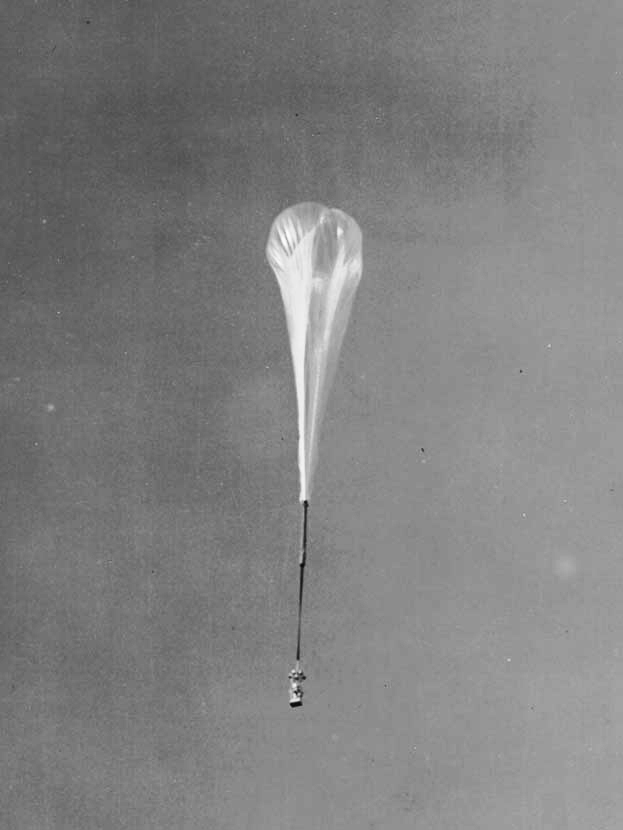
An escaped skyhook balloon was part of the inspiration process that led to the creation of reconnaissance satellites.

Following the favorable reception of Project Feedback in 1954, the RAND Corporation recruited Katz for his nearly fifteen years of experience in photoreconnaissance and camera technology. At RAND, Katz studied reconnaissance systems based on aircraft, balloons, and satellite reconnaissance platforms. William E. Burrows in Smithsonian Magazine identified Katz as part of the group that conceived the CORONA program, alongside Richard M. Bissell Jr., Edwin Land, James Gilbert Baker, Edward Mills Purcell, Merton Davies, and James R. Killian. Burrows described the men as a "fraternity of grown-up whiz kids" who worked together congenially. Historian Dwayne A. Day described Katz and Merton Davies as RAND's leading reconnaissance "wizards". According to Day, Katz excelled at turning existing concepts into detailed proposals for United States Air Force action.

=== Satellite reconnaissance creation ===
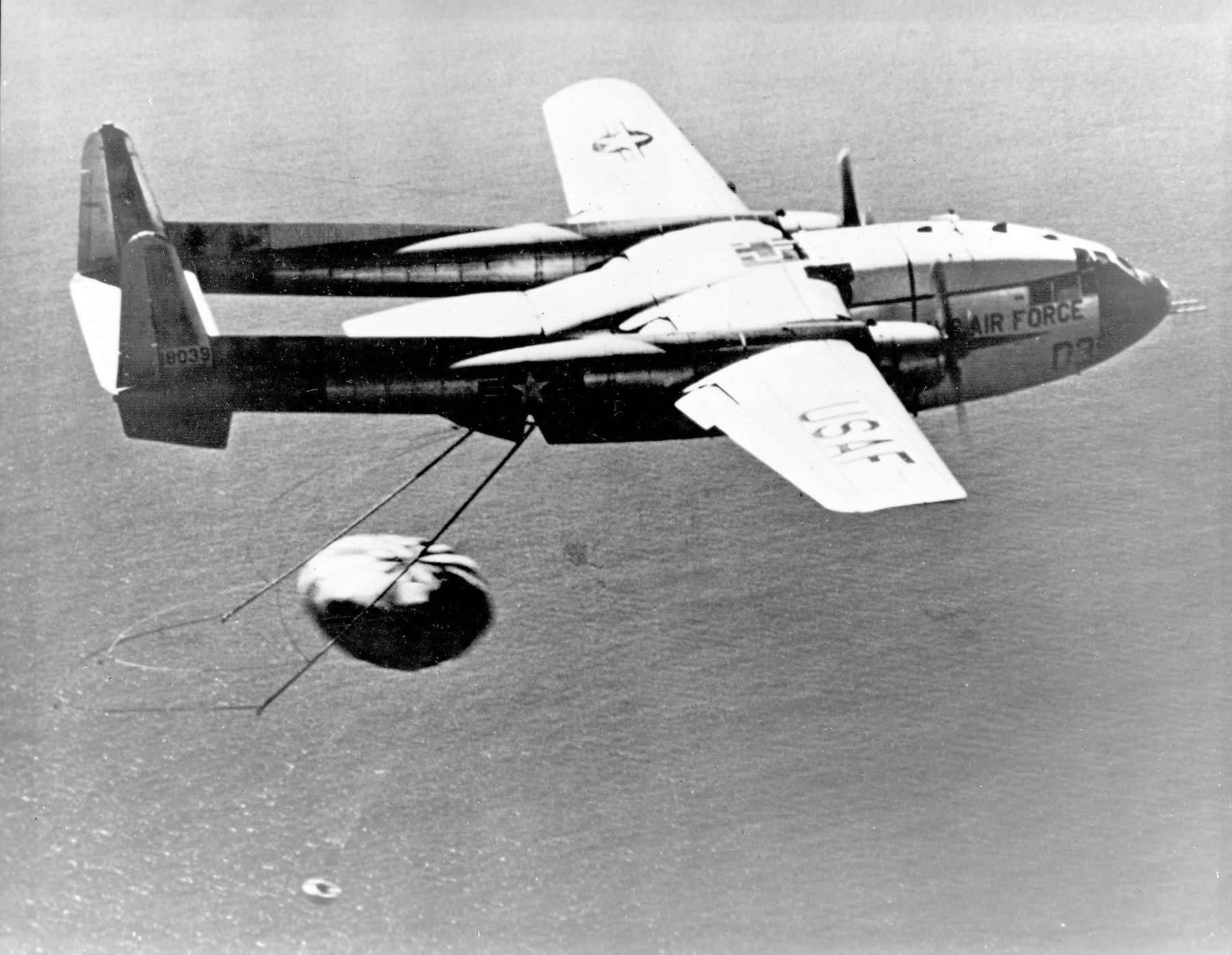
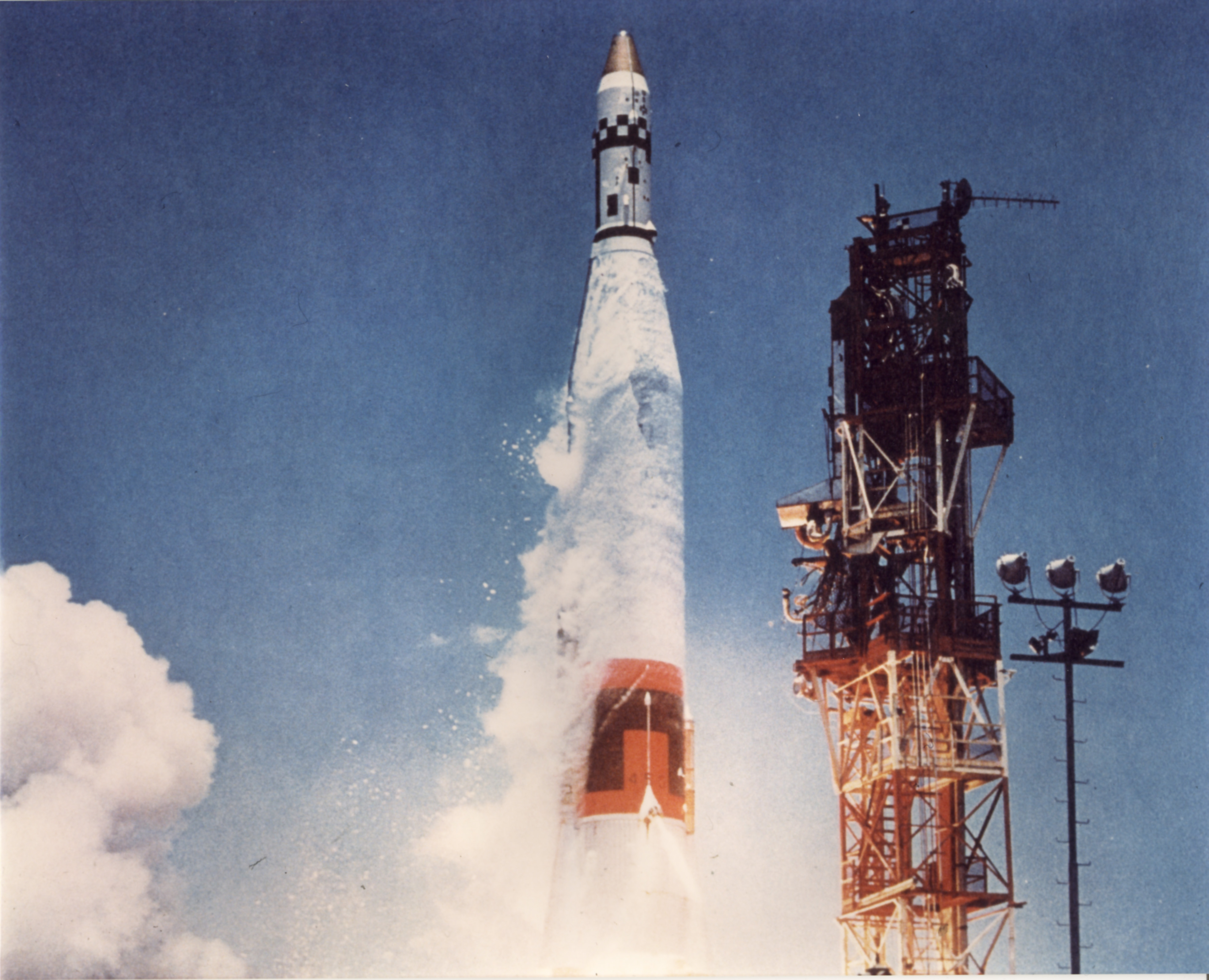
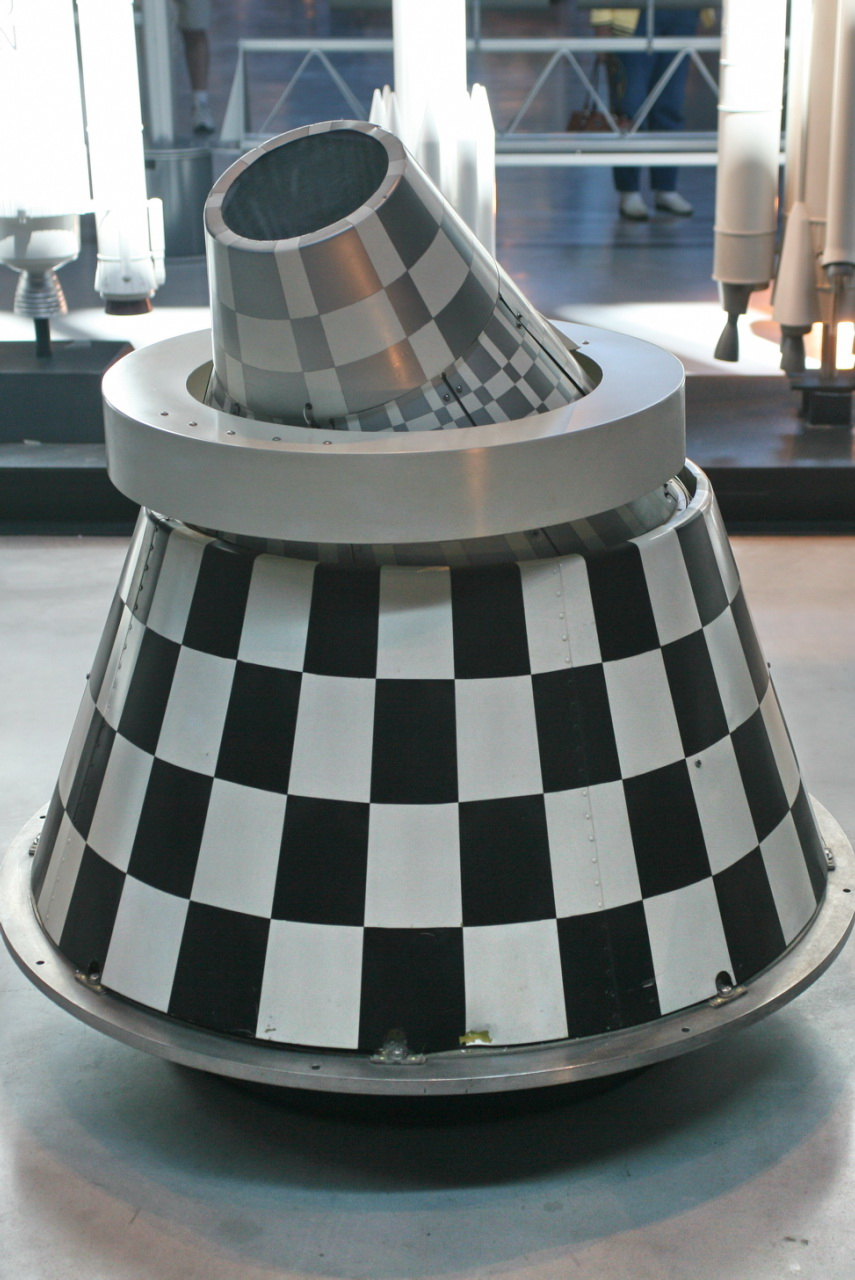
Katz influenced the history of artificial satellite programs, including CORONA, SAMOS and MIDAS.

After Katz joined RAND in 1954, he worked with Davies and others on space-based reconnaissance systems that many had "dismissed as impossible". RAND studied high-altitude balloons as photographic reconnaissance platforms. Katz attributed RAND's interest in balloon reconnaissance partly to an escaped skyhook balloon that passed over parts of the Soviet Union undetected. Davies and Katz were the two RAND researchers who had worked on both balloon reconnaissance and the developmental phase of space observation satellites. In an October 1956 memorandum, they proposed analyzing balloons, missiles, special aircraft, and satellites within a single reconnaissance framework rather than designing satellite missions in isolation. Katz favored deploying useful reconnaissance systems quickly rather than delaying for theoretically superior performance, summarizing the approach as "50 feet of ground resolution in '59 is infinitely better than five feet in '65".

Katz tested the potential usefulness of orbital imagery by having photographs taken from a high-flying aircraft with a short focal length 35 mm camera to simulate photographic scales expected from space-based systems. In 1957, Katz and Davies devised the concept of a recoverable film-return satellite. Following the Soviet space successes of 1957 and Sputnik 1, Secretary of Defense Neil McElroy ordered the acceleration of WS-117L In June 1957, Katz pressed RAND to act on an outstanding request for assistance from the Air Force's Project 117L office. He proposed comparing balloon Project 461L and satellite Project 117L by reconnaissance level, mission, priority, timing, system performance, acceptability, data handling, and research needs. Katz recommended that he and Davies work full-time on both "pre-hostilities reconnaissance" projects.

In November 1957, Katz and Davies, working with several RAND coauthors, completed Research Memorandum RM-2012, later released in abridged form as A Family of Recoverable Satellites, together with a formal recommendation to the Air Force titled An Earlier Reconnaissance Satellite System. Davies and Harris wrote that RM-2012 and its accompanying briefings encouraged Air Force and Central Intelligence Agency (CIA) representatives to accelerate their reconnaissance-satellite plans, although the systems eventually developed differed from the RAND proposals. In January 1958, Katz argued that RAND's proposed imaging satellites were of little value for warning of a surprise attack, and could not be relied upon alone to provide a clear indication that an attack was imminent.

The film-return portion became the separate crash program CORONA. Other elements became MIDAS and Sentry, which was renamed SAMOS by the end of 1958. Davies and William R. Harris credited Katz with passing Davies' panoramic-camera concept to Walter Levison of the Boston University Physical Research Laboratories. Levison redesigned the camera while confined to a hospital bed with back pain, adapting the design to a long-focal-length system. Katz and Davies created the original scanning panoramic camera model for CORONA, which personnel at Itek later refined and developed.

Day wrote that once development began, Katz and Davies "were told that [the film-return project] had been cancelled and were not allowed to know of its existence". By 1959, Katz suspected a connection between Discoverer and the film-return effort he had been told was terminated. In late March 1959, Katz proposed modifying Samos to provide broad-area cloud imagery for reconnaissance planning and capsule recovery. To avoid jurisdictional disputes with other federal agencies, he described it as a "cloud reconnaissance satellite" rather than a weather or meteorological satellite. His references to recoverable satellites in the 1959 draft drew official attention. Officials subsequently briefed Katz on CORONA. Day wrote that he then "had to stop mentioning the project outside of formal channels".

=== National Reconnaissance Office founder ===
Katz was among ten people whom the National Reconnaissance Office (NRO) later named as "Founders", whose advice, contributions and influence led to the agency's establishment in 1961. The NRO's very existence would remain a classified state secret until September 18, 1992.

=== Arms control ===
During preparations for the 1958 Conference of Experts to Study the Possible Measures Which Might be Helpful in Preventing Surprise Attack in Geneva, Switzerland, Katz served as a technical adviser and argued that reconnaissance satellites would make inspections "inevitable" and help force agreement on some degree of international oversight of armaments.

=== Impacts on aerospace and intelligence doctrines ===
During the 1960s, Katz argued that reconnaissance technology could also support civilian mapping and scientific research. He focused particularly on reducing the time required to extract and report useful information from aerospace imagery. While at RAND, Katz advocated peacetime aerial surveillance of the Soviet Union as a means of checking adherence to arms control agreements. In 1963, Air & Space Forces Magazine discussed Katz's 1959 RAND paper, where he observed that some World War II-era photointerpreters had dismissed the idea that high-altitude photography "might ever be useful." Brugioni recounted that a Soviet scientist at a 1960 conference praised the U-2's imagery as "damn good pictures".

In a 1972 memorandum for the NRO titled Preliminary Thoughts on Crises: More Questions Than Answers, Katz wrote that American space assets had been "protected by assumption—the belief that nobody would interfere with their operation", and warned that their development could influence adversary behavior by presenting "juicier targets". Katz outlined four non-exhaustive approaches to protecting space systems: making satellites harder to attack, harder to detect, and easier to replace, and preparing to destroy an adversary's satellites. Writing for the Center for Strategic and Budgetary Assessments, Todd Harrison used Katz's framework as a starting point for his analysis of modern military satellite communications, building several of his proposed options around making systems harder to attack and easier to replace.

Butz in Air & Space Forces Magazine summarized Katz's rules for practical aerial camera design as "There is no substitute for focal length", and it was more critical than scale factor; "There is no substitute for shutter speed", and "Make it as big as you can", arguing that miniaturization offered no photographic benefits. Katz argued that natural resource surveys may encounter less resistance from foreign locals and nations if their remote-sensing equipment was carried aboard aircraft piloted by nationals of the country being studied rather than aboard satellites.

== Arms Control and Disarmament Agency ==
By 1964, Katz was serving as a consultant to the Arms Control and Disarmament Agency ACDA, nearly a decade before his appointment as an assistant director of the agency. In 1973, U.S. President Richard Nixon appointed Katz Assistant Director of the ACDA. By 1975, Katz was assistant director of the ACDA for Plans and Analysis. At ACDA, Katz worked on the use of overhead surveillance to verify compliance with arms control agreements. In 1975, Katz said that the United States should not respond automatically to an apparent nuclear attack, but should first verify its source.

Richard V. Allen described Katz as known for gallows humor and recalled arranging a 1981 briefing in which Katz joked to President Ronald Reagan that American intelligence had failed to uncover anything the Soviets had managed to conceal successfully. Dino Brugioni wrote that Arthur C. Lundahl repeated Katz's criticism that imagery from costly reconnaissance missions was still being examined with a "ten cent magnifying glass". Throughout his career, Katz participated in arms control and disarmament forums in the United States and abroad, including the Arden House Strategy for Peace Conferences, several meetings of the American Assembly, the Stowe Conference of Scientists on World Affairs, and the Accra Assembly in Ghana. Katz participated in the 1960 Pugwash Conferences on Science and World Affairs, where American and Soviet participants discussed disarmament.

== Related works and writings ==
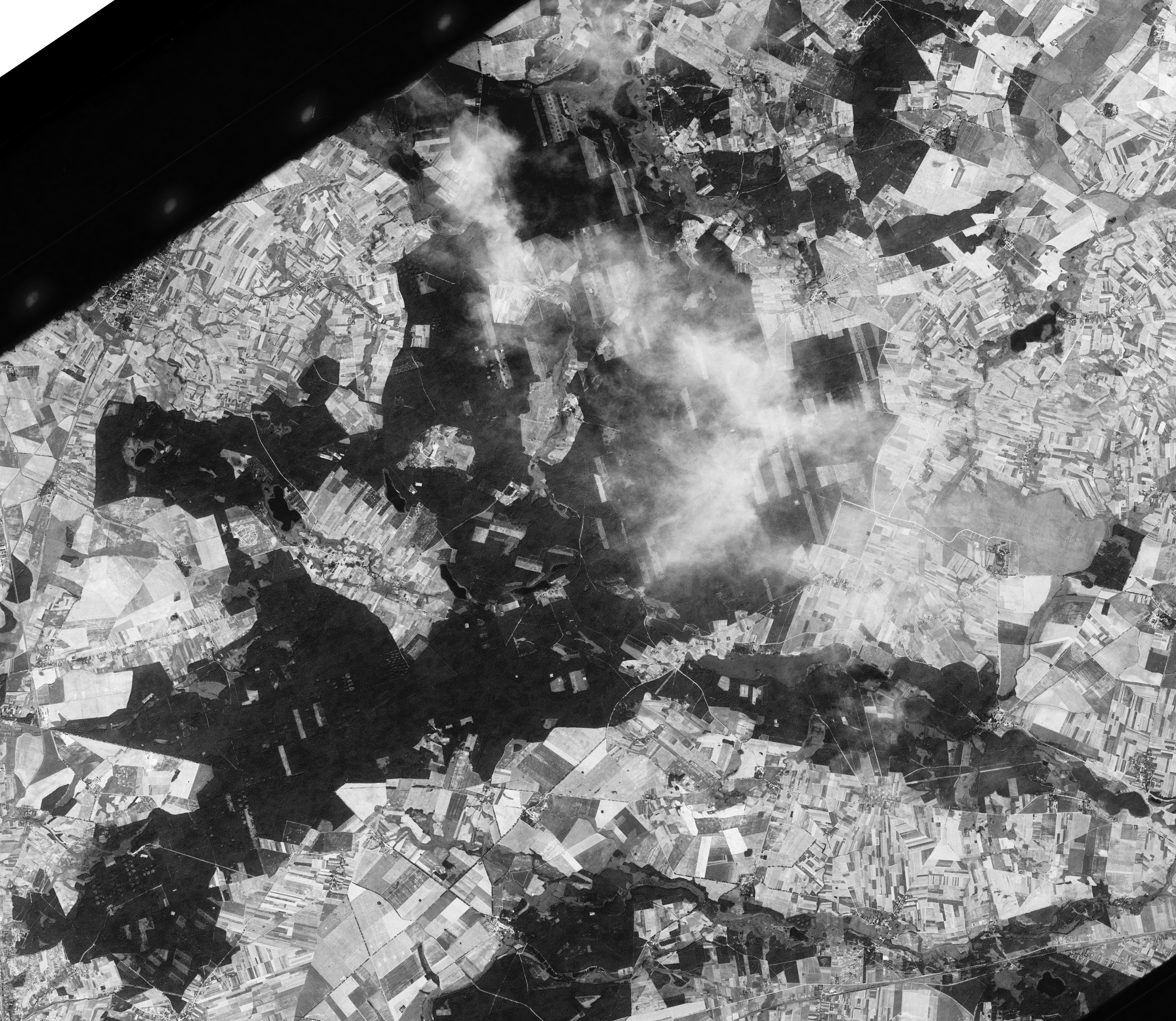
The Puszcza Zielonka forest in Poland, photographed by a CORONA reconnaissance satellite in 1965. Katz advocated adapting reconnaissance technology for civilian mapping, scientific research, and natural-resource surveys.

An American Society for Photogrammetry and Remote Sensing oral history recalled that Katz visited the International Institute for Geo-Information Science and Earth Observation while recruiting for a program, encouraged awareness of the American Society of Photogrammetry, and arranged an interview with Itek for one of the institute's graduates. The same interviewee subsequently worked on CORONA imagery at Itek as a technical liaison with imagery-user communities. Katz was acquainted with Dutch photogrammetrist Willem Schermerhorn, founder of the International Training Centre, whom ASPRS described as Katz's friend. Brugioni quoted him on the distinction between a mapping camera and a reconnaissance camera: "Mapping photography is designed to give information about the character of the terrain; reconnaissance/intelligence photography is designed to give information about characters on the terrain."

In 1963, Katz was a professor in residence of political science at UCLA and a senior fellow in its National Security Studies Program. Katz was a long-time member of United World Federalists and served on its National Executive Council. He was an original member of the National Planning Association's Committee on Security Through Arms Control, served on the Board of Sponsors of War/Peace Report and the board of Disarmament and Arms Control, and sat on the advisory board of the Journal of Arms Control.

A 1968 report by Chile’s Instituto de Investigación de Recursos Naturales described Katz as a specialist in orbital photography. Herman Kahn, in On Thermonuclear War, credited Katz with coining the term "catalytic war" to describe a conflict intentionally started by a third country to provoke two major powers into fighting one another. William W. Herrmann of the System Development Corporation cited Katz's characterization of the traditional approach to conflict as "first fight, then make peace, and then rebuild", with the cycle repeated as necessary, and said Katz considered this sequential model incompatible with conflict in less-developed or developing countries.

In 1969, John L. McLucas, then Director of the National Reconnaissance Office (DNRO), wrote that Katz felt "imagination formerly prevalent in the reconnaissance business is waning". As an example of neglected intelligence priorities, Katz argued that estimating Chinese food production could be as important as estimating Soviet missile production because relatively small variations in crop yields could have major consequences for China. Katz's tenure at RAND continued through 1969. Katz had spoken to numerous youth groups throughout the United States and publicly opposed unilateral U.S. disarmament, calling it "dangerous". Davies and Harris wrote that Katz considered his "most important work" at RAND to be defining reconnaissance requirements rather than devising and developing the systems used to meet them. Day noted that Katz's RAND discussion papers often contained "wry, slightly sarcastic remarks about the military bureaucracy".

== Awards and legacy ==
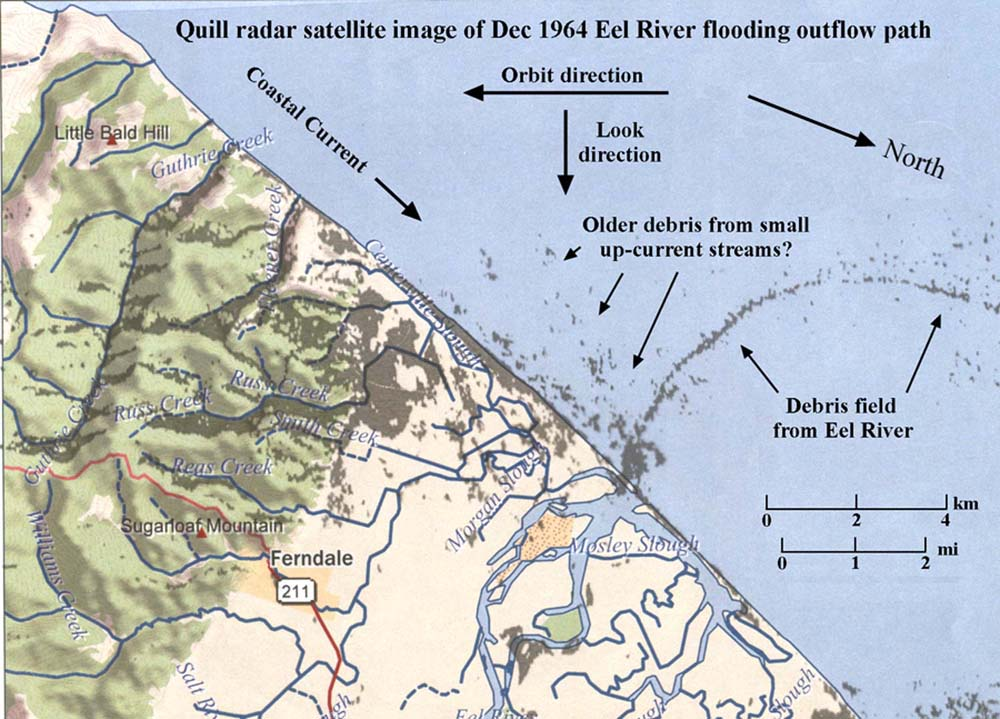
A Quill satellite radar image of California's Eel River during the December 1964 floods, overlaid on a United States Geological Survey base map. Katz promoted nonmilitary applications of reconnaissance, including environmental resource management and disaster response.

In the NRO's 1987 then-classified history The Corona Story, Katz and Davies were credited with originating a key concept in RAND's 1957 proposal for a recoverable photographic reconnaissance satellite. Katz received the Society of Photographic Instrumentation Engineers George W. Goddard Award in 1963. In 1970, Katz received the first Space Sciences Award from the Operations Research Society of America. Writing in Cartography and Geographic Information Science, historian John Cloud identified Katz's work in analytical photogrammetry and panoramic camera design as among his fundamental contributions, crediting Katz and Davies with the original CORONA scanning panoramic camera model. In 2000, the National Reconnaissance Office recognized Katz as one of its ten "Founders".

General George William Goddard referred to him as "Slide-Rule Katz". In a 2005 Center for the Study of Intelligence monograph, Jeffrey R. Cooper described Katz as a "pioneer in aerial and overhead reconnaissance" in a footnote attributing to him the aphorism "You rarely find what you’re not looking for and usually do find what you are looking for". U.S. Air Force officer Larry K. Grundhauser, writing in Airpower Journal, called Katz "an arms-control legend and father of NTM", or national technical means of verification (NTM), verification methods that included the use of imagery satellites for arms-control monitoring. At the 1962 Woods Hole Summer Study on verification and disarmament, Katz introduced William R. Harris to the potential for NTM to supplement or replace on-site inspections. In 1964, Air Force/Space Digest described Katz as an "outstanding expert on aerial and space reconnaissance", citing his work first with the Air Force and then with RAND.

Journalist Susan Landon described Katz as "a pioneer in the problem of verification of arms control proposals". The New York Times reported that Katz identified nonmilitary uses for reconnaissance technology in environmental resource management and disaster response. Katz was later critical of what he regarded as administrative complacency in U.S. reconnaissance planning and of assumptions underlying unilateral inspection in arms-limitation discussions. He questioned practices involving covert reconnaissance flights through the Berlin air corridors, collection requirements inherited without reevaluation, limited nighttime observation capabilities, the use of satellites rather than aircraft for earth-resource surveys, and technical compromises in a planned NASA satellite. Brigadier General Noel F. Parrish, commanding officer of the Tuskegee Airmen, cited Katz's warning that the proliferation of charts could encourage analysts to list whatever numerical data were available and treat them as relevant, whether or not they actually were, and noted that Bernard Brodie shared Katz's view. Parrish described Katz as "a RAND expert with a talent for humility" while discussing Katz's criticism of excessive reliance on quantitative analysis.

== Private life and death ==
Katz was married for 56 years to Louise Katz (née Klibanow). He had a son, Michael, two daughters, Barbara and Deborah, and six grandchildren. In 1970, Katz served on the board of trustees of Temple Beth Shalom.

He died at St. Johns Hospital and Health Center in Santa Monica, California, on February 9, 1997. His son Michael said that the cause was complications from Parkinson's disease.

== Bibliography ==
- Katz, Amrom H., and Merton E. Davies. "Proposed Project for Engineering Division". Memorandum to Ed Barlow, October 12, 1956.
- Katz, Amrom H. Balloon Reconnaissance—Part I: Intelligence Requirements and Reconnaissance Systems. RAND Corporation, May 1957.
- Davies, Merton E., Amrom H. Katz, Robert W. Buchheim, T. F. Burke, R. T. Gabler, T. B. Garber, Carl Gazley, E. C. Heffern, J. R. Huntzicker, H. A. Lieske, and David J. Masson. A Family of Recoverable Reconnaissance Satellites. RAND Corporation, Research Memorandum RM-2012-PR, November 12, 1957.
- Davies, Merton E., and Amrom H. Katz. An Early Reconnaissance Satellite System. Recommendation to the Air Staff, November 12, 1957.
- Katz, Amrom H. "Reconnaissance Satellite and Comments on Your [Washington Memorandum]". Memorandum to L. J. Henderson and R. J. Lew, January 3, 1958.
- Katz, Amrom H. Observation Satellites: Problems, Possibilities, and Prospects. RAND Corporation, Paper P-1707, May 1959.
- Katz, Amrom H. "Observation Satellites: Problems and Prospects". In six parts. Astronautics, Vol. 5, Nos. 4, 6, 7, 8, 9, and 10, May–October 1960.
- Katz, Amrom H. "The Technological Environment and Its Prospects". In International Political Implications of Activities in Outer Space: A Report of a Conference. RAND Corporation, Report R-362-RC, May 5, 1960.
- Katz, Amrom H. "Some Things to Do and Some to Think". Bulletin of the Atomic Scientists, Vol. 17, No. 4, April 1961, pp. 139–143.
- Katz, Amrom H. "Good Disarmament—and Bad". Air and Space Forces Digest, May 1961.
- Katz, Amrom H. "Make the World Safe for Disarmament". War/Peace Report, September 1962.
- Katz, Amrom H. "The Stumbling Block of Soviet Secrecy". War/Peace Report, October 1962.
- Katz, Amrom H. "Clichés, Complexes and Contingencies". War/Peace Report, October 1962.
- Katz, Amrom H. The Soviets and the U-2 Photos – an Heuristic Argument. RAND Corporation, Paper RM-3584-PR, March 1963.
- Katz, Amrom H., ed. Selected Readings in Aerial Reconnaissance. RAND Corporation, Paper P-2762, August 1963.
- Katz, Amrom H. "A Tribute to George W. Goddard". Airpower Historian, No. 10, October 1963, pp. 101–109.
- Katz, Amrom H. "The Myth of Overkill". Air & Space Forces Magazine, February 1, 1964.
- Katz, Amrom H. Reflections on Satellites for Earth Resource Surveys. RAND Corporation, Paper P-3753, 1967.
- Katz, Amrom H. "The Short Run and the Long Walk". Air Force, June 1967.
- Katz, Amrom H. "A Guide for the Perplexed, or a Minimal/Maxim-al Handbook for Tourists in a Classified Bureaucracy". Air and Space Forces Digest, November 1967.
- Katz, Amrom H. "Recommendations, Formal and Informal, on Reconnaissance Satellite Matters". Memorandum to J. L. Hult, May 11, 1969.
- Katz, Amrom H. "Let Aircraft Make Earth-Resource Surveys". Astronautics and Aeronautics, June 1969.
- Katz, Amrom H. "Some Notes on the Development of High Resolution in Aerial Photography". RAND Corporation, c. 1970.
- Katz, Amrom H. "Verification of SALT: The State of the Art and the Art of the State". National Security Record, April 1979.
- Katz, Amrom H. "Psychologist's Cure for Arms Race Questioned". War/Peace Report, January 1982.

== See also ==
- Sentient (intelligence analysis system)
