= Davies (crater) =

Crater on Mars

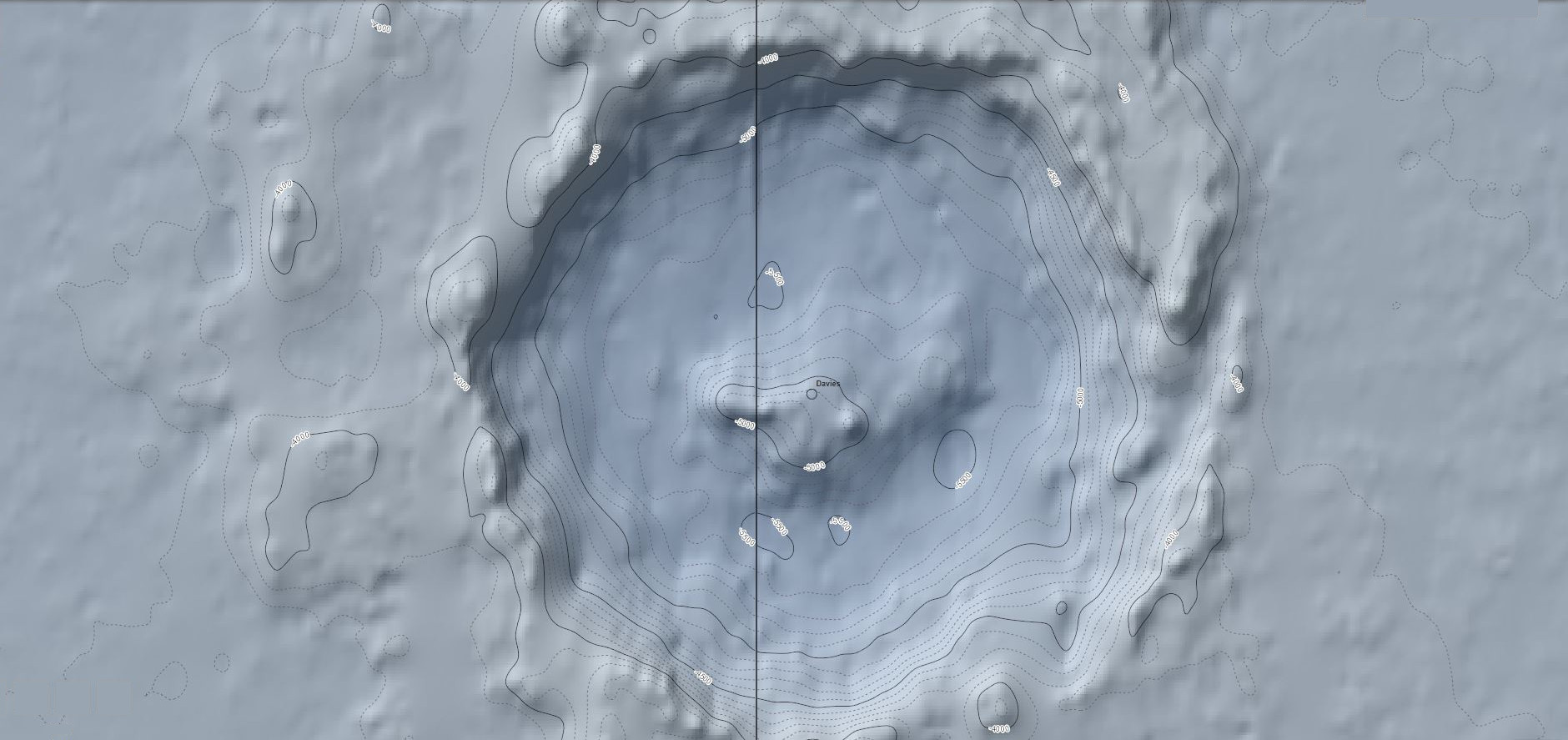
- This image is a screenshot of RedMapper's website and shows the Davies crater near Arabia Terra
- Planet: Mars
- Coordinates: 45.96°N 0.09°W
- Quadrangle: Mare Acidalium
- Diameter: 48.06
- Eponym: Merton Davies

Davies is a crater on Mars located at 46°N 0°E on the fringe of Acidalia Planitia near Arabia Terra. It is approximately 48 km in diameter. The crater's name was formally approved by the IAU in 2006.

It was named in honor of Merton Davies (1917–2001), a pioneer in the cartography of planetary bodies. An employee of the RAND Corporation, he assisted NASA in mapping Mars with colleagues Gérard de Vaucouleurs and Harold Masursky and defined the prime meridian of Mars as passing through the crater Airy-0. Davies Crater lies on the prime meridian, appropriate because Davies was responsible for its delineation.

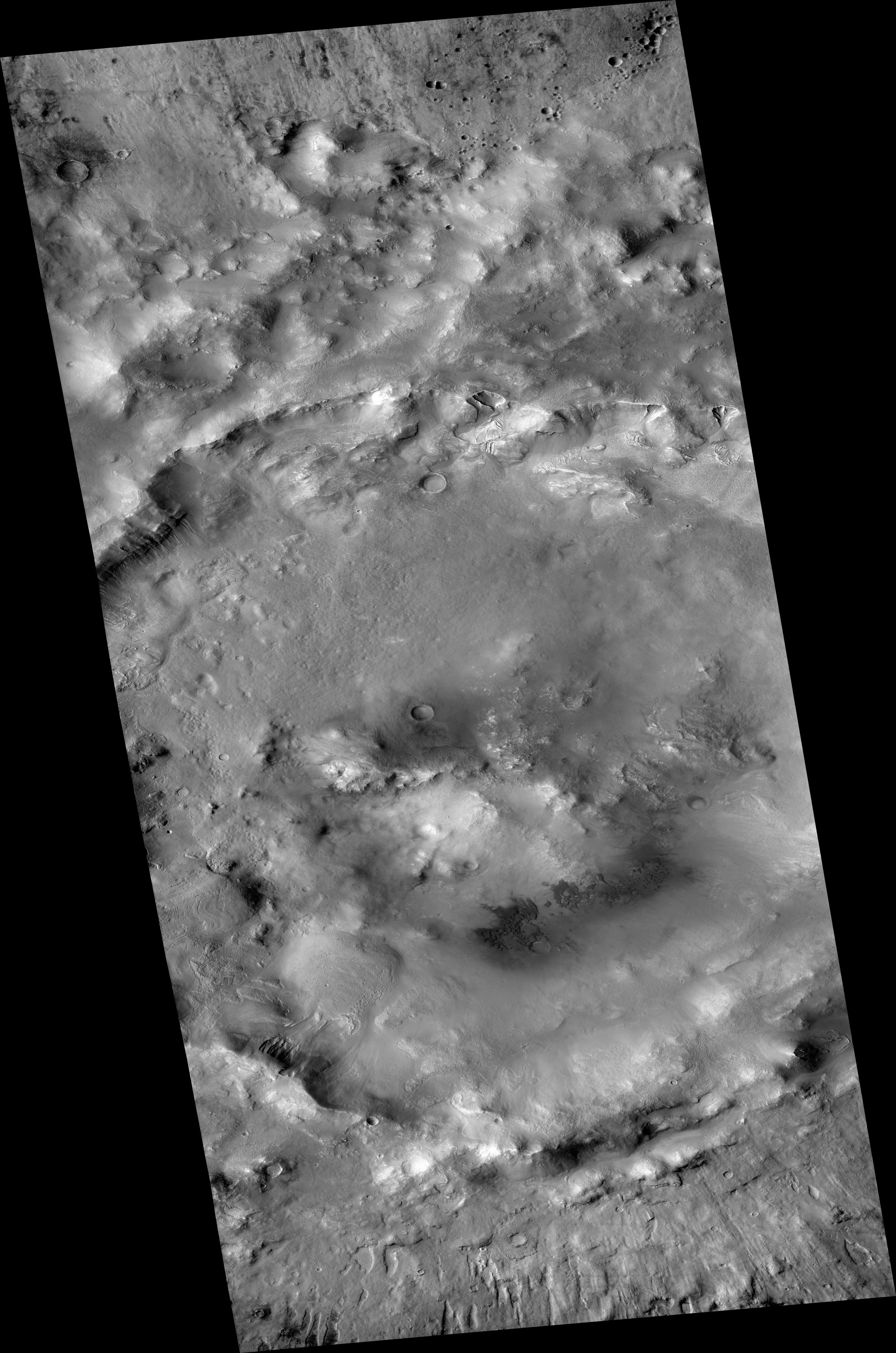
Davies crater, MRO CTX camera

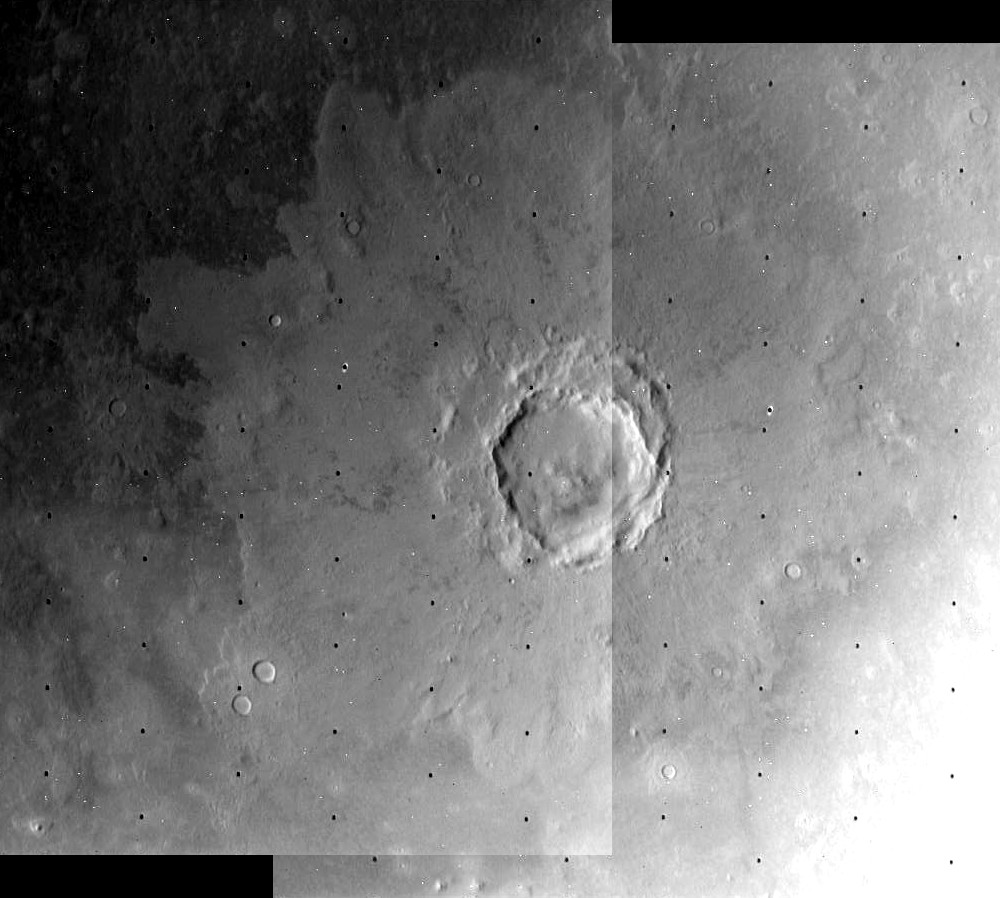
Viking Orbiter 2 mosaic showing the crater and its extensive ejecta
