= Planetary coordinate system =

Coordinate system for planets

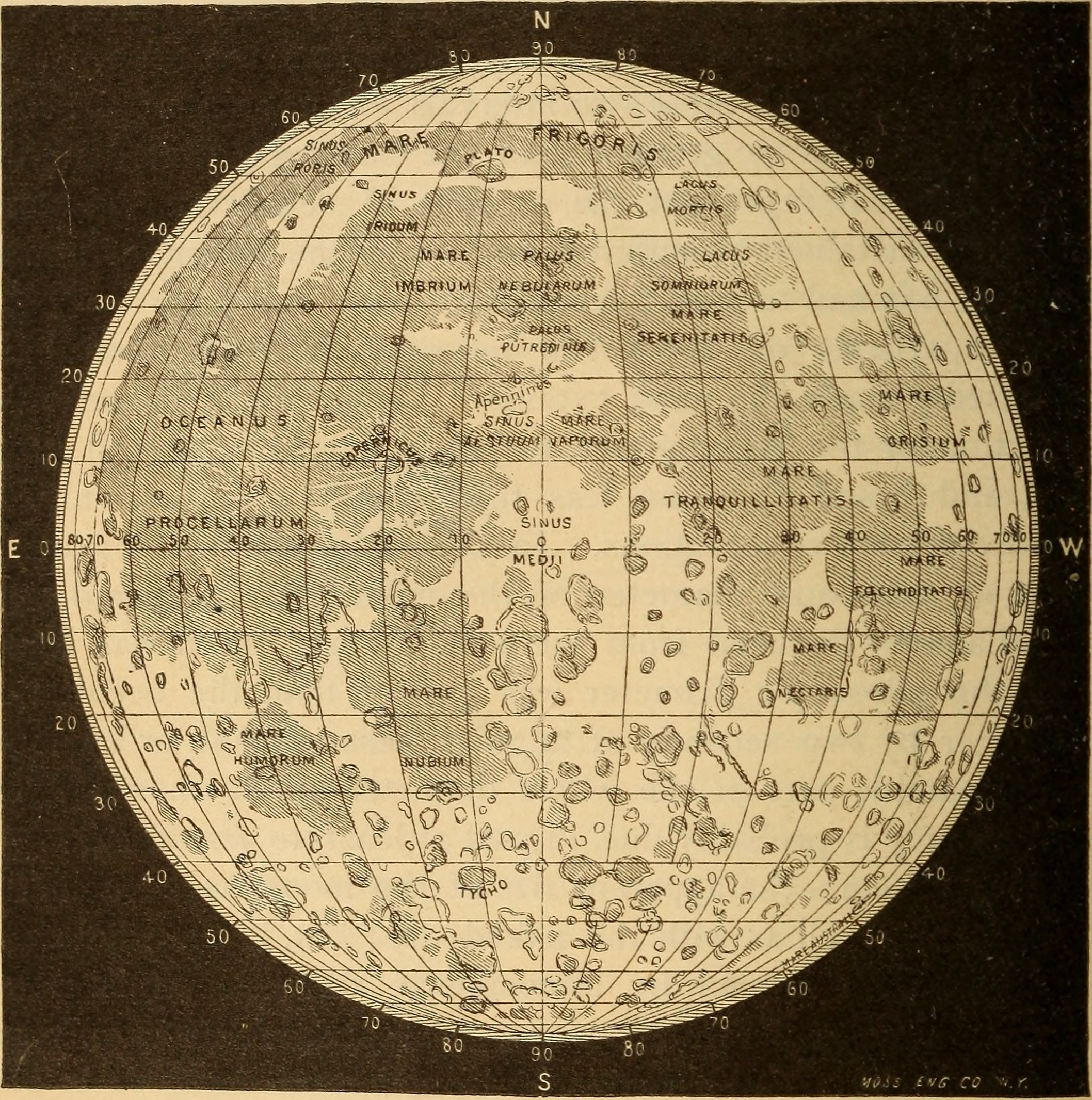
Chart of lunar maria with lines of longitude and latitude. The prime meridian is the centre of the near side of the Moon.

A planetary coordinate system (also referred to as planetographic, planetodetic, or planetocentric) is a generalization of the geographic, geodetic, and the geocentric coordinate systems for planets other than Earth. Similar coordinate systems are defined for other solid celestial bodies, such as in the selenographic coordinates for the Moon. The coordinate systems for almost all of the solid bodies in the Solar System were established by Merton E. Davies of the Rand Corporation, including Mercury, Venus, Mars, the four Galilean moons of Jupiter, and Triton, the largest moon of Neptune. A planetary datum is a generalization of geodetic datums for other planetary bodies, such as the Mars datum; it requires the specification of physical reference points or surfaces with fixed coordinates, such as a specific crater for the reference meridian or the best-fitting equigeopotential as zero-level surface.

== Longitude ==
The longitude systems of most of those bodies with observable rigid surfaces have been defined by references to a surface feature such as a crater. The north pole is that pole of rotation that lies on the north side of the invariable plane of the Solar System (near the ecliptic). The location of the prime meridian as well as the position of the body's north pole on the celestial sphere may vary with time due to precession of the axis of rotation of the planet (or satellite). If the position angle of the body's prime meridian increases with time, the body has a direct (or prograde) rotation; otherwise the rotation is said to be retrograde.

In the absence of other information, the axis of rotation is assumed to be normal to the mean orbital plane; Mercury and most of the satellites are in this category. For many of the satellites, it is assumed that the rotation rate is equal to the mean orbital period. In the case of the giant planets, since their surface features are constantly changing and moving at various rates, the rotation of their magnetic fields is used as a reference instead. In the case of the Sun, even this criterion fails (because its magnetosphere is very complex and does not really rotate in a steady fashion), and an agreed-upon value for the rotation of its equator is used instead.

For planetographic longitude, west longitudes (i.e., longitudes measured positively to the west) are used when the rotation is prograde, and east longitudes (i.e., longitudes measured positively to the east) when the rotation is retrograde. In simpler terms, imagine a distant, non-orbiting observer viewing a planet as it rotates. Also suppose that this observer is within the plane of the planet's equator. A point on the Equator that passes directly in front of this observer later in time has a higher planetographic longitude than a point that did so earlier in time.

However, planetocentric longitude is always measured positively to the east, regardless of which way the planet rotates. East is defined as the counterclockwise direction around the planet, as seen from above its north pole, and the north pole is whichever pole more closely aligns with the Earth's north pole. Longitudes traditionally have been written using "E" or "W" instead of "+" or "−" to indicate this polarity. For example, −91°, 91°W, +269° and 269°E all mean the same thing.

The modern standard for maps of Mars (since about 2002) is to use planetocentric coordinates. Guided by the works of historical astronomers, Merton E. Davies established the meridian of Mars at Airy-0 crater. For Mercury, the only other planet with a solid surface visible from Earth, a thermocentric coordinate is used: the prime meridian runs through the point on the equator where the planet is hottest (due to the planet's rotation and orbit, the Sun briefly retrogrades at noon at this point during perihelion, giving it more sunlight). By convention, this meridian is defined as exactly twenty degrees of longitude east of Hun Kal.

Tidally-locked bodies have a natural reference longitude passing through the point nearest to their parent body: 0° the center of the primary-facing hemisphere, 90° the center of the leading hemisphere, 180° the center of the anti-primary hemisphere, and 270° the center of the trailing hemisphere. However, libration due to non-circular orbits or axial tilts causes this point to move around any fixed point on the celestial body like an analemma.

== Latitude ==
Planetary latitude is an angular coordinate that measures the north-south position of a point on a planet's surface relative to the equator of that body. The zero latitude plane (equator) can be defined as orthogonal to the mean axis of rotation (poles of astronomical bodies). The reference surfaces for some planets (such as Earth and Mars) are ellipsoids of revolution for which the equatorial radius is larger than the polar radius, such that they are oblate spheroids.

Planetocentric latitude is defined as the angle measured between the equatorial plane and a line connecting the point of interest to the body's centre of mass.

Planetographic latitude is defined as the angle measured between the equatorial plane and a line normal to the surface of a reference body at the point of interest. For most planets, which are spheroid in shape, this reference surface is an ellipsoid. Since planetographic latitudes reflect the direction of local vertical, they are more meaningful for surface mapping, geology, lander and rover navigation, and cartography.

Planetodetic latitude can be defined as a planetographic latitude, whose reference body is specifically and precisely defined. This is important for smaller bodies like dwarf planets, asteroids, and comets, whose irregular surfaces deviate even from spheroids.

While the coordinate values of planetocentric, planetographic, and planetodetic longitudes are, for a given prime meridian, largely independent of a planetary body's shape (the east-west curvature of the body is largely constant), planetary latitudes vary much more considerably. For a perfect sphere, the planetocentric and planetographic latitudes coincide, and diverge with increasing oblateness.

The planetographic system is especially conducive to the study of gas giants for multiple reasons. Most notably, these planets are considerably more oblate than other planetary bodies in the solar system. Additionally, gas giants lack a well-defined surface, so planetographic latitudes (relative to a best-fit surface normal) align better with projected shapes as seen in observations, aiding the mapping of features such as cloud bands.

== Altitude ==
Vertical position can be expressed with respect to a given vertical datum, by means of physical quantities analogous to the topographical geocentric distance (compared to a constant nominal Earth radius or the varying geocentric radius of the reference ellipsoid surface) or altitude/elevation (above and below the geoid).

The areoid (the geoid of Mars) has been measured using flight paths of satellite missions such as Mariner 9 and Viking. The main departures from the ellipsoid expected of an ideal fluid are from the Tharsis volcanic plateau, a continent-size region of elevated terrain, and its antipodes.

The selenoid (the geoid of the Moon) has been measured gravimetrically by the GRAIL twin satellites.

== Ellipsoid of revolution (spheroid) ==
Reference ellipsoids are also useful for defining geodetic coordinates and mapping other planetary bodies including planets, their satellites, asteroids and comet nuclei. Some well observed bodies such as the Moon and Mars now have quite precise reference ellipsoids.

For rigid-surface nearly-spherical bodies, which includes all the rocky planets and many moons, ellipsoids are defined in terms of the axis of rotation and the mean surface height excluding any atmosphere. Mars is actually egg shaped, where its north and south polar radii differ by approximately 6 km (4 miles), however this difference is small enough that the average polar radius is used to define its ellipsoid. The Earth's Moon is effectively spherical, having almost no bulge at its equator. Where possible, a fixed observable surface feature is used when defining a reference meridian.

For gaseous planets like Jupiter, an effective surface for an ellipsoid is chosen as the equal-pressure boundary of one bar. Since they have no permanent observable features, the choices of prime meridians are made according to mathematical rules.

=== Flattening ===
Comparison of the rotation period (sped up 10 000 times, negative values denoting retrograde), flattening and axial tilt of the planets and the Moon (SVG animation)

For the WGS84 ellipsoid to model Earth, the defining values are

a (equatorial radius): 6 378 137.0 m
$\frac{1}{f}\,\!$ (inverse flattening): 298.257 223 563

from which one derives

b (polar radius): 6 356 752.3142 m,

so that the difference of the major and minor semi-axes is 21.385 km (13 mi). This is only 0.335% of the major axis, so a representation of Earth on a computer screen would be sized as 300 pixels by 299 pixels. This is rather indistinguishable from a sphere shown as 300 pix by 300 pix. Thus illustrations typically greatly exaggerate the flattening to highlight the concept of any planet's oblateness.

Other f values in the Solar System are 1/16 for Jupiter, 1/10 for Saturn, and 1/900 for the Moon. The flattening of the Sun is about 9×10^{−6}.

==== Origin of flattening ====
In 1687, Isaac Newton published the Principia in which he included a proof that a rotating self-gravitating fluid body in equilibrium takes the form of an oblate ellipsoid of revolution (a spheroid). The amount of flattening depends on the density and the balance of gravitational force and centrifugal force.

=== Equatorial bulge ===
Equatorial bulge of the Solar Systems major celestial bodies
Body	Diameter (km)		Equatorial bulge (km)	Flattening ratio	Rotation period (h)	Density (kg/m^{3})	$f$	Deviation from $f$
Body	Equatorial	Polar	Equatorial bulge (km)	Flattening ratio	Rotation period (h)	Density (kg/m^{3})	$f$	Deviation from $f$
Earth	12,756.2	12,713.6	42.6	1 : 299.4	23.936	5515	1 : 232	−23%
Mars	6,792.4	6,752.4	40	1 : 170	24.632	3933	1 : 175	+3%
Ceres	964.3	891.8	72.5	1 : 13.3	9.074	2162	1 : 13.1	−2%
Jupiter	142,984	133,708	9,276	1 : 15.41	9.925	1326	1 : 9.59	−38%
Saturn	120,536	108,728	11,808	1 : 10.21	10.56	687	1 : 5.62	−45%
Uranus	51,118	49,946	1,172	1 : 43.62	17.24	1270	1 : 27.71	−36%
Neptune	49,528	48,682	846	1 : 58.54	16.11	1638	1 : 31.22	−47%

Generally any celestial body that is rotating (and that is sufficiently massive to draw itself into a spherical or near spherical shape) will have an equatorial bulge matching its rotation rate. Saturn is the planet with the largest equatorial bulge in the Solar System, at 11,808 km.

==== Equatorial ridges ====
Equatorial bulges should not be confused with equatorial ridges. Equatorial ridges are a feature of at least four of Saturn's moons: the large moon Iapetus and the tiny moons Atlas, Pan, and Daphnis. These ridges closely follow the moons' equators. The ridges appear to be unique to the Saturnian system, but it is uncertain whether the occurrences are related or a coincidence. The first three were discovered by the Cassini probe in 2005; the Daphnean ridge was discovered in 2017. The ridge on Iapetus is nearly 20 km wide, 13 km high and 1300 km long. The ridge on Atlas is proportionally even more remarkable given the moon's much smaller size, giving it a disk-like shape. Images of Pan show a structure similar to that of Atlas, while the one on Daphnis is less pronounced.

== Triaxial ellipsoid ==
Small moons, asteroids, and comet nuclei frequently have irregular shapes. For some of these, such as Jupiter's Io, a scalene (triaxial) ellipsoid is a better fit than the oblate spheroid. For highly irregular bodies, the concept of a reference ellipsoid may have no useful value, so sometimes a spherical reference is used instead and points identified by planetocentric latitude and longitude. Even that can be problematic for non-convex bodies, such as Eros, in that latitude and longitude don't always uniquely identify a single surface location.

Smaller bodies (Io, Mimas, etc.) tend to be better approximated by triaxial ellipsoids; however, triaxial ellipsoids would render many computations more complicated, especially those related to map projections. Many projections would lose their elegant and popular properties. For this reason spherical reference surfaces are frequently used in mapping programs.

== See also ==
- Apparent longitude
- Areography (geography of Mars)
- Astronomical coordinate systems
- List of tallest mountains in the Solar System
- Planetary cartography
- Planetary surface
- Topography of Mars
- Selenography (Topography of the Moon)
