= Planetary surface =

Apollo 11 astronaut Buzz Aldrin walking on the surface of the Moon, which consists of lunar regolith (photographed by Neil Armstrong, July 1969).

OSIRIS-REx collecting a surface sample from asteroid 101955 Bennu in 2020 — (Full-sized image)

A planetary surface is where the solid or liquid material of certain types of astronomical objects contacts the atmosphere or outer space. Planetary surfaces are found on solid objects of planetary mass, including terrestrial planets (including Earth), dwarf planets, natural satellites, planetesimals and many other small Solar System bodies (SSSBs). The study of planetary surfaces is a field of planetary geology known as surface geology, but also a focus on a number of fields including planetary cartography, topography, geomorphology, atmospheric sciences, and astronomy. Land (or ground) is the term given to non-liquid planetary surfaces. The term landing is used to describe the collision of an object with a planetary surface and is usually at a velocity in which the object can remain intact and remain attached.

In differentiated bodies, the surface is where the crust meets the planetary boundary layer. Anything below this is regarded as being sub-surface or sub-marine. Most bodies more massive than super-Earths, including stars and giant planets, as well as smaller gas dwarfs, transition contiguously between phases, including gas, liquid, and solid. As such, they are generally regarded as lacking surfaces.

Planetary surfaces and surface life are of particular interest to humans as it is the primary habitat of the species, which has evolved to move over land and breathe air. Human space exploration and space colonization therefore focuses heavily on them. Humans have only directly explored the surface of Earth and the Moon. The vast distances and complexities of space makes direct exploration of even near-Earth objects dangerous and expensive. As such, all other exploration has been indirect via space probes.

Indirect observations by flyby or orbit currently provide insufficient information to confirm the composition and properties of planetary surfaces. Much of what is known is from the use of techniques such as astronomical spectroscopy and sample return. Lander spacecraft have explored the surfaces of planets Mars and Venus. Mars is the only other planet to have had its surface explored by a mobile surface probe (rover). Titan is the only non-planetary object of planetary mass to have been explored by lander. Landers have explored several smaller bodies including 433 Eros (2001), 25143 Itokawa (2005), Tempel 1 (2005), 67P/Churyumov–Gerasimenko (2014), 162173 Ryugu (2018) and 101955 Bennu (2020). Surface samples have been collected from the Moon (returned 1969), 25143 Itokawa (returned 2010), 162173 Ryugu and 101955 Bennu.

== Distribution and conditions ==
Planetary surfaces are found throughout the Solar System, from the inner terrestrial planets, to the asteroid belt, the natural satellites of the giant planets and beyond to the Trans-Neptunian objects. Surface conditions, temperatures and terrain vary significantly due to a number of factors including Albedo often generated by the surfaces itself. Measures of surface conditions include surface area, surface gravity, surface temperature and surface pressure. Surface stability may be affected by erosion through Aeolian processes, hydrology, subduction, volcanism, sediment or seismic activity. Some surfaces are dynamic while others remain unchanged for millions of years.

== Exploration ==
First self-propelled flying extraterrestrial probe Ingenuity on Mars, hovering over its surface and being watched by its parent rover Perseverance rover.

Distance, gravity, atmospheric conditions (extremely low or extremely high atmospheric pressure) and unknown factors make exploration both costly and risky. This necessitates the space probes for early exploration of planetary surfaces. Many probes are stationary have a limited study range and generally survive on extraterrestrial surfaces for a short period, however mobile probes (rovers) have surveyed larger surface areas. Sample return missions allow scientist to study extraterrestrial surface materials on Earth without having to send a crewed mission, however is generally only feasible for objects with low gravity and atmosphere.

=== Past missions ===
The first extraterrestrial planetary surface to be explored was the lunar surface by Luna 2 in 1959. The first and only human exploration of an extraterrestrial surface was the Moon, the Apollo program included the first moonwalk on July 20, 1969, and successful return of extraterrestrial surface samples to Earth. Venera 7 was the first landing of a probe on another planet on December 15, 1970. Mars 3 "soft landed" and returned data from Mars on August 22, 1972, the first rover on Mars was Mars Pathfinder in 1997, the Mars Exploration Rover has been studying the surface of the red planet since 2004. NEAR Shoemaker was the first to soft land on an asteroid – 433 Eros in February 2001 while Hayabusa was the first to return samples from 25143 Itokawa on 13 June 2010. Huygens soft landed and returned data from Titan on January 14, 2005.

There have been many failed attempts, more recently Fobos-Grunt, a sample return mission aimed at exploring the surface of Phobos.

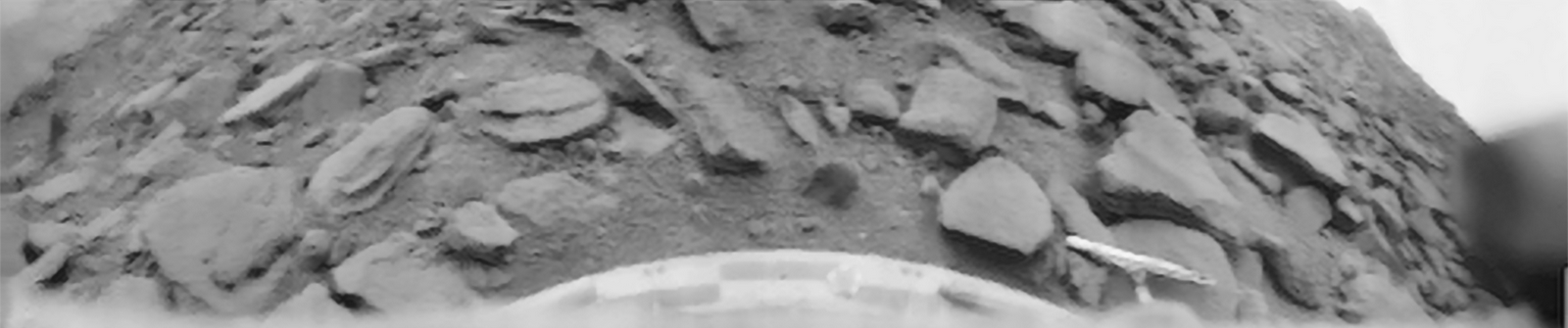
Venera 9 returned the first view and this first clear image from the surface of another planet in 1975 (Venus).

== Forms ==
The surfaces of Solar System objects, other than the four Outer Solar System giant planets, are mostly solid, with few having liquid surfaces.

In general terrestrial planets have either surfaces of ice, or surface crusts of rock or regolith, with distinct terrains. Water ice predominates surfaces in the Solar System beyond the frost line in the Outer Solar System, with a range of icy celestial bodies. Rock and regolith is common in the Inner Solar System until Mars.

The only Solar System object having a mostly liquid surface is Earth, with its global ocean surface comprising 70.8 % of Earth's surface, filling its oceanic basins and covering Earth's oceanic crust, making Earth an ocean world. The remaining part of its surface consists of rocky or organic carbon and silicon rich compounds.

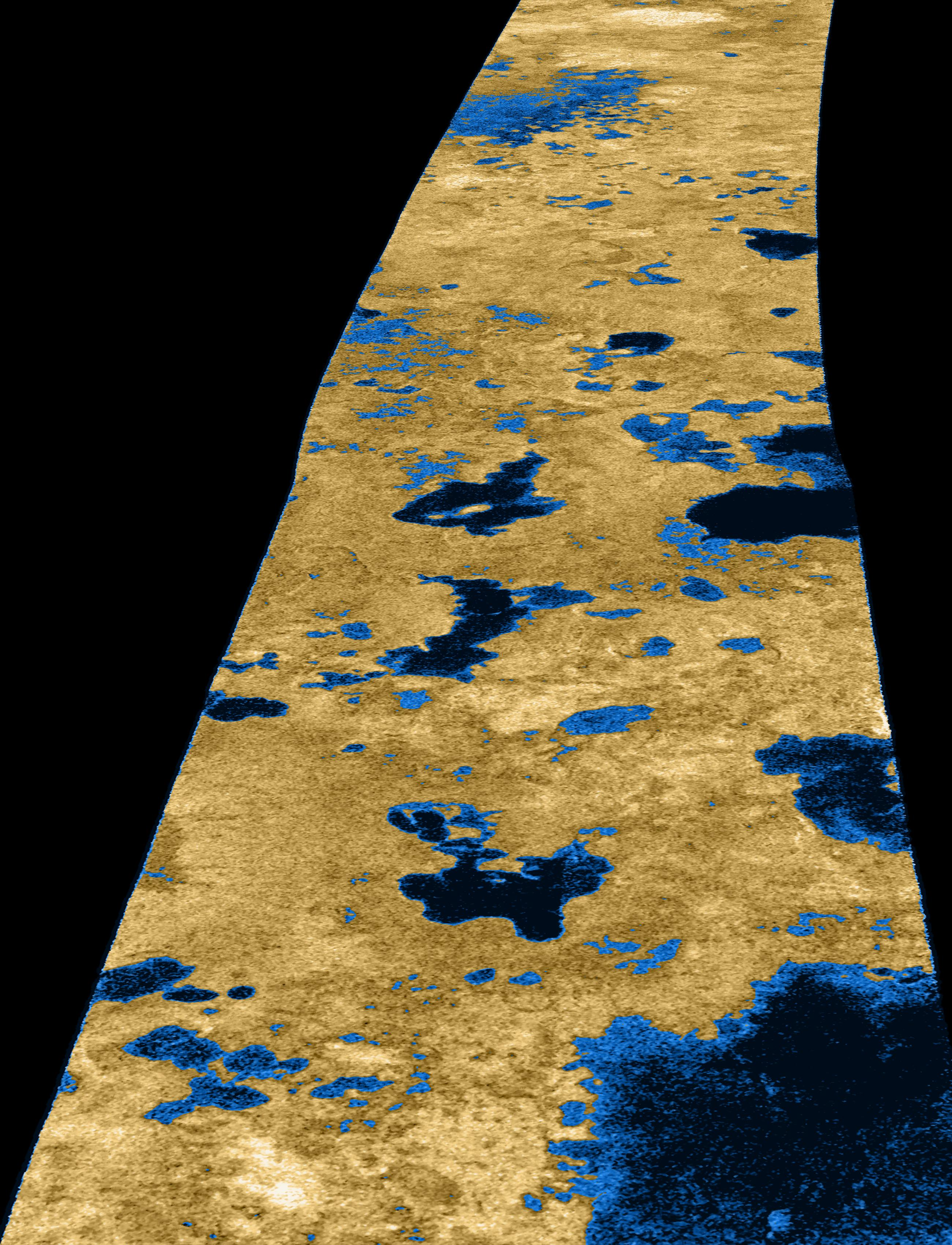
Perspective radar view of Titan's Bolsena Lacus (lower right) and other northern hemisphere hydrocarbon lakes

Liquid water as surface, beside on Earth, has only been found, as seasonal flows on warm Martian slopes, as well as past occurrences, and suspected at the habitable zones of other planetary systems. Surface liquid of any kind, has been found notably on Titan, having large methane lakes, some of which are the largest known lakes in the Solar System.

Volcanism can cause flows such as lava on the surface of geologically active bodies (the largest being the Amirani (volcano) flow on Io). Many of Earth's Igneous rocks are formed through processes rare elsewhere, such as the presence of volcanic magma and water. Surface mineral deposits such as olivine and hematite discovered on Mars by lunar rovers provide direct evidence of past stable water on the surface of Mars.

Apart from water, many other abundant surface materials are unique to Earth in the Solar System as they are not only organic but have formed due to the presence of life – these include carbonate hardgrounds, limestone, vegetation and artificial structures although the latter is present due to probe exploration (see also List of artificial objects on extra-terrestrial surfaces).

=== Extraterrestrial organic compounds ===
Increasingly, organic compounds are being found on objects throughout the Solar System. While unlikely to indicate the presence of extraterrestrial life, all known life is based on these compounds. Complex carbon molecules may form through various complex chemical interactions or delivered through impacts with small solar system objects and can combine to form the "building blocks" of carbon-based life. As organic compounds are often volatile, their persistence as a solid or liquid on a planetary surface is of scientific interest as it would indicate an intrinsic source (such as from the object's interior) or residue from larger quantities of organic material preserved through special circumstances over geological timescales, or an extrinsic source (such as from past or recent collision with other objects). Radiation makes the detection of organic matter difficult, making its detection on atmosphereless objects closer to the Sun extremely difficult.

Examples of likely occurrences include:

- Tholins – many Trans Neptunian Objects including Pluto-Charon, Titan, Triton, Eris, Sedna, 28978 Ixion, 90482 Orcus, 24 Themis
- Methane clathrate (CH_{4}·5.75H_{2}O) – Oberon, Titania, Umbriel, Pluto, 90482 Orcus, Comet 67P

==== On Mars ====
Martian exploration including samples taken by on the ground rovers and spectroscopy from orbiting satellites have revealed the presence of a number of complex organic molecules, some of which could be biosignatures in the search for life.

- Thiophene (C_{4}H_{4}S)
- Polythiophene (polymer of C_{4}H_{4}S)
- Methanethiol (CH_{3}SH)
- Dimethyl sulfide (CH_{2}S)

==== On Ceres ====
- Ammonium bicarbonate (NH_{4}HCO_{3}).
- Gilsonite

==== On Enceladus ====
- Methylamine/Ethylamine (CH_{3} NH_{2})
- Acetaldehyde (CH_{3} CHO)

==== On Comet 67P ====
The space probe Philae (spacecraft) discovered the following organic compounds on the surface of Comet 67P:.

- Acetamide (CH_{3}CONH_{2})
- Acetone (CH_{3})_{2}CO
- Methyl isocyanate (CH_{3}NCO)
- Propionaldehyde (CH_{3}CH_{2}CHO)

=== Inorganic materials ===
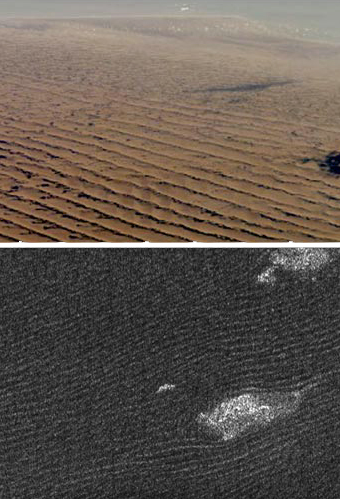
Sand dunes in the Namib Desert on Earth (top), compared with dunes in Belet on Titan

The following is a non-exhaustive list of surface materials that occur on more than one planetary surface along with their locations in order of distance from the Sun. Some have been detected by spectroscopy or direct imaging from orbit or flyby.

- Ice (H_{2}O) – Mercury (polar); Earth-Moon system; Mars (polar); Ceres and some asteroids such as 24 Themis; Jupiter moons – Europa, Ganymede and Callisto; Triton,; Saturn moons – Titan and Enceladus; Uranus moons – Miranda, Umbriel, Oberon; Kuiper belt objects including Pluto-Charon system, Haumea, 28978 Ixion, 90482 Orcus, 50000 Quaoar
- Silicate rock – Mercury, Venus, Earth, Mars, asteroids, Ganymede, Callisto, Moon, Triton
- Regolith – Mercury; Venus, Earth-Moon system; Mars (and its moons Phobos and Deimos); asteroids (including 4 Vesta); Titan
- Nitrogen ice (N) – Pluto–Charon, Triton, Kuiper belt objects, Plutinos
- Sulphur (S) – Mercury; Earth; Mars; Jupiter moons – Io and Europa

==== Rare inorganics ====
- Salts – Earth, Mars, Ceres, Europa and Jupiter Trojans, Enceladus
- Clays – Earth; Mars; asteroids including Ceres and Tempel 1; Europa
- Sand – Earth, Mars, Titan
- Calcium carbonate (CaCO_{3}) – Earth, Mars
- Sodium carbonate (Na_{2}CO_{3}) – Earth, Ceres

===== Carbon Ices =====
- Dry ice (CO_{2}) – Mars (polar); Ariel; Umbriel; Titania; Ganymede; Callisto
- Carbon monoxide ice (CO) - Triton

== Landforms ==
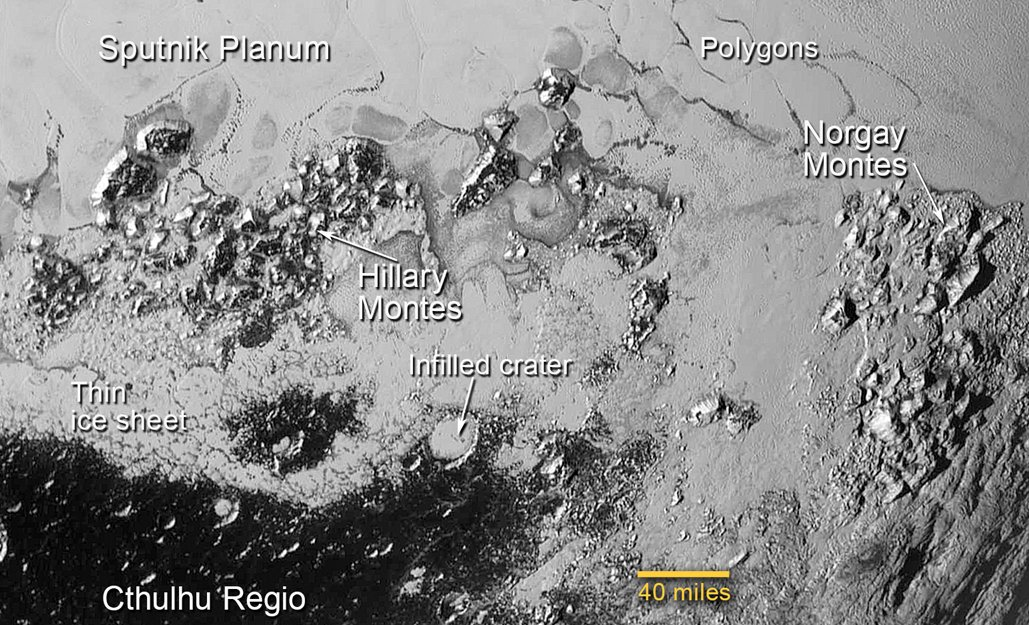
Pluto's Tombaugh Regio (photographed by New Horizons flyby on July 14, 2015) appears to exhibit geomorphological features previously thought to be unique to Earth.

Common rigid surface features include:

- Impact craters (though rarer on bodies with thick atmospheres, the largest being Hellas Planitia on Mars)
- Dunes as found on Venus, Earth, Mars and Titan
- volcanoes and cryovolcanoes
- Rilles
- Mountains (the highest being Rheasilvia on 4 Vesta)
- Escarpments
- Canyons and valleys (the largest being Valles Marineris on Mars)
- Caves
- Lava tubes, found on Venus, Earth, The Moon and Mars

== Surface of giant planets ==
Normally, giant planets are considered to not have a surface, although they might have a solid core of rock or various types of ice, or a liquid core of metallic hydrogen. However, the core, if it exists, does not include enough of the planet's mass to be actually considered a surface. Some scientists consider the point at which the atmospheric pressure is equal to 1 bar, equivalent to the atmospheric pressure at Earth's surface, to be the surface of the planet, if the planet has no clear rigid terrain. Therefore the location of the surface of terrestrial planets do not depend on an atmospheric pressure of 1 Bar, even if for example Venus has a thick atmosphere with pressures at Venus's surface increasing well above Earth's atmospheric pressure.

== Life ==
Planetary surfaces are investigated for the presence of past or present extraterrestrial life.

== Gallery ==
Some planetary surfaces of the Solar System and their compositions
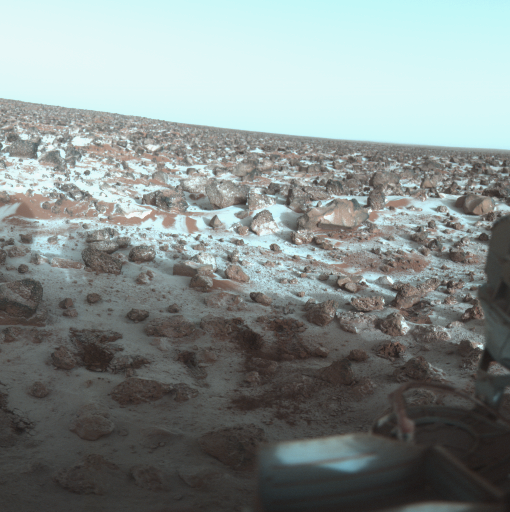
The dry, rocky and icy surface of planet Mars (photographed by Viking Lander 2, May 1979) is composed of iron-oxide rich regolith

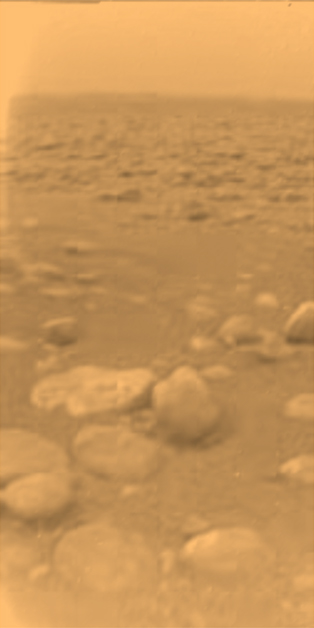
Pebbled plains of Saturn's moon Titan (photographed by Huygens probe, January 14, 2005) composed of heavily compressed states of water ice. This is the only ground-based photograph of an outer Solar System planetary surface

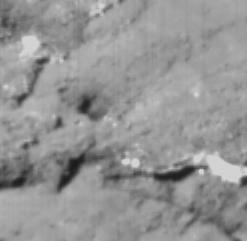
Surface of comet Tempel 1 (photographed by the Deep Impact probe), consists of a fine powder of contains water and carbon dioxide rich clays, carbonates, sodium, and crystalline silicates.

== See also ==
- Extraterrestrial atmosphere
- Hydrosphere
  - Subsurface ocean
  - Ocean world
- Planetary radius
- Planetary geoid
