= Committee on International Security and Arms Control =

The Committee on International Security and Arms Control (CISAC), created in 1980 by the United States National Academy of Sciences (NAS), supports the nation and the public with his best members on concerns of international security and arms control. The CISAC maintains dialogues with Russia (initiated in 1981), China (initiated in 1988) and India (initiated in 1999).
