= Planetary cartography =

Cartography of solid objects outside of the Earth

Planetary cartography, or cartography of extraterrestrial objects (CEO), is the cartography of solid objects outside of the Earth. Planetary maps can show any spatially mapped characteristic (such as topography, geology, and geophysical properties) for extraterrestrial surfaces. Some well-known examples of these maps have been produced by the USGS, such as the latest geological map of Mars, but many others are published in specialized scientific journals.

== Products ==
- Albedo map shows the measured difference in surface reflectivity from the surface of a celestial body.
- Atlas is a special collection of images of a celestial body surface. The images may be from either ground-based or spacecraft sources. Usually a single scale or set of scales is used throughout the atlas. Atlases can have specific themes (e.g., photographic, specialized to certain problems, thematic, etc.).
- Complex (integrated) atlas of groups of celestial bodies is a systematic collection of maps of a group of celestial bodies (e.g., the terrestrial planets, satellites of the gas-giant planets, etc.), giving a capability for the analysis of the collected information through comparative planetology.
- Geochemical map shows the distribution of chemical elements or minerals on the surface of a celestial body.
- Geological map is a graphic representation generalizing the geological history of the area covered by the map. A geological map includes information on the structure, distribution, age, and genetic type of rocks on the surface of the celestial body.
- Geologic/morphologic map shows the spatial distribution of geologic, geomorphologic, and tectonic features on a celestial body.
- Geomorphic map is a graphic representation of the distribution of surface morphological types portrayed in the landforms on a planetary body. Geomorphic maps do not attempt to infer the geologic history of the rocks themselves, but rather the processes that have generated the present surface features.
- Geophysical map shows a variety of geophysical information in a spatial representation (such as gravimetric, seismic, and magnetic anomaly maps).
- Globe is cartographic representation of the surface of a planetary body on a three-dimensional shape (which can be spherical or non-spherical, such as a tri-axial ellipsoid), preserving the geometric similarity of both locations and outlines features. Globes of spherical planets and irregular objects (e.g., the Martian moon Phobos, the asteroid Eros) have been produced from imaging and remote sensing data obtained from a variety of sources.
- Hypsometric map shows the macro-relief features on a planetary surface (for maps produced in Russia). The relief is represented by means of contours or isolines (to show areas at the same relative elevation), and color-coded contour intervals. In other countries, this term can also describe the distribution of elevations on the extraterrestrial object.
- Landing site map in planetary cartography is a graphic representation of the region surrounding the site where a spacecraft came to rest on a planetary surface (generally shown at large scale).
- Map in planetary cartography is a generalized image of the surface of an extraterrestrial solid body (excluding the Earth), that indicates the location of objects projected mathematically according to the adopted coordinate system used for the projection. Symbols can represent any subject, phenomena or process chosen by the cartographer to be illustrated on the map (a legend defining all symbols should be included to aid the map user). Maps of extraterrestrial territories represent all solar system bodies, with the exception of the Earth; they can be portrayed in a variety of forms, such as electronic (e.g., digital), conventional (printed), multilingual, orthophoto, drawing (e.g., shaded relief), outline, topographic (contoured), and thematic.
- Outline map in planetary cartography is a map representing relief with the help of outlines and special symbols. These maps are used as base-maps for thematic and schematic mapping, which allows the user to link visually a represented attribute with a relief feature on the surface.
- Physical properties map is a maps of various measured attributes of the extraterrestrial surface, such as albedo (see albedo, in this section), thermal anomalies (e.g., the distribution of hotspots on the Earth-facing hemisphere of the Moon), and polarimetric measurements.
- Synoptic map in planetary cartography is a graphic representation of attributes (e.g., pressure, temperature, etc.) that describe the weather above a planetary surface (e.g., a map of weather on Mars).
- Tectonic map in planetary cartography is a graphic representation of structural elements related to the tectonic history of the upper crust of a planetary body. The different structural areas and their separate elements (e.g., faults and folds) are shown by various symbols; when combined with a geological map, data regarding the age and type of rocks comprising the structural elements are given, along with their development in time.
- Thematic map in planetary cartography is a map showing the spatial representation of physical properties for a planetary surface (e.g., hypsometric, geophysical, geologic-morphologic, and geochemical maps).
- Terrain map in planetary cartography is a graphic representation of the distribution of boundaries between mapped regions on the planetary body, showing the presence or absence of characteristic details of a surface (e.g., impact craters, hills, faults, lava flows, aeolian cover, etc.). Such maps are usually produced by data obtained by remote sensing. See also geologic/morphologic map, photogeologic map.

== See also ==
- Areography (geography of Mars)
- Cartography of the Moon
- Planetary coordinate system

== Cartographic products ==
- Planetary Maps (The Planetary Cartography Working Group at the Cosmic Materials Space Research Group of Eötvös Loránd University)
- Geologic map of Mars (Published online in the USGS Publications Warehouse) https://doi.org/10.3133/sim3292
- Geologic map of the Terra Cimmeria-Nepenthes Mensae transitional zone, Mars – 1:1.45Million (Published online on June 29h, 2023 in the Journal of Maps) https://doi.org/10.1080/17445647.2023.2227205
