= Ruocco =

Ruocco is a surname. Notable people with the surname include:

- Carla Ruocco (born 1973), Italian politician
- Fernando Ruocco (born 1958), Uruguayan pole vaulter
- Frank J. Ruocco, director of the National Photographic Interpretation Center
- Joanna Ruocco, American author
- Joseph John Ruocco (1922–1980), American Roman Catholic bishop
- Lisa Ruocco, married to All Time Low lead singer Alex Gaskarth
- Mike Ruocco, American musician
- Ryan Ruocco (born 1986), American television and radio sportscaster
- Ettore Ruocco (1920–1944)
