= The Guns of John Moses Browning =

2021 non-fiction book by Nathan Gorenstein

The Guns of John Moses Browning: The Remarkable Story of the Inventor Whose Firearms Changed the World
- Front cover, depicting Browning with one of his designs, the M1918 Browning Automatic Rifle
- Author: Nathan Gorenstein
- Genre: Biography; Military history
- Published: May 25, 2021
- Publisher: Simon & Schuster
- Publication place: United States
- Pages: 320
- ISBN: 978-1-982129-21-7

The Guns of John Moses Browning: The Remarkable Story of the Inventor Whose Firearms Changed the World is a 2021 non-fiction book by Nathan Gorenstein about the life and career of American gunsmith John Browning.

== Overview ==
Written by former Philadelphia Inquirer author Nathan Gorenstein, The Guns of John Moses Browning details the events of John Browning's life, his inventions, and their historical impact. The book provides information on Browning's designs, as well as relevant aspects of his biography that impacted their creation. It is the first major biography to be published on John Browning.

== Reception ==
The Firearm Blog called the book "a breath of fresh air", praising the book for being able to cover a "multitude of information", and went on to suggest that though the book contains a lot of technical information, it was presented in such a way that it was easy to understand. Conversely, Kirkus Reviews felt that the technical information could alienate readers, and that the book was "best suited for gun enthusiasts", as they believed that "nonspecialists may get bogged down in such technical matters as the composition of a "locked breech system."" Publishers Weekly also noted that the excessive technical detail could "overwhelm general readers", but stated that Gorenstein was still able to emphasise Browning's abilities in a way that was nonetheless simple and understandable.

Lieutenant Colonel James C. King, writing for the Small Wars Journal, stated that "an understanding of the tools of war are not complete without an appreciation of the life of John Browning, an appreciation that cannot be truly had without Nathan Gorenstein’s book."
