= National Geospatial-Intelligence Agency =

US DoD division

- Seal of the NGA

- Flag of the NGA

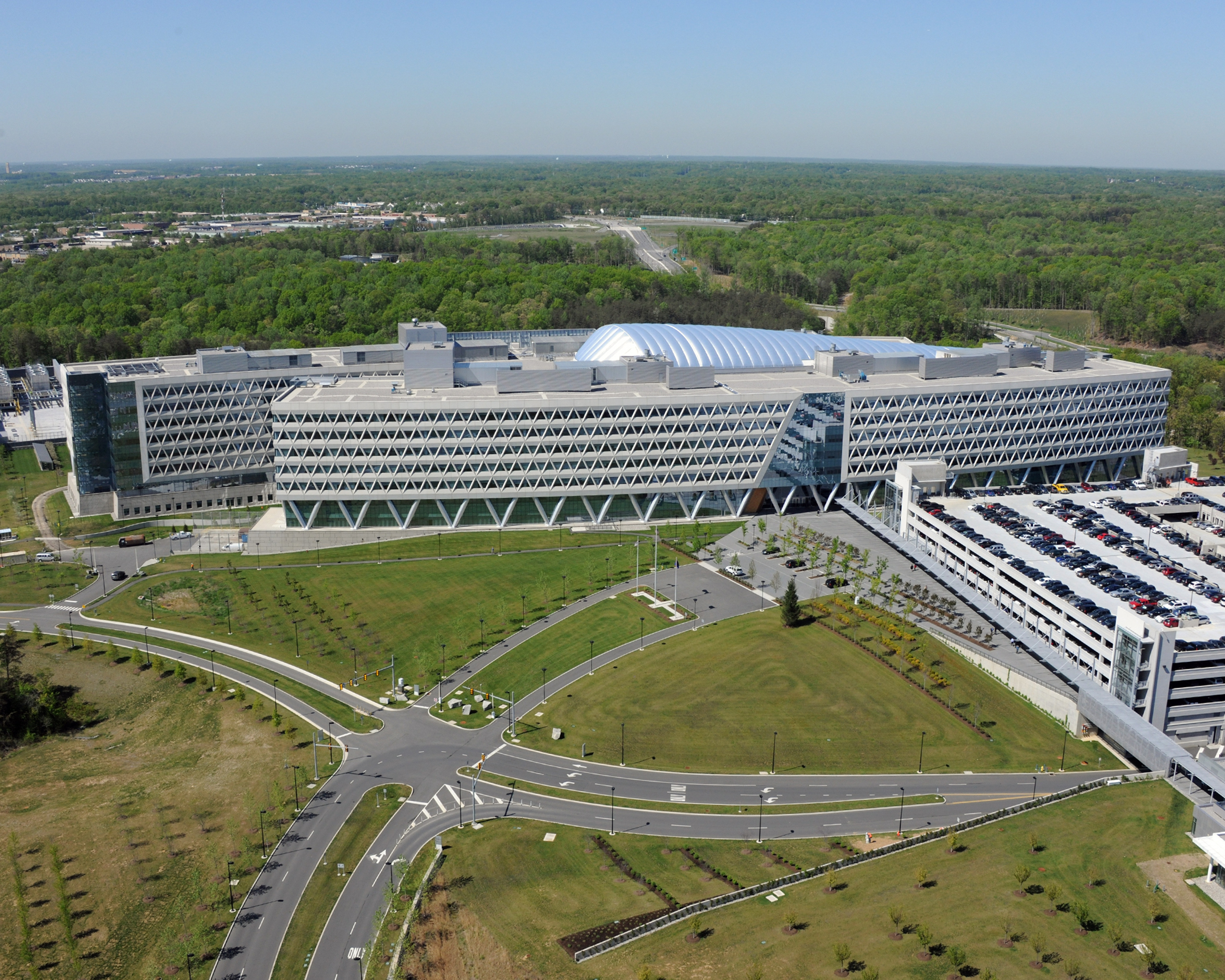
- NGA Campus East, headquarters of the agency

Agency overview
- Formed: October 1, 1996 (as the National Imagery and Mapping Agency)
- Preceding agency: Defense Mapping Agency, Central Imagery Office, and Defense Dissemination Program Office
- Headquarters: Fort Belvoir, Virginia, U.S.; 38.7532°N 77.1969°W
- Motto: "Know the Earth, Show the Way... from Seabed to Space"
- Employees: About 14,500
- Annual budget: Classified (at least $4.9 billion, as of 2013)
- Agency executives: Bradley Hansell, Under Secretary of Defense for Intelligence and Security; LTG Michele Bredenkamp, USA, Director; Brett Markham, Deputy Director; Rear Admiral Michael Baker, Associate Director for Operations
- Parent department: Department of Defense
- Website: nga.mil

The National Geospatial-Intelligence Agency (NGA) is a combat support agency within the United States Department of Defense whose primary mission is collecting, analyzing, and distributing geospatial intelligence (GEOINT) to support national security. Founded in 1996 as the National Imagery and Mapping Agency (NIMA), it changed names in 2003. It is a member of the United States Intelligence Community.

NGA headquarters, also known as NGA Campus East or NCE, is located at Fort Belvoir North Area in Springfield, Virginia. At 2,300,000 square feet (210,000 m^{2}), it is the third-largest government building in the Washington metropolitan area after the Pentagon and the Ronald Reagan Building. The agency also operates NGA Campus West, or NCW, in St. Louis, Missouri, and support and liaison offices worldwide.

NGA also helps respond to natural and manmade disasters, helps with security planning for major events such as the Olympic Games, disseminates maritime safety information, and gathers data on climate change.

The ninth and current director of the agency is Lieutenant General Michele Bredenkamp.

== History ==
U.S. mapping and charting efforts remained relatively unchanged until World War I, when aerial photography became a major contributor to battlefield intelligence. Using stereo viewers, photo-interpreters reviewed thousands of images. Many were of the same target at different angles and times, giving rise to modern imagery analysis and mapmaking.

=== Engineer Reproduction Plant (ERP) ===
The Engineer Reproduction Plant was the Army Corps of Engineers's first attempt to centralize mapping production, printing, and distribution. It was located on the grounds of the Army War College in Washington, D.C. Previously, topographic mapping had primarily been a function of individual field engineer units using field surveying techniques or copying existing or captured products. In addition, ERP assumed the "supervision and maintenance" of the War Department Map Collection, effective April 1, 1939.

=== Army Map Service (AMS) / U.S. Army Topographic Command (USATC) ===
With the advent of the Second World War aviation, field surveys began giving way to photogrammetry, photo interpretation, and geodesy. During wartime, compiling maps with minimal field work became increasingly possible. Out of this emerged AMS, which absorbed the existing ERP in May 1942. It was located at the Dalecarlia Site (including buildings now named for John C. Frémont and Charles H. Ruth) on MacArthur Blvd., just outside Washington, D.C., in Montgomery County, Maryland, and adjacent to the Dalecarlia Reservoir. AMS was designated as an Engineer field activity, effective July 1, 1942, by General Order 22, OCE, June 19, 1942. The Army Map Service also combined many of the Army's remaining geographic intelligence organizations and the Engineer Technical Intelligence Division. AMS was redesignated the U.S. Army Topographic Command (USATC) on September 1, 1968, and continued as an independent organization until 1972, when it was merged into the new Defense Mapping Agency (DMA) and redesignated as the DMA Topographic Center (DMATC) (see below).

=== Aeronautical Chart Plant (ACP) ===
After the war, the need for charts grew as airplane capacity and range improved. The Army Air Corps established its map unit, which was renamed ACP in 1943 and was located in St. Louis, Missouri. ACP was known as the U.S. Air Force Aeronautical Chart and Information Center (ACIC) from 1952 to 1972 (See DMAAC below).

=== National Photographic Interpretation Center (NPIC) ===
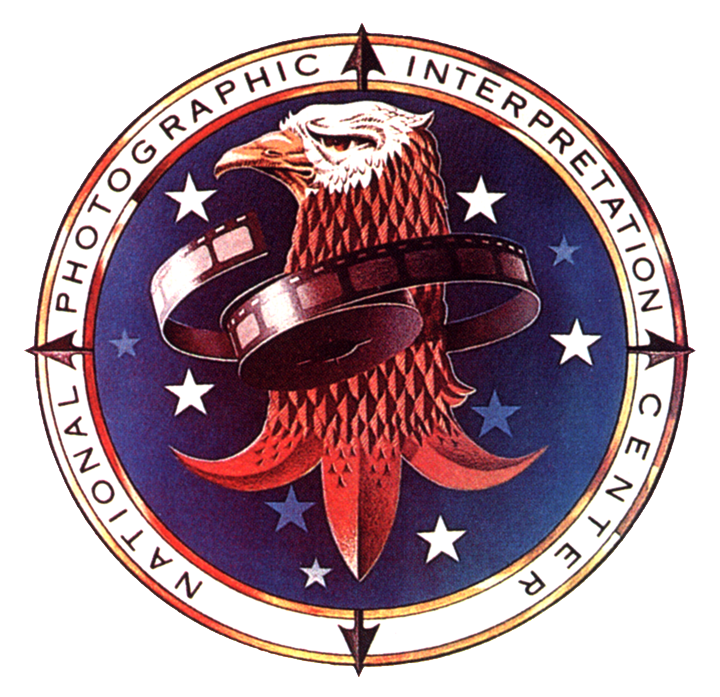
Seal of the National Photographic Interpretation Center (NPIC)

Shortly before leaving office in January 1961, President Dwight D. Eisenhower authorized the creation of the National Photographic Interpretation Center (NPIC), a joint project of the CIA and DIA. NPIC was a component of the CIA's Directorate of Science and Technology (DDS&T), and its primary function was imagery analysis. NPIC became part of the National Imagery and Mapping Agency (now NGA) in 1996.

Directors of NPIC

Director	Tenure
Arthur C. Lundahl	May 1953 – July 1973
John J. Hicks	July 1973 – May 1978
Rutledge P. Hazzard	June 1978 – February 1984
Robert M. Huffstutler	February 1984 – January 1988
Frank J. Ruocco	February 1988 – February 1991
Leo A. Hazlewood	February 1991 – September 1993
Nancy E. Bone	October 1993 – September 1996

==== Cuban Missile Crisis ====
In 1962, NPIC analysts discovered that the Soviet Union was basing missiles in Cuba. Using images from U-2 overflights and film from canisters ejected from Corona satellites, They informed U.S. policymakers and influenced operations during the Cuban Missile Crisis. Their analysis garnered worldwide attention when the Kennedy Administration declassified and made public a portion of the images depicting the Soviet missiles on Cuban soil; Adlai Stevenson presented the images to the United Nations Security Council on October 25, 1962.

=== Defense Mapping Agency (DMA) ===
The Defense Mapping Agency was created on January 1, 1972, to consolidate U.S. military mapping activities. DMA's "birth certificate", DoD Directive 5105.40, resulted from a formerly classified Presidential directive, "Organization and Management of the U.S. Foreign Intelligence Community" (November 5, 1971), which directed the consolidation of mapping functions previously dispersed among the military services. DMA became operational on July 1, 1972, pursuant to General Order 3, DMA (June 16, 1972). On October 1, 1996, DMA was folded into the National Imagery and Mapping Agency – which later became NGA.

DMA was first headquartered at the United States Naval Observatory in Washington, D.C., then at Falls Church, Virginia. Its mostly civilian workforce was concentrated at production sites in Bethesda, Maryland; Northern Virginia; and St. Louis, Missouri. DMA was formed from the Mapping, Charting, and Geodesy Division, Defense Intelligence Agency (DIA), and various mapping-related organizations of the military services.

DMA included the following centers:

DMA Hydrographic Center (DMAHC)
DMAHC was formed in 1972 when the Navy's Hydrographic Office split its two components: The charting component was attached to DMAHC, and the survey component moved to the Naval Oceanographic Office, Bay St. Louis, Mississippi, on the grounds of what is now the Stennis Space Center. DMAHC was responsible for creating terrestrial maps of coastal areas worldwide and hydrographic charts for DoD. DMAHC was initially located in Suitland, Maryland, but later moved to Brookmont (Bethesda), Maryland.
DMA Topographic Center (DMATC)
Located in the NGA's former headquarters in Brookmont, DMATC created topographic maps for DoD.
DMA Hydrographic/Topographic Center (DMAHTC)
DMAHC and DMATC eventually merged to form DMAHTC, with offices in Brookmont.
DMA Aerospace Center (DMAAC)
DMAAC originated with the U.S. Air Force's Aeronautical Chart and Information Center (ACIC) and was located in St. Louis.

=== National Imagery and Mapping Agency (NIMA) ===

NIMA's logo, seal, and flag

NIMA was established on October 1, 1996, by the National Defense Authorization Act for Fiscal Year 1997. The creation of NIMA followed more than a year of study, debate, and planning by the defense, intelligence, and policy-making communities (as well as the Congress) and continuing consultations with customer organizations. The creation of NIMA centralized responsibility for imagery and mapping.

NIMA combined the DMA, the Central Imagery Office (CIO), and the Defense Dissemination Program Office (DDPO) in their entirety, as well as the mission and functions of the NPIC. Also merged into NIMA were the imagery exploitation, dissemination, and processing elements of the Defense Intelligence Agency, National Reconnaissance Office, and the Defense Airborne Reconnaissance Office.

NIMA's creation was clouded by the natural reluctance of cultures to merge and the fear that their respective missions—mapping in support of defense activities versus intelligence production, principally in support of national policymakers—would be subordinated, each to the other.

=== National Geospatial-Intelligence Agency (NGA) ===
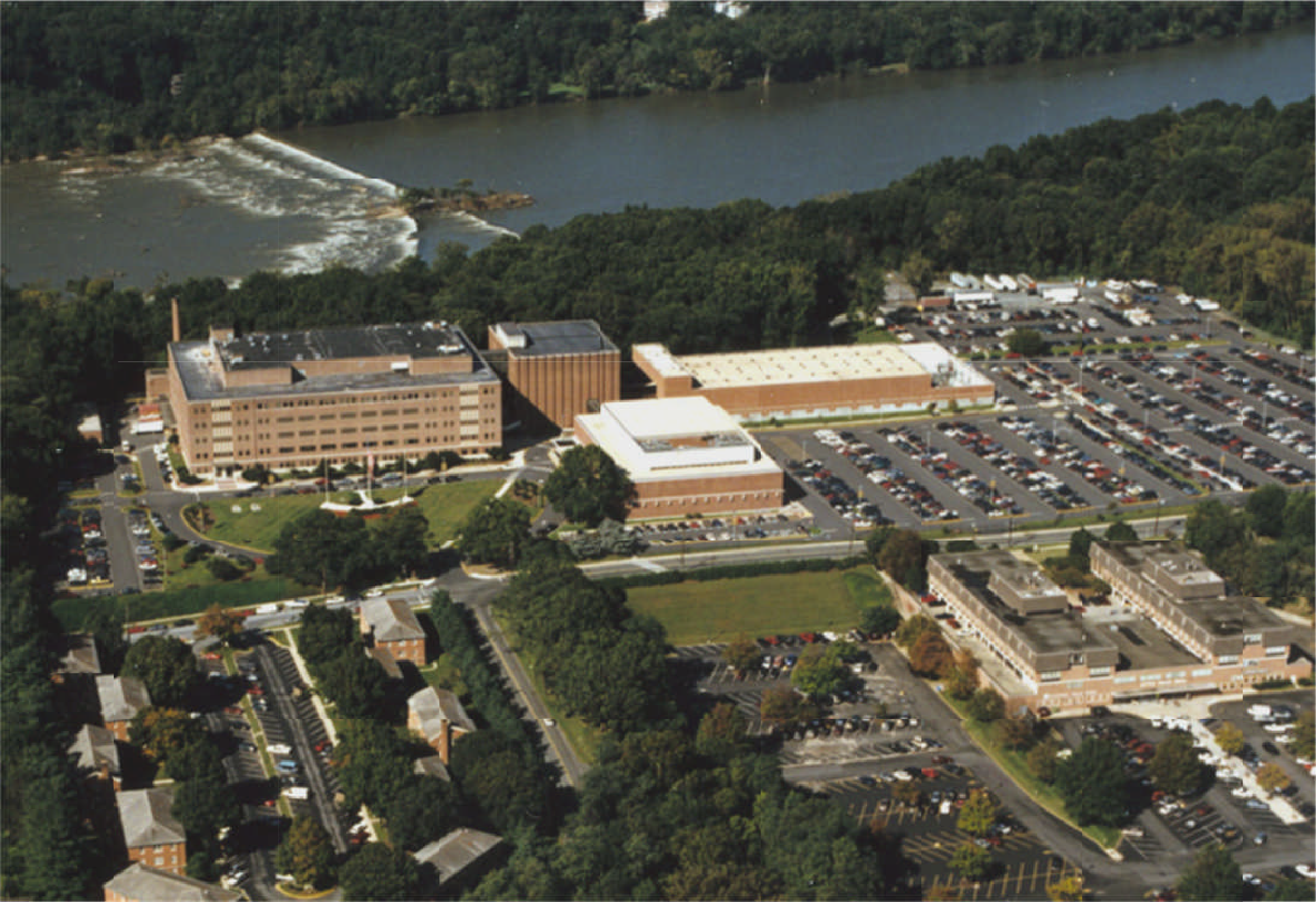
NGA's old headquarters in Brookmont, Maryland prior to 2012. It had been the headquarters of NGA and its predecessor agencies since 1945. After the move to its current headquarters, this facility was renovated and became Intelligence Community Campus-Bethesda.

With the enactment of the National Defense Authorization Act for Fiscal Year 2004 on November 24, 2003, NIMA was renamed National Geospatial-Intelligence Agency (NGA) to reflect better its primary mission in the area of GEOINT.

==== 2005 BRAC and effects on NGA ====
As a part of the 2005 Base Realignment and Closure (BRAC) process, all major Washington, D.C.–area NGA facilities, including those in Bethesda; Reston, Virginia; and Washington, D.C., were consolidated at a new facility at the former Engineer Proving Ground site near Fort Belvoir. This new facility, later known as NCE, houses several thousand people. NGA facilities in St. Louis were not affected by the 2005 BRAC process.

As of March 2009, the new center's cost was expected to be $2.4 billion. The center's campus is about 2,400,000 square feet (220,000 m^{2}) and was completed in September 2011.

==== Next NGA St. Louis ====
In September 2025, NGA opened a new facility in St. Louis, Missouri, Next NGA St. Louis, at a cost of $1.7 billion. The facility will hold 3,000 employees. St. Louis' city legislature is currently reconsidering legislation to surround Next NGA St. Louis with a protection zone that would bar certain businesses, such as gas stations, hazardous material companies, and foreign government-supported enterprises, from building around the site for security purposes.

== Organization ==
=== Agency structure ===
==== Executive leaders ====
A director heads NGA, currently Army Lieutenant General Michelle Bredenkamp Michele Bredenkamp; the director is followed in precedence by the deputy director and chief of staff, currently Brett Markham. The holders of these three offices comprise NGA's executive leadership team.

==== Chief of Staff ====
While NGA's director and deputy director oversee the agency, the Chief of Staff oversees NGA's executive support staff, administrative services, logistics, personnel security, human resources, employee training and development, corporate communications, and congressional engagement.

==== Directorates and directorate leaders ====
NGA is split into various directorates led by directors (D/XX) and associate deputy directors (ADD/XX), with "XX" standing in for each directorate's two-letter designation. Known directorates and leadership figures include but are not limited to the:

- Analysis Directorate, containing the Director of Analytic Operations (D/AO) and Associate Deputy Director for Operational Engagement (ADD/AE) and led by a director, currently Director of Analysis Susan "Sue" Kalweit
- Source Operations & Management Directorate (S or "Source" Directorate), led by the Director of the Source Operations & Management Directorate or Director of Source Operations
- Enterprise Operations Directorate (E or "Enterprise" Directorate), led by the Director of the Enterprise Operations Directorate
- IT Services Directorate
- Plans and Programs Directorate
- Research Directorate
- Security and Installation Operations Directorate (SI)
- Human Development Directorate (HD)
- Financial Management Directorate (FM)
- Unnamed "NGA contracting directorate"
- Acquisitions Directorate
- Unnamed "A Directorate" (possibly Acquisitions or Analysis)
- Unnamed "P Directorate" (possibly Plans and Programs or former Analysis and Production Directorate (see below))

An Analysis and Production Directorate (P or "Production" Directorate) existed in 2011, although NGA presently has a Directorate for Analysis, which may be a replacement or separated portion of the Analysis and Production Directorate.

The deputy associate director of operations directly oversees the NGA Operations Center (itself led by a director and deputy director) the Office of NGA Defense, the Office of Expeditionary Operations, and NGA leadership at the three National Reconnaissance Office Aerospace Data facilities.

==== Other internal groups and leaders ====
NGA contains NGA Support Teams (NST), which work with directorates, are detailed internationally, deploy with warfighters, or liaise with service branches. Multiple NGA Command NSTs also exist. NGA's western operations, such as constructing the Next NGA St. Louis campus in St. Louis, Missouri, is headed by the NGA St. Louis executive (who can concurrently serve in other leadership roles). There is also an NGA Equality Executive. Other organizations present in NGA, which may or may not be components of directorates, include:

- NGA Operations Center
- Office of Expeditionary Operations
- Office of NGA Defense (OND)
- Office of the Chief Information Officer (OCIO), led by NGA's chief information officer
- Office of the Inspector General (OIG), led by NGA's Inspector General (currently Cardell Richardson, Sr.)
- Records Service Office
- National Geospatial-Intelligence Committee (GEOCOM), containing subcommittees
- National Geospatial-Intelligence College (NGC), led by a director
- GEOINT Enterprise Office, led by a director and organized into branches
- Office of Geomatics
- Aeronautical Navigation Office
- Office of Corporate Assessment and Program Evaluation (CAPE)
- Office of Corporate Communications, led by a director
- Office of Strategic Operations-Performance
- NGA Cyber Security Operations Cell (CSOC), led by a director and organized into teams
- NGA Police
- NGA History Department
- Office of Maritime Safety
  - Bathymetry branch, led by a chief
- Office of Contract Services
- Office of Future Warfare Systems (MRF)
- Office of Diversity Management and Equal Employment Opportunity, led by a director
- Custom Media Team (XCMS), containing the Tailored Media support team and CMGS (Custom Media Generation System) team
- GPS Division
- Historical Imagery Division/Historical Imagery team
- Volunteered Geographic Information (VGI) Team, community-led by NGA containing screened non-NGA users/institutions
- Office of Ventures and Innovation
- NGA Research, led by a director
- Enterprise Innovation Office (EIO)
- Office of Strategic Operations
- Office of Geography
- NGA Outpost Valley (NOV), office of NGA in Silicon Valley
- Office of Congressional and Intergovernmental Affairs
- Personnel Security Division, led by a chief
- Meteorological Operations Center
- Office of General Counsel (OGC)
- Records and Declassification Program Office
- FOIA/Privacy Act Program Office

Additionally, military Service GEOINT Offices (SGOs) liaise with NGA but belong to their respective military service branches and represent their geospatial intelligence needs. The Canadian Armed Forces deploys a liaison team to NGA; that team's operations officer also acts as NGA's Commonwealth liaison.

NGA is a member of the National System for Geospatial Intelligence (NSG) and the more extensive Allied System for Geospatial Intelligence (ASG), which includes close allies Canada, the United Kingdom, Australia, and New Zealand. The U.S. and those four nations also form the Five Eyes intelligence alliance.

=== Employees ===
NGA employs professionals in aeronautical analysis, cartography, geospatial analysis, imagery analysis, marine analysis, the physical sciences, geodesy, computer and telecommunication engineering, and photogrammetry, as well as those in the national security and law enforcement fields.

=== List of NIMA / NGA directors ===
This table lists all directors of the NIMA and NGA and their terms of office. The agency transitioned from NIMA to NGA during Lieutenant General King's directorship.

No.	Director		Term		
No.	Portrait	Name	Took office	Left office	Term length
1	Joseph J. Dantone	Rear Admiral; Joseph J. Dantone; Acting	c. October 1996	March 1998	c. 1 year, 151 days
2	James C. King	Lieutenant General; James C. King	March 1998	September 2001	c. 3 years, 184 days
3	James Clapper	James Clapper	September 2001	c. July 7, 2006	c. 4 years, 309 days
4	Robert B. Murrett	Vice Admiral; Robert B. Murrett	c. July 7, 2006	August 2010	c. 4 years, 25 days
5	Letitia Long	Letitia Long	August 2010	October 3, 2014	c. 4 years, 63 days
6	Robert Cardillo	Robert Cardillo	October 3, 2014	February 7, 2019	4 years, 127 days
7	Robert D. Sharp	Vice Admiral; Robert D. Sharp	February 7, 2019	June 3, 2022	3 years, 116 days
8	Frank D. Whitworth III	Vice Admiral; Frank D. Whitworth III	June 3, 2022	November 5, 2025	3 years, 155 days
9	Michele Bredenkamp	Lieutenant General; Michele Bredenkamp	November 5, 2025	Incumbent	1 year, 12 days

- † - Although General Clapper preferred the use of his military rank, he was, in fact, a member of the Defense Intelligence Senior Executive Service (DISES) during his term as Director of NGA, as he had retired from active duty as the director of Defense Intelligence Agency in 1995. Clapper was the first civilian to head NIMA / NGA.

== Civilian, Department of Defense, and intelligence community activities ==
- Osama bin Laden compound raid: NGA was integral in helping the Department of Defense and the U.S. Intelligence Community pinpoint the compound in Abbottabad, Pakistan where Osama bin Laden hid for several years and to plan the raid that killed him.
- 9/11 aftermath: After the September 11, 2001 attacks, NIMA partnered with the U.S. Geological Survey to survey the World Trade Center site and determine the extent of the destruction.
- Keyhole investment: NGA contributed approximately 25% of In-Q-Tel's funding of Keyhole Inc, whose Earth-viewing software became Google Earth.
- Hurricane Katrina: NGA supported Hurricane Katrina relief efforts by "providing geospatial information about the affected areas based on imagery from commercial and U.S. government satellites, and from airborne platforms, to the Federal Emergency Management Agency (FEMA) and other government agencies. NGA's Earth website is a central source of these efforts.
- Microsoft partnership: Microsoft Corp. and NGA have signed a letter of understanding to advance the design and delivery of geospatial information applications to customers. NGA will continue to use the Microsoft Virtual Earth platform (as it did for Katrina relief) to provide geospatial support for humanitarian, peacekeeping, and national-security efforts. Virtual Earth is a set of online mapping and search services that deliver imagery through an API.
- Google and GeoEye: In 2008, NGA partnered with Google and GeoEye. Google would be allowed to use GeoEye spy satellite imagery with reduced resolution for Google Earth.
- Open source software on GitHub: April 2014 NGA became the first intelligence agency to open-source software on GitHub. NGA Director Letitia Long talks about NGA's GitHub initiative and the first offering, GeoQ, at the GEOINT Symposium. Her comments start at 40 minutes and 40 seconds from her GEOINT 2014 conference speech. NGA open sources software packages under their GitHub organizational account.
- After the 2019 creation of the United States Space Force, NGA began working with the USSF "to provide geospatial intelligence to support and identify future needs of the service", establishing a new support team (NST) embedded at USSF headquarters.
- In 2022, NGA aided in rescue and recovery from Hurricane Ian in Florida.
- Since 2022, NGA has provided unclassified imagery capabilities to the Conflict Observatory to capture and analyze evidence of Russian war crimes in Ukraine.

== Controversies ==
NIMA / NGA has been involved in several controversies.

- India tested a nuclear weapon in 1998 that reportedly took the United States by surprise. Due to budget cuts in defense spending after the end of the Cold War (see Peace dividend), the intelligence community was forced to reevaluate the allocation of its limited resources.
- In 1999, NIMA reportedly provided NATO war planners with incorrect maps that did not reflect that the Chinese Embassy in Belgrade had moved locations, which some have argued was the cause of the accidental NATO bombing of the Chinese embassy in Belgrade. The Central Intelligence Agency countered this criticism by saying this overstates the importance of the map itself in the analytic process. Maps of urban areas will be out-of-date the day after they are published, but what is important is having accurate databases.
- On Jan. 17, 2013, USS Guardian, a mine countermeasures ship, was grounded on the Tubbataha Reef in the southern Philippines. While it was determined that the NGA had provided an inaccurate chart that was off by as much as 8 nautical miles (15 km; 9.2 mi), the Navy primarily faulted the ship's crew, specifically the commanding officer, the executive officer and two junior officers that were standing watch at the time of the grounding, as they had failed to adhere to prudent, safe, and sound navigation principles. The crew relied solely on the inaccurate Digital Nautical Chart (DNC) during the planning and execution of the navigation plan and failed to appropriately cross-reference additional charts and utilize visual cues.
- From 2013 to 2018, NGA designated the latitude and longitude coordinates of a private residence as a default location for Pretoria, South Africa, causing the digital-mapping website MaxMind to set it as the location of over one million IP addresses, which in turn caused people searching for missing phones and other electronics (as well as other people trying to track down IP addresses in Pretoria and police officers attempting to track criminals) to show up at the residence. The issue was eventually resolved following a private investigation and a request to both NGA and MaxMind that the default location be changed.

== Gallery ==
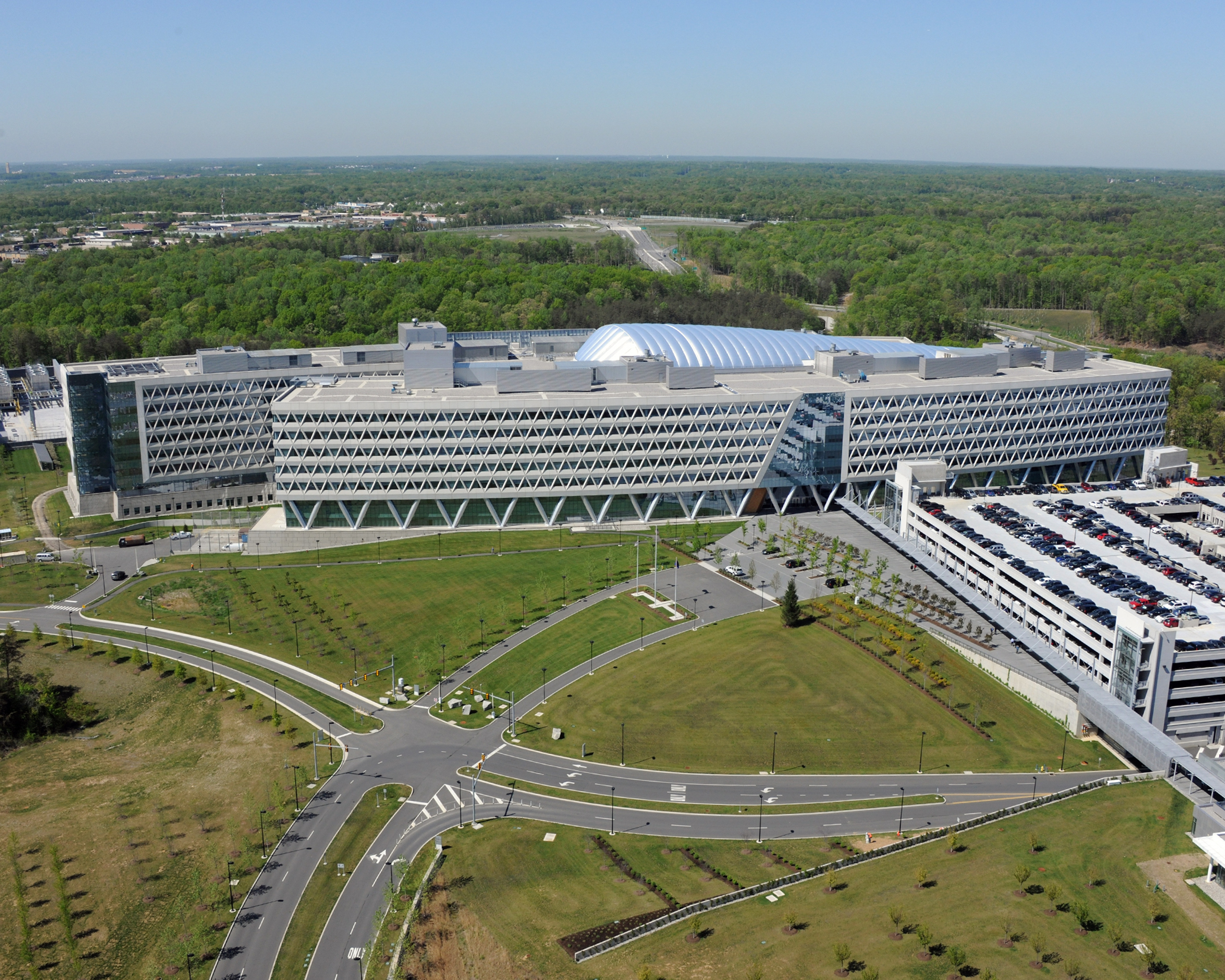
NGA headquarters

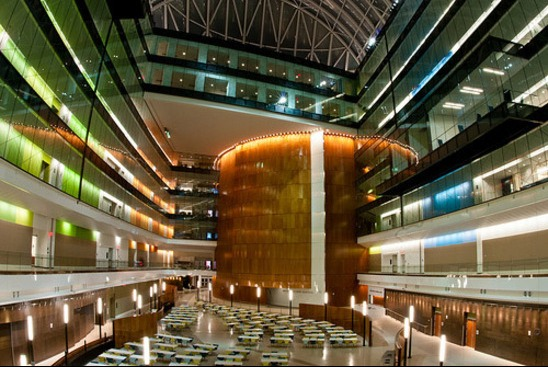
NGA headquarters' atrium

== See also ==
- Director of National Intelligence
- Cartography
- Geographic Information System (GIS)
- GEOnet Names Server
- Geospatial engineering
- GIS use in NGA
- Imagery intelligence (IMINT)
- Geospatial intelligence (GEOINT)
- Orthophoto
- Remote sensing
- Satellite imagery
- Small Sats
- TransApps
- Australian Geospatial-Intelligence Organisation, Australian counterpart
- Reference Elevation Model of Antarctica (REMA), supported by NGA.
