= Robert M. Huffstutler =

Former US intelligence service director

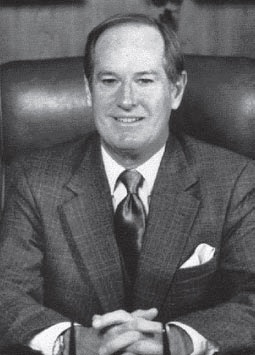
- Education: University of California, Berkeley (BA in Economics) (MA in International Economics)
- Occupation: Intelligence Officer

Robert M. Huffstutler was director of National Photographic Interpretation Center from February 1984 to January 1988.

At the time of his appointment as director of NPIC, Huffstutler was a twenty-five year veteran of Central Intelligence Agency, and head of the intelligence directorate's Office of Soviet Analysis. He had served in Office of Strategic Research from 1967 to 1982.

== Early life, and career ==
Huffstutler received a BA in economics and an MA in international economics from the University of California at Berkeley. He also attended the Institute for Defense Analysis, University of Maryland and at the Royal College of Defense Studies, London, England. After completing his graduate degree in 1958, he joined the CIA as an international economist. Within a few months he was reassigned to work as a military force analyst in the office that was later designated the Office of Strategic Research (OSR) in the Directorate of Intelligence.

== Career ==
In 1967, he was reassigned to the Strategic Defense Branch of OSR. From 1976 to 1978 he served as deputy director of the Office of Weapons Intelligence, and in late 1978 he became director of Strategic Research. In 1982, when the Directorate of Intelligence was reorganized, he became the director of Soviet Analysis.

During his tenure as director of NPIC (February 1984 to January 1988), Huffstutler transformed imagery analysis with a large technical modernization program. He established the National Exploitation Laboratory to enhance imagery exploitation, launched a product quality improvement program, and implemented a new personnel system. In early 1988 Huffstutler returned to the CIA as deputy director for Administration; four years later he was named executive director. He retired from the CIA in 1994.

== Accolades ==
- Huffstutler was twice awarded the National Intelligence Distinguished Service Medal and holds two of CIA's Distinguished Intelligence Medals.
- In April 2003 he was inducted into the National Imagery and Mapping Agency (NIMA) Hall of Fame, at which time he was cited for encouraging NPIC analysts to "push the threshold of imagery's contributions to tough intelligence issues."

Government offices
Preceded by Rutledge P. Hazzard	Director of the National Photographic Interpretation Center; February 1984 – January 1988	Succeeded by Frank J. Ruocco
