= Rutledge P. Hazzard =

U.S. Army officer, national intelligence official and imagery expert

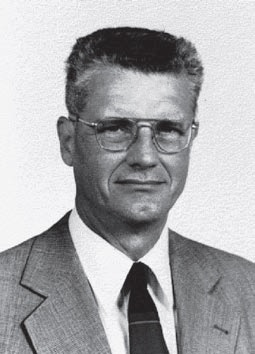
- Born: April 11, 1925; Birmingham, Alabama, U.S.
- Died: December 27, 2008 (aged 83); Alexandria, Virginia, U.S.
- Education: United States Military Academy; University of Southern California; Army Command and General Staff College; Industrial College of the Armed Forces; George Washington University; University of Pittsburgh
- Awards: Legion of Merit with two oak leaf clusters; Bronze Star Medal; Air Medal with oak leaf clusters; Army Commendation Medal; Distinguished Service Medal; National Intelligence Service Medal; Distinguished Intelligence Medal, CIA; Inductee of NGA Hall of Fame (2002)
- Espionage activity
- Allegiance: United States
- Service branch: National Photographic Interpretation Center; Central Intelligence Agency; United States Army
- Rank: Brigadier general

Rutledge Parker "Hap" Hazzard (April 11, 1925 – December 27, 2008) was director of Science and Technology division of Central Intelligence Agency (CIA) from 1973 to 1978. He became director of the National Photographic Interpretation Center (NPIC) in 1978. After serving six years as director of NPIC from June 1978 to February 1984, Hazzard returned to the CIA's National Intelligence Office. He retired from public service in 1985.

Hazzard modernized the National Photographic Interpretation Center with new tools during a period of shifting imagery collection. As director of NPIC, a heritage organization of the National Geospatial-Intelligence Agency, he managed the agency’s leadership, energy, and foreign missile systems analysis.

== Early life, and education ==
Rutledge Hazzard was born in Birmingham, Alabama. He graduated from the U.S. Military Academy in 1946. He attended the Officers Advanced Course at Artillery and Guided Missile School in 1953–54. Hazzard received an MS in mechanical engineering from the University of Southern California in 1956. He completed the Army Command and General Staff College in 1960 and the Industrial College of the Armed Forces in 1965.

Hazzard received an MBA from The George Washington University in 1965 and in 1968 completed an Advanced Management Program at the University of Pittsburgh.

== Career ==
Following basic branch training, Brigadier General Hazzard served with the 16th Constabulary Squadron (Separate) in Berlin, Germany, as part of the occupation and, in 1948–49, in support of the Berlin Airlift. Beginning in July 1950 he served at the U.S. Military Academy as an instructor in the Department of Military Topography and Graphics.

From 1956 to 1959 he participated in ballistic missile development at Redstone Arsenal, Alabama. At the Army Ballistic Missile Agency, he worked on the development of the Redstone, and Jupiter ballistic missiles and in the Jupiter C program. Subsequently, as executive officer for the Research and Development Division of the Army Ordnance Missile Command, he participated in the planning and analysis of what became the Saturn I crewed space flight program.

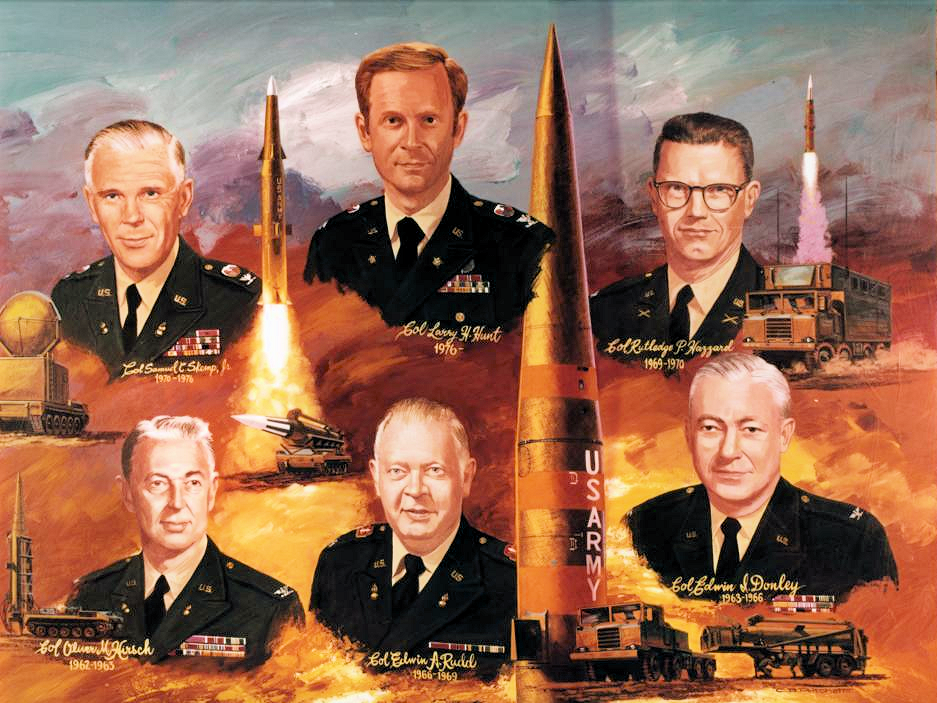
Clockwise: Col. Samuel C. Skemp, Jr., Col. Larry H. Hunt, Col. Rutledge P. Hazzard, Col. Oliver M. Hirsch, Col. Edwin A. Rudd and Col. Edwin L. Donley

He served in the Scientific and Technical Division of the Office of the Assistant Chief of Staff of Intelligence in the Department of the Army at Washington, D.C. Brigadier General Hazzard served in Korea from 1963 to 1964 as commanding officer of the 7th Battalion, 5th Artillery (Hawk). Returning to Washington in 1965, he served as an Army member of the Strategic Nuclear Branch of the Chairman's Special Studies Group of the Joint Chiefs of Staff in the Pentagon until 1968, when he became executive officer of I Field Force Artillery, Vietnam. From December 1968 to May 1969, he commanded the 52d Artillery Group with headquarters at Pleiku, Vietnam. From July 1969 to 1971, he returned to Redstone Arsenal, Alabama, as project manager of the Pershing and Lance weapon systems. He then served at Headquarters, Safeguard Systems Command, until his retirement from active duty in 1973.

After leaving the U.S. Army, Brigadier General Hazzard joined the Central Intelligence Agency (CIA) as director of Science and Technology. After six years as director of the National Photographic Interpretation Center (NPIC), Brigadier General Hazzard returned to the CIA's National Intelligence Office. He retired from public service in 1985.

== Death ==
Hazzard died on December 27, 2008, in Alexandria, Virginia due to lung cancer. He was 83 years old at the time of death.

== Accolades ==
Brigadier General Hazzard was inducted into the NGA Hall of Fame in 2002. Hazzard received the following accolades:

- Legion of Merit with two oak leaf clusters
- Bronze Star Medal
- Air Medal with oak leaf clusters
- Army Commendation Medal
- Distinguished Service Medal, from CIA
- National Intelligence Service Medal

Government offices
Preceded by John J. Hicks	Director of the National Photographic Interpretation Center; June 1978 – February 1984	Succeeded by Robert M. Huffstutler
