= Leo A. Hazlewood =

Imagery and mapping

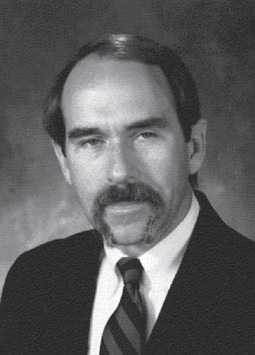
- Official portrait of Leo Hazlewood
- Allegiance: United States of America
- Branch: Central Intelligence Agency; National Imagery and Mapping Agency

Leo A. Hazlewood was Director of National Photographic Interpretation Center from February 1991 – September 1993), and Deputy Director of National Imagery and Mapping Agency from July 1997 – January 2000. He also served as Deputy Director of Operations at National Imagery and Mapping Agency (October 1996 – July 1997).

== Biography ==
Leo Hazlewood earned a BA in government from Georgetown University in 1965, an MA in political science from the University of Illinois at Urbana in 1966, and a PhD in political science from the University of Pennsylvania in 1969. Hazlewood taught political science and government at the University of Pennsylvania and at Florida State University between 1969 and 1974. From 1975 to 1977 he worked for CACI Inc., in Arlington, Virginia.

In 1977 he joined the Central Intelligence Agency (CIA) as a senior economist. Between March 1991 and September 1993, Hazlewood served as director of the National Photographic Interpretation Center. He then served as executive director of the CIA, functioning as the agency’s chief operating officer responsible for the direction and oversight of information collection and analysis worldwide. In 1995 he became deputy director for Administration, managing the CIA’s largest business sector, charged with all facets of corporate support—finance, procurement, material management, facilities, security, human resources, training, communications, and information technology.

In early December 1995, he was selected to become first deputy director of the implementation team for the establishment of the National Imagery and Mapping Agency (NIMA). In that position, he was responsible for attempting to unify NGA’s capabilities in imagery, imagery intelligence and geospatial information, and consolidation of resources from eight different agencies into the newly found NIMA, under directorship of Joseph J. Dantone.

In January 2000 Hazlewood retired from the federal government. In March 2000, Hazlewood joined Science Applications International Corporation (SAIC) as a corporate vice president and director for intelligence programs in the space, intelligence, and information sector. In 2001 he was inducted into the NIMA Hall of Fame. Since February 2004, he has been the senior vice president and general manager of the Mission Integration Business Unit in SAIC’s Intelligence, Security, and Technology Group.

Government offices
Preceded by Frank J. Ruocco	Acting Director of the National Imagery and Mapping Agency; February 1991 – September 1993	Succeeded by Nancy E. Bone
