= Joseph J. Dantone =

Former senior officer in the U.S. Navy

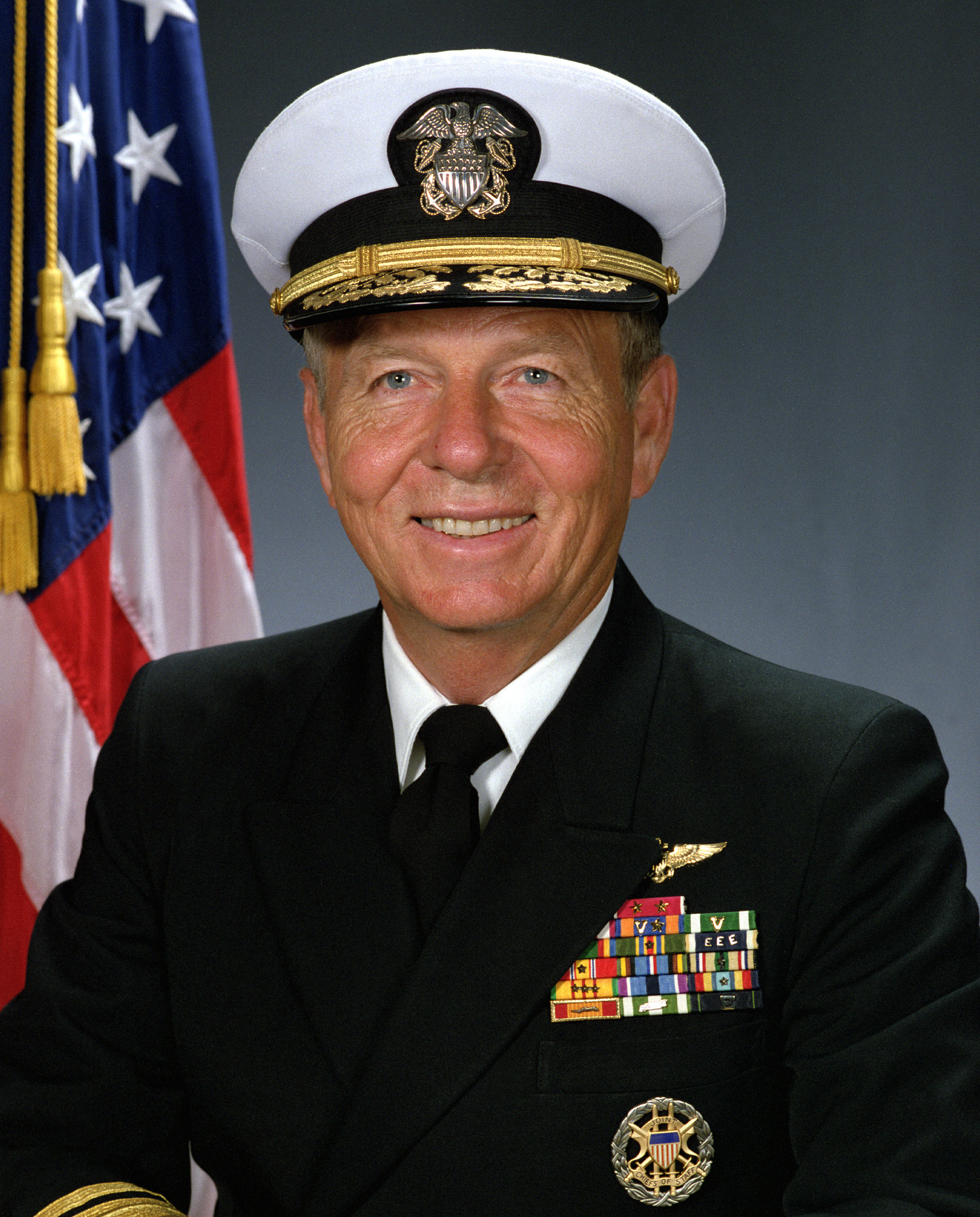
- Official portrait of Joseph J. Dantone
- Born: 6 August 1942 (age 83); Baltimore, Maryland, U.S.
- Allegiance: United States of America
- Branch: United States Navy
- Rank: Rear Admiral
- Commands: Carrier Group Three; USS Dwight D. Eisenhower; PCU Abraham Lincoln; USS Wichita; VF-14
- Conflicts: Vietnam; Gulf War

Rear Admiral Joseph John "Jack" Dantone Jr. (born 6 August 1942) was the last director of the U.S. Navys Defense Mapping Agency (DMA), from May 1996 to September 1996. He was also the Acting Director of National Imagery and Mapping Agency (NIMA) from October 1996 to March 1998. He played a major role in transition of DMA into NIMA.

== Early life and education ==
Born in Baltimore, Maryland, United States, on 6 August 1942, Dantone graduated from the United States Naval Academy with a B.S. degree in Naval Engineering in 1964. Commissioned as an ensign and assigned to flight training, he was designated a naval aviator on 24 September 1965. Dantone later earned M.S. degrees in Aeronautical Engineering and Management at the Naval Postgraduate School. He received eighteen months of nuclear power training in 1981 and 1982.

== Naval career ==
After completing flight training, Dantone was assigned to VF-84 flying the F-4 Phantom from the carrier Independence in the Mediterranean Sea. Transferred to VF-161, he next flew from the carrier Coral Sea in Southeast Asia during the Vietnam War.

After completing his studies at the Naval Postgraduate School, Dantone was assigned to fly the F-14 Tomcat. Deployed with VF-1 aboard the carrier Enterprise, he flew fighter cover during the evacuation of Saigon in early 1975. In July 1977, Dantone joined VF-14 flying from the carrier John F. Kennedy. On 7 April 1978, he became executive officer of the squadron. Dantone assumed command of the squadron on 6 July 1979, serving until 22 December 1980.

After completing his nuclear power training, Dantone served as executive officer of Enterprise from January 1983 to February 1985. He was next given command of the replenishment oiler Wichita from 10 December 1985 to 12 March 1987. Assigned as the commanding officer of PCU Abraham Lincoln in November 1987, Dantone was reassigned before the new carrier could be commissioned. He was instead given command of the carrier Dwight D. Eisenhower on 27 September 1988, serving until 28 September 1990. She was deployed to the Red Sea during the Gulf War before Dantone left her in December 1990.

Promoted to rear admiral, Dantone served as the commanding officer of Carrier Group Three from April 1992 to March 1994.

== Defense Mapping Agency ==
Rear Admiral Dantone led the NIMA transition team that established the mission, function, organizational structure and program plan for the new agency. He led the consolidation of resources from eight different agencies into the new agency after gaining the approval of Department of Defense, the intelligence community, and various oversight congressional committees.

On 28 November 1995, the Secretary of Defense, Director of Central Intelligence and Chairman, Joint Chiefs of Staff sent a joint letter to Congressional leaders and appropriate committees agreeing in concept to the establishment of a National Imagery and Mapping Agency (NIMA). The purpose of NIMA was to consolidate imagery and mapping resources and management, from eight different agencies, into a single agency within the Department of Defense (DoD) to improve the overall effectiveness and efficiency of imagery intelligence and mapping support to both national and military customers.

Dantone, then Deputy Director for Military Support, National Reconnaissance Office, was named Director of NIMA Implementation Team, and acting director of NIMA. Leo A. Hazlewood, then Deputy Director for Administration, Central Intelligence Agency, and Dr. Annette Krygiel, then Director, Central Imagery Office, were selected as Deputy Directors.

He was inducted into 2016 Geospatial Intelligence Hall of Fame.

== Accolades, and decorations ==
Rear Admiral Dantone was inducted into 2016 Geospatial Intelligence Hall of Fame.
Dantone flew over 150 combat missions in Southeast Asia. His military decorations include:

- Defense Superior Service Medal
- Legion of Merit
- Meritorious Service Medal
- Air Medal with combat "V" with numeral "8" and one gold star
- Navy Commendation Medal with combat "V"
- Vietnam Service Medal
- Southwest Asia Service Medal
- Kuwait Liberation Medal
- National Intelligence Medal of Achievement

Government offices
Preceded by Office established	Acting Director of the National Imagery and Mapping Agency; 1996 - 1998	Succeeded by James C. King
