= Arthur C. Lundahl =

American intelligence officer

Arthur Lundahl
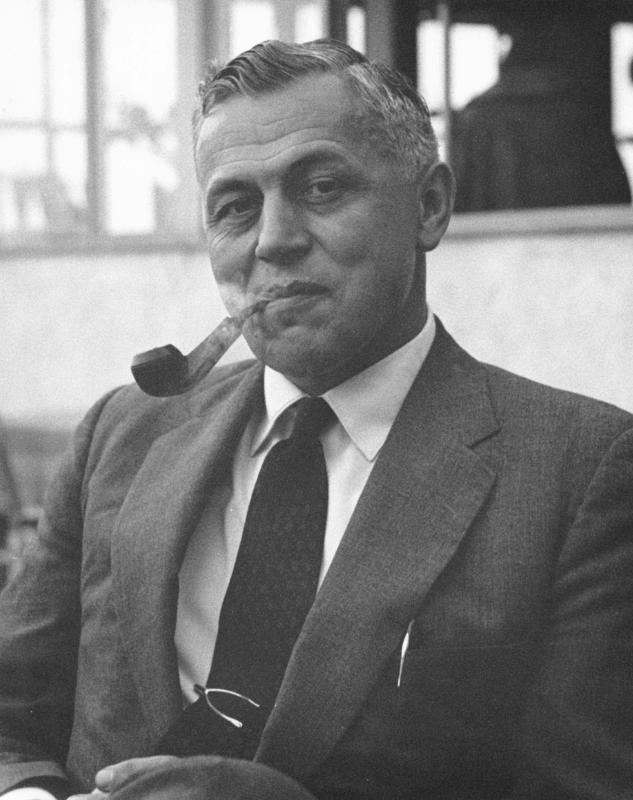

Director of the National Photographic Interpretation Center
- In office May 1953 – July 1973
- President: Dwight Eisenhower; John F. Kennedy; Lyndon Johnson; Richard Nixon
- Preceded by: Position established
- Succeeded by: John J. Hicks

Personal details
- Born: Arthur Charles Lundahl; April 1, 1915 Chicago, Illinois, U.S.
- Died: June 22, 1992 (aged 77) Bethesda, Maryland, U.S.
- Spouse: Mary Hvid (m. 1944)
- Children: 2
- Education: University of Chicago (BA, MA)
- Known for: Discovering Soviet Missiles in Cuba leading to the Cuban Missile Crisis; forerunner of American IMINT
- Awards: Full list
- Military career
- Allegiance: United States
- Branch: United States Navy
- Conflicts: World War II

Arthur Charles Lundahl KBE (1 April 1915 – June 22, 1992) was an American intelligence officer who is known for Cold War imagery intelligence (IMINT) and aerial reconnaissance. His work has been recognized for the discovery of Soviet missile installations in Cuba in 1962 which led to the Cuban Missile Crisis. He was responsible for establishing the Central Intelligence Agency's National Photographic Interpretation Center, a forerunner of the National Geospatial-Intelligence Agency, and led the photointerpretation section of the U-2 reconnaissance program. Analyzing reconnaissance films, he briefed presidents Eisenhower and Kennedy as well as the nation's top military and diplomatic officials. Lundahl provided critical intelligence on the arms race and many other international crises, including the Suez Crisis; Quemoy and Matsu, islands controlled by Taiwan; Tibet; Lebanon, and Laos.

== Early career ==
Born in Chicago, he trained in geology at the University of Chicago, obtaining a bachelor's degree in 1939 and a master's degree there in 1942.

Early in his career, he combined his academic training as a geologist with his hobby as a photographer, and became expert in interpreting details of pictures and distinguishing natural features from manmade construction. He developed his new skills during World War II while serving in the Navy, studying aerial photographs of targets in Japan and the Aleutian and Kuril islands.

== Postwar ==
After the war ended, he became "Chief Engineer" of the Photogrammetry Division of the Naval Photographic Interpretation Center (the original NPIC, which subsequently became known as the Naval Reconnaissance Technical Support Center - NRTSC). In 1953, he moved to the CIA, to lead the "Photographic Interpretation Division (PID), manage both general photointerpretation and then the products, in the late fifties, of the U-2 program. In 1954 he served as President of the American Society of Photogrammetry (ASP).

=== NPIC and the U-2 ===
In that effort, he combined photo interpretation, automatic data processing, photogrammetry, graphic arts, communications, collateral research, and technical analysis into the NPIC. According to his associate, Dino Brugioni, on July 4, 1956, using the U-2 aircraft, and within two months, the NPIC could put to rest the political accusation of a "bomber gap".

Next, the U-2 was used tactically to keep US policymakers informed on the Suez Crisis of 1956. Other U-2 missions analyzed by NPIC included flyovers of Tibet, the offshore islands of the PRC, and Lebanon. Overflights of the USSR continued until a U-2 was shot down in May 1960.

=== Unidentified Flying Objects ===
CIA documents indicate that the agency monitored the UFO situation starting in 1952. Lundahl's first meeting with a study group was in 1967.

==== Lundahl meets with Air Force contract team ====
In 1967, the Air Force issued a contract, to the University of Colorado, for the study of unidentified flying objects. BG Edward B. Giller, USAF, was the contract monitor, Dr. Thomas Rachford was the senior Air Force Scientist on the project, and the principal investigator from the University was Dr. E.U. Condon.

"On 20 February 1967 at 0915 Dr. Condon and four members of his investigative team visited NPIC. With Dr. Condon were Dr. Richard Love, University of Colorado, Dr. David Saunders, University of Colorado, Dr. William Price, Executive Director of APRST, and Dr. Rachford, USAF. The purpose of this visit was to familiarize Dr. Condon and members of his team with selected photogrammetric and photographic analysis capabilities of NPIC. Lundahl met with investigators of UFO reports ."

The meeting was allowed to discuss classified material through the SECRET level. NPIC established ground rules:

Any work performed by NPIC to assist Dr. Condon in his investigation will not be identified as work accomplished by CIA. Dr. Condon was advised by Mr. Lundahl to make no reference to CIA in regard to this work effort. Dr. Condon stated that if he felt it necessary to obtain an official CIA comment he would make a separate distinct entry into CIA not related to contacts he has with NPIC. NPIC will not prepare any written comments, will not analyze information with the intent of drawing a conclusion, nor prepare written reports. NPIC personnel will be available to assist Dr. Condon by performing work of photogrammetric nature, such as attempting to measure objects imaged on photographs that may be part of Dr. Condon's analysis. Work performed by NPIC will be strictly of a technical nature using services and equipment generally not available elsewhere.

In summary,

At about 1235 the group adjourned to lunch and following lunch they left NPIC for a meeting with Brig.Gen Gillers at the Pentagon. Most all the discussion during the morning was of an unclassified nature dealing with primary fundamentals of photogrammetry, photographic analysis and problems related to the acquiring of enough information to conduct meaningful analyses.

Condon and the same group met again in May 1967 at NPIC to hear an analysis of UFO photographs taken at Zanesville, Ohio. The analysis debunked that sighting. The committee was again impressed with the technical work performed, and Condon remarked that for the first time a scientific analysis of a UFO would stand up to investigation.

==== Discussion of UFO's with Jacque Vallée ====
On an episode of The Joe Rogan Experience podcast, computer scientist Jacque Vallée recounted a conversation he had with Lundahl about a piece of strange metal which had been shot off a UFO during a 1952 sighting over Washington, D.C.

== Beginnings of space-based photoreconnaissance ==
Lundahl gathered the NPIC staff on August 19, 1960, to show them the images from the first photoreconnaissance satellite, Discoverer 14, to fly with its camera. Introducing "something new and great we've got here." First showing a map of the Eastern European USSR, which previously had had a narrow line of photography from a U-2 high-altitude photographic aircraft, the new one had eight broad swaths running north to south across the USSR and Eastern Europe, covering over one-fifth of their total area. They represented the regions that this single mission had photographed, and people broke out in cheers. Some photos were fogged by electrostatic discharges, but the resolution was 20 to 30 feet, which analysts described as "good to very good."

== Cuban Missile Crisis ==
U-2 photographs taken on October 14, 1962, in which analysts, under Lundahl's direction, found visual evidence of the placement of Soviet SS-4 medium-range ballistic missiles (MRBM), capable of hitting targets, in the continental United States, with nuclear warheads. This triggered the Cuban Missile Crisis, sending the US intelligence community into maximum effort and triggering an unprecedented military alert.

His briefing of John F. Kennedy, on October 16, confirmed the Soviet weapons' presence, which had not been expected by the intelligence community or military. Lundahl began the briefing, with assistance from Acting Director of Central Intelligence whose voice is low and often difficult to hear. Lundahl introduced the technical expert on Soviet missiles, Sidney Graybeal ("our missile man"). Obviously concerned, the president then asks Graybeal when the missiles will be ready to fire.

In the oral history interview, Brugioni said that since intelligence tended to be staid, Lundahl encouraged Brugioni, if there was anything at all funny, to put it into the briefing package, so Lundahl could leave Kennedy smiling. Kennedy was known to dislike military jargon, and became annoyed with being told "the number of sites that were occupied, meaning each MRBM site had four pads and if there was a launcher on the pad, we'd say that that pad was occupied, meaning that a missile could be fired from that particular pad within four to six hours." He detested that and he got after McCone and he said, there ought to be a better way of telling me this. So, the crisis was over ... the day after the crisis was over, one of our low altitude planes happened to fly over a military latrine and the military latrines are open at the top and ... so I made the briefing broad and Mr. Lundahl gave it to John McCone. By this time, now Kennedy was four ... he knew that four pads and Mr. McCone said, Mr. President, he said, we have a new site in Cuba with three positions, with one position occupied and the President's jaw dropped and he looked at the photograph and of course, having served in the Pacific, and he saw what the site was. And he started laughing and he said, now I understand what occupied, unoccupied is, why didn't I have this primer earlier? So that even in the crisis period, there were humorous things.

"And one of the things that was very impressive to me was that the photography was driving the crisis. In fact policy papers that were told to be prepared, were coming maybe one day or two days later and by that time, the situation had completely changed. So ... the photography was creating a climate that was demanding that policy stay right with the photography. Now keep in mind, we were on two twelve hour shifts, but the policy-makers were only working eight to ten hours a day. So Lundahl raised the issue, maybe the policy-maker ought to be going into twelve hour shifts and then stay right with us at the centre as we were looking at the photography. Now that never occurred, but Lundahl raised the issue and later that would come up several times in crises in the future in which people did move into the centre."

Principally as a result of the photographic information and the diplomatic discussions that resulted from the knowledge, Kennedy pressured the Soviets to take back the missiles. Lundahl received a personal commendation from President Kennedy and NPIC received a Presidential Unit Citation.

== Continued development of satellite photography ==
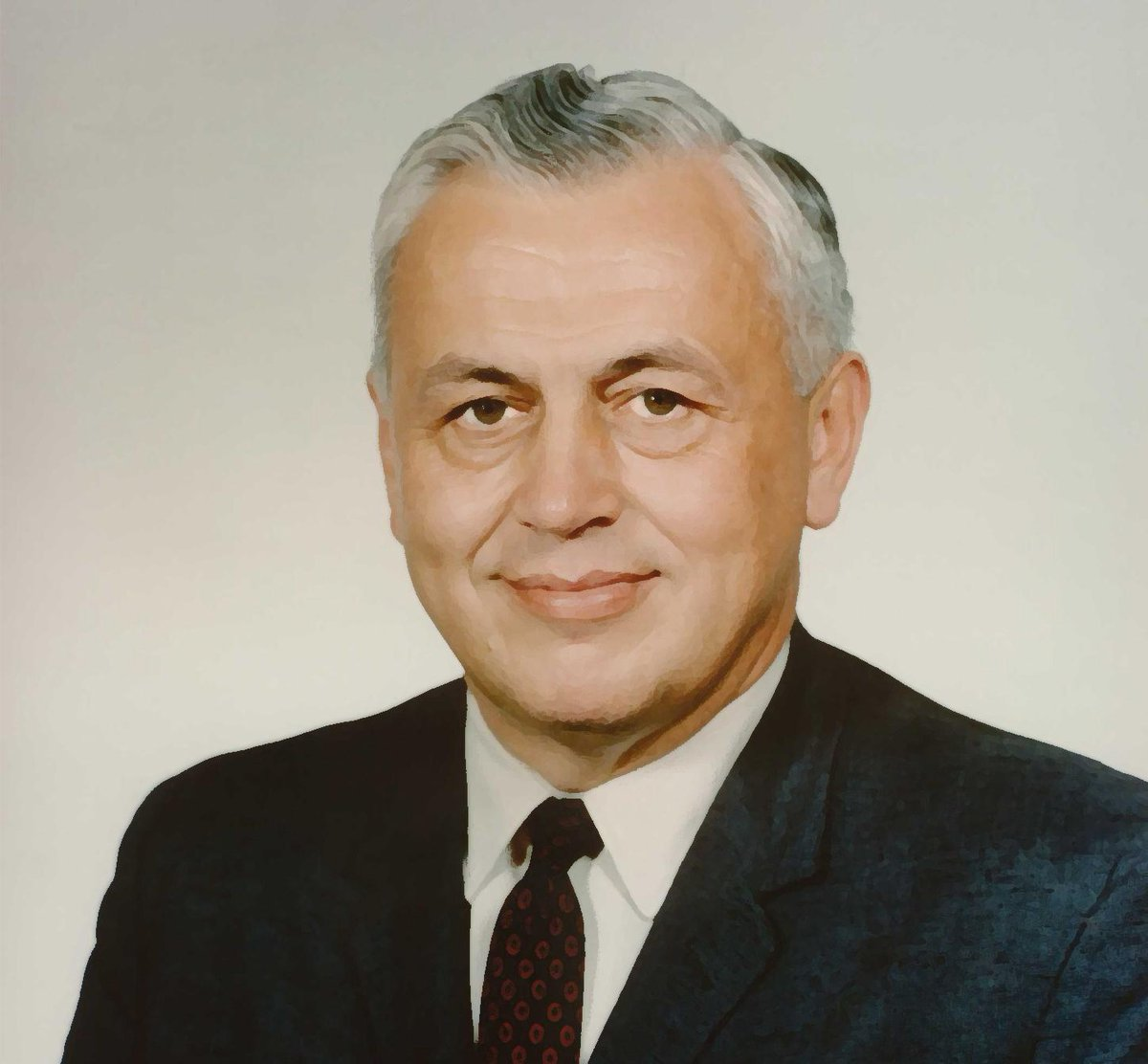
Lundahl in an undated CIA illustration.

After receiving a report from the Panel for Future Satellite Reconnaissance Operations, whose members included Edward Purcell, the chairman, Richard Garwin, Edwin Land, and NPIC director Arthur Lundahl, the CIA Directorate of Science and Technology directed Itek Corporation to stop work on the M-2 follow on to the CORONA satellite and concentrate on improving CORONA.

During those committee briefings, Lundahl covered the relationship between the resolution of an image and a photo interpreter's ability to extract intelligence from the photo. There was no difference, the CIA's chief photo interpreter told them, in the intelligence that could be derived from photographs with 10-foot resolution than those with 5-foot resolution. The Purcell group concluded that development of a new search system, with resolution between 4 and 6 feet was not justified.

== Awards ==
On the occasion of his retirement in June 1973 he received the National Security Medal, the highest honor of the US intelligence community, authorized by the President for "distinguished achievement or outstanding contribution in the field of intelligence relating to the national security." Lundahl was succeeded by John J. Hicks as director of NPIC.

He also received the CIA's Distinguished Intelligence Medal, and the DIA Director's Award for Exceptional Civilian Service.

He was inducted into the Order of the British Empire, with rank of Honorary Knight Commander, on 17 December 1974, the 11th American to be Knighted by the Queen of England.

== Death ==
Lundahl died of respiratory failure at the Suburban Hospital in Bethesda, Maryland, on June 22, 1992, at the age of 77. He was preceded in death by his wife of 42 years, Mary Hvid, who died in 1986. Together they had two children, Ann and Robert.

== In media ==
Lundahl appears in Thirteen Days: A Memoir of the Cuban Missile Crisis, by Robert F. Kennedy (1969), and was portrayed by Dakin Matthews in the 2000 film adaptation.

Government offices
Preceded by Office established	Director of the National Photographic Interpretation Center; May 1953 – July 1973	Succeeded by John J. Hicks
