= Nancy E. Bone =

Former US intelligence service director

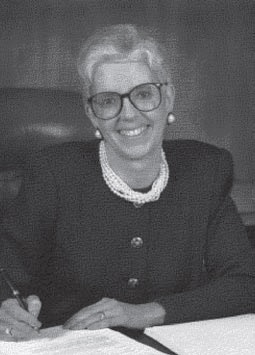
Nancy E. Bone

Nancy E. Bone is an American former intelligence officer who served as Director of National Photographic Interpretation Center from October 1993 to September 1996.

== Biography ==
Ms. Bone joined the Central Intelligence Agency (CIA) in July 1968 and was assigned to the National Photographic Interpretation Center (NPIC). She began her career indexing and coding imagery intelligence reports for national data bases. Upon earning a Master’s Degree in Library Science she was promoted into her first management position.

Over the next several years she held a number of increasingly senior management positions including Chief of NPIC’s Priority Exploitation Group and its Imagery Exploitation Group, and Director of CIA’s Office of Imagery Analysis. She also held three senior staff positions, one in NPIC, one in the CIA’s Directorate of Science and Technology, and one in Canberra, Australia.

In 1993 she was named NPIC’s seventh director, the first director to come from within the Center’s ranks and its first female. When she joined CIA in 1968, women in leadership positions were rare. By the time she retired in December 1999, they were not.

While director, Ms. Bone approved a series of projects to improve and modernize NPIC’s 35-year-old intelligence production and personnel management practices. Many were groundbreaking and promised to have a significant impact on NPIC’s employees and its imagery intelligence reporting. She also spearheaded the effort to improve information sharing which led to the first time NPIC analysts and support personnel could electronically access CIA files, exchange work documents, and communicate with colleagues. She also pushed NPIC to increase dissemination of digital products and become a major provider of products and information on classified shared networks, increasing the availability of NPIC products for customers worldwide.

Ms. Bone served as D/NPIC until October 1996 when NPIC was absorbed into what was to become the National Geographic-Intelligence Agency. In October 2017, she was inducted into the Geospatial Intelligence Hall of Fame.

Government offices
Preceded by Leo A. Hazlewood	Director of the National Photographic Interpretation Center; May 1953 – July 1973	Succeeded by Office dissolved to form National Imagery and Mapping Agency
