= John J. Hicks =

Former US intelligence service director

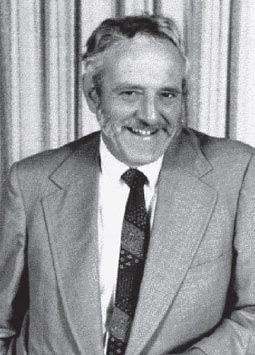
- Died: March 29, 1997; McLean, Virginia, U.S.
- Education: Carleton College, Northfield (BA in International Relations); School of Advanced International Studies (MA in International Relations)
- Occupation: Intelligence Officer

John J. Hicks was the second director of National Photographic Interpretation Center (NPIC). Hicks was appointed as the Director of NPIC in July 1973, after retirement of Arthur C. Lundahl, first director of NPIC. He served as the Director of NPIC from July 1973 to May 1978.

== Early life ==
Hicks graduated in 1943 from Carleton College, Northfield, Minnesota with BA in international relations. In 1947, he earned MA in international relations from School of Advanced International Studies, Washington DC.

== Career in CIA and NPIC ==
Hicks served as a combat officer in the US Marine Corps from October 1943 to March 1946. After his graduate study, he joined the Department of the Army’s G-2 staff, where he served from September 1947 to April 1952. In April 1952 Hicks joined the Central Intelligence Agency as an intelligence officer in the Office of Current Intelligence, where he served until 1967. He then served in the Office of Strategic Research for two years. Between November 1969 and August 1973, Hicks held the position of Executive Director of the National Photographic Interpretation Center. After his term as director of NPIC, Hicks returned to the CIA as an intelligence officer in the National Foreign Assessment Center. He became deputy director of that center in January 1979.

Hicks retired from public service in January 1980. He died on March 29, 1997.

== Accolades ==
Hicks was awarded the Certificate of Merit for his work during the Cuban Missile Crisis. He was also awarded the CIA Intelligence Medal of Merit, the National Intelligence Distinguished Service Medal, and the CIA Distinguished Service Medal.

Government offices
Preceded by Arthur C. Lundahl	Director of the National Photographic Interpretation Center; June 1978 – February 1984	Succeeded by Rutledge P. Hazzard
