= Frank J. Ruocco =

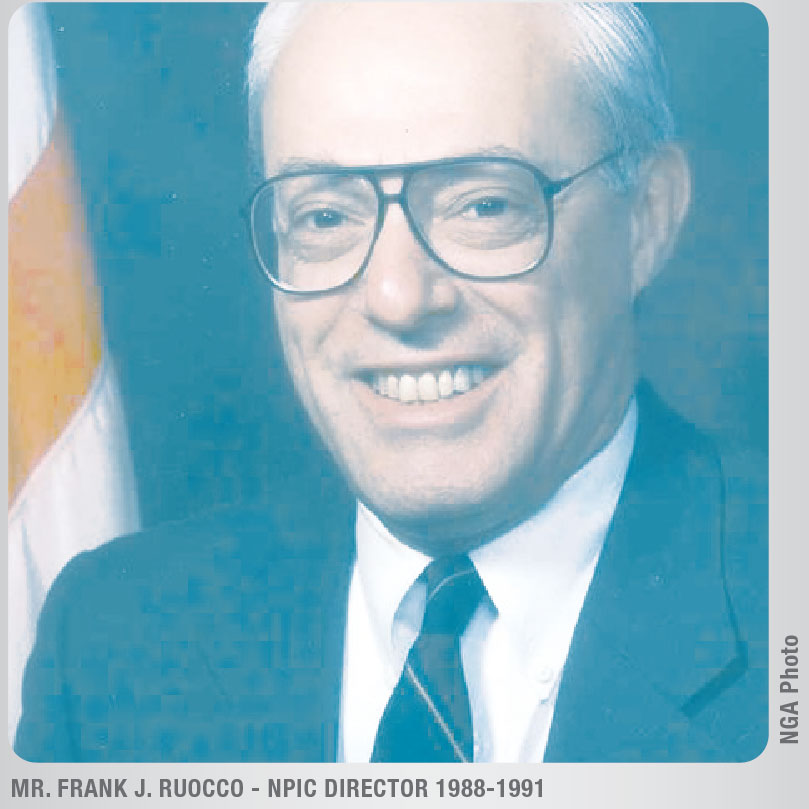
Frank J. Ruocco

Frank J. Ruocco was fifth director of National Photographic Interpretation Center (NPIC) from February 1988 to February 1991.

== Career ==
Frank J. Ruocco graduated from St. Peter's College in 1962 and spent three years as a commissioned officer in the U.S. Navy. He attended the Naval War College in 1974–1975.

In 1965, he joined the Central Intelligence Agency (CIA). For twenty-three years he served in the Directorate of Intelligence as analyst, supervisor and manager in the Office of Strategic Research (1965–1980); Deputy Director, Office of Imagery Analysis (1980–1982); Chief (of) Collection, Requirements, and Evaluation Staff (1962–1985); and Director, Office of Information Resources (1986–1988).

Ruocco became director of NPIC in February 1988. After serving as director of the NPIC for three years, in 1991 he joined the CIA Directorate of Administration as director of the Office of Security. In 1992 he was selected to be deputy director of Administration. He retired from the agency in 1995, after 30 years of distinguished service.

Government offices
Preceded by Robert M. Huffstutler	Director of the National Photographic Interpretation Center; February 1988 – February 1991	Succeeded by Leo A. Hazlewood
