= National technical means of verification =

Methods of verification of adherence to international treaties

National technical means of verification (NTM) are monitoring techniques, such as satellite photography, used to verify adherence to international treaties. The phrase first appeared, but was not detailed, in the Strategic Arms Limitation Treaty (SALT) between the US and USSR. At first, the phrase reflected a concern that the "Soviet Union could be particularly disturbed by public recognition of this capability [satellite photography]...which it has veiled." In modern usage, the term covers a variety of monitoring technologies, including others used at the time of SALT I.

It continues to appear in subsequent arms control negotiations, which have a general theme called "trust but verify". Verification, in addition to information explicitly supplied from one side to the other, involves numerous technical intelligence disciplines. Measurement and Signature Intelligence (MASINT) techniques, many being especially obscure technical methods, are extremely important parts of verification.

Outside of treaties, the techniques described here are critical in overall counterproliferation work. They can gather information on the states, with known or presumed nuclear weapons, that have not ratified (or are withdrawing from) the Nuclear Non-Proliferation Treaty: India, Israel, North Korea, and Pakistan.

While the techniques here are focused primarily at missile and nuclear weapons limitation, the general principles hold for verification of treaties to counter the proliferation of chemical and biological warfare capabilities: "trust but verify".

== Imagery intelligence ==
Imagery intelligence (IMINT) taken by satellites (e.g., US CORONA, KH-5, etc.) covert high-altitude reconnaissance aircraft (e.g., Lockheed U-2) and drones/unmanned aerial vehicles (e.g., Global Hawk), and sensor-carrying aircraft allowed by treaty (e.g., OC-135B Open Skies), is a fundamental method of verification. Specific "protocols" spelling out the details of treaty implementation may require cooperation with IMINT, such as opening the doors of missile silos at agreed-to times, or making modifications to aircraft capable of nuclear weapons delivery, such that these aircraft can be identified in photographs.

These methods provide an actual count of delivery vehicles. Although they cannot look inside and count warheads or bombs.

Interpretation involves art, science, and experience. For example, US intelligence used a discipline called "crateology" to recognize Soviet missiles and bombers, from the distinctive way the Soviets crated them for ocean shipment. Dino Brugioni gives an extensive account of imagery interpretation during the Cuban Missile Crisis in his book, Eyeball to Eyeball. The methodology he describes for counting missiles moving into Cuba, emplaced there, and later removed are direct parallels to the way in which imagery is used for verification in arms control.

== Telemetry intelligence ==
Telemetry intelligence (TELINT) is one of the "national means of technical verification" under the Strategic Arms Limitation Treaty (SALT). TELINT collects and analyzes the signals transmitted during missile tests, providing direct measurements of a missile's flight characteristics—most importantly its throw‑weight, which determines the potential mass of its nuclear warheads. SALT I obliges each party "not to interfere with national technical means of verification" and prohibits "deliberate concealment measures to impede verification," a clause that effectively bars encrypting or otherwise obscuring strategic test telemetry to thwart TELINT monitoring.

== Electro-optical and radar sensors in verification ==
Telemetry intelligence on a missile test is frequently combined with electro-optical intelligence and radar tracking from cameras on aircraft (e.g., US RC-135 COBRA BALL), ground stations (e.g., US Cobra Dane) and ships (e.g., US Cobra Judy, Cobra King, Cobra Gemini). Observed trajectories, speeds, etc., can be used to verify the TELINT information is accurate. Even though some of these techniques do take pictures, these, as a whole, are considered MASINT.

Methods continue to evolve. COBRA JUDY was intended to gather information on long-range missiles, in a strategic role. One developmental system, COBRA GEMINI, was intended to complement COBRA JUDY. It can be used for observing long-range missiles, but is also appropriate for theater-level weapons, which may be addressed in regional arms limitation agreements, such as the Missile Technology Control Regime (MCTR). Where COBRA JUDY is built into a ship, this dual frequency (S- and X-band) radar is transportable, capable of operating on ships or on land, and optimized for monitoring medium range ballistic missiles and antimissile systems. It is air-transportable to deal with sudden monitoring contingencies. Cobra Gemini was installed aboard USNS Invincible (T-AGM-24) around 2000.

Cobra King was the Cobra Judy replacement that entered service on USNS Howard O. Lorenzen (T-AGM-25) in 2014.

== Space-based nuclear energy detection ==
In 1959, the US started to experiment with space-based nuclear sensors, beginning with the VELA HOTEL satellites. These were originally intended to detect nuclear explosions in space, using X-ray, neutron and gamma-ray detectors. Advanced VELA satellites added devices called bhangmeters, which could detect nuclear tests on earth by detecting a characteristic signature of nuclear bursts: a double light flash, with the flashes milliseconds apart. These satellites also could detect electromagnetic pulse signatures from events on Earth.

Several more advanced satellites replaced the early VELAs, and the function exists today as the Integrated Operational Nuclear Detection System (IONDS), as an additional function on the NAVSTAR satellites used for GPS navigation information.

== Space-based staring infrared sensors ==
The US, in 1970, launched the first of a series of space-based staring array sensors that detected and located infrared heat signatures. Such signatures, which are associated with measurement of energy and location, are not pictures in the IMINT sense. Currently called the Satellite Early Warning System (SEWS), the program is the descendant of several generations of Defense Support Program spacecraft.

Originally intended to detect the intense heat of an ICBM launch, this system proved useful at a theater level in 1990–1991. It detected the launch of Iraqi Scud missiles in time to give early warning to potential targets.

When an arms control agreement, such as the MCTR, limits missile technology transfer, this system can detect missile launches that may have been a result of inappropriate transfer, or independent development by a nation that has not imported rocket motors.

== Geophysical intelligence ==
US Army Field Manual 2-0 defines geophysical intelligence as a branch of MASINT. "It involves phenomena transmitted through the earth (ground, water, atmosphere) and manmade structures including emitted or reflected sounds, pressure waves, vibrations, and magnetic field or ionosphere disturbances."

=== Seismic intelligence ===
US Army Field Manual 2-0 defines seismic intelligence as "The passive collection and measurement of seismic waves or vibrations in the earth surface." In the context of verification, seismic intelligence makes use of the science of seismology to locate and characterize nuclear testing, especially underground testing. Seismic sensors also can characterize large conventional explosions that are used in testing the high-explosive components of nuclear weapons.

In 1960, George Kistiakowsky introduced the "threshold principle" that balances the needs of arms control with the realities of seismic verification. He cited the difficulty in monitoring missile submarines, and proposed that the arms control strategy focus on disarmament rather than inspections into verification, which accepts that nations may do nuclear, or simulated nuclear, testing of an explosive yield below the energy level that seismic intelligence sensors can detect. All nuclear testing, of any level, was forbidden under the Comprehensive Test Ban Treaty (CTBT) (which has not entered into force), but there is controversy over whether the Comprehensive Nuclear-Test-Ban Treaty Organization (CTBTO) or its preparatory commission will be able to detect sufficiently small events. It is possible to gain valuable data from a nuclear test that has an extremely low yield, useless as a weapon but sufficient to test weapons technology. CTBT does not recognize the threshold principle and assumes all tests are detectable.

The CTBTO will operate an International Monitoring System (IMS) of MASINT sensors for verification, which include seismic, acoustic, and radionuclide techniques. It is controversial if the IMS will be able to detect all events.

Bailey are concerned that "Opponents of the CTBT are most concerned about one issue: in the absence of nuclear testing, U.S. nuclear weapons can be neither as safe nor as reliable as they should be. … While the treaty will constrain the United States from modernizing and developing weapons, it will be possible for other nations to cheat with little or no risk of being caught because the CTBT cannot be verified....The IMS of the CTBT is expected to provide the ability to detect, locate, and identify nonevasive nuclear testing of yields of 1 kiloton or greater. It will not beable to detect, with any significant degree of confidence, nuclear testing below 1 kiloton. If the test is evasively conducted, the system will not detect a test of several kilotons."

Advocates of the CTBT Paine argues "...there is recent demonstration that the IMS will be able to detect and identify non-evasive explosions of less than 1 kiloton in some strategically important areas." Initial indications, in August 1997, pointed to a seismic event in Novaya Zemlya, which is Russia's main test site. At first, it was believed to be a hidden nuclear test. IMS sensors, however, helped locate the event offshore, in the Kara Sea. IMS also established that it was an earthquake, not an explosion.

"Had this been an underground nuclear test, its magnitude (3.3) would have corresponded to a yield of less than 100 tons (0.1 kilotons) in the absence of evasive measures. A nearby event identified as an earthquake in January 1996 was a factor of ten smaller (2.4), corresponding to a yield of about 10 tons." Opponents of the IMS had claimed the best that could be done was to recognize a 1 kt event, not concealed and of Richter magnitude 4.0.

Paine seems to assume that tests will still be in a plausible weapons range, and a 10-ton yield still might be useful in some tactical applications. There is a class of applied research testing, hydronuclear tests, that yield useful information but have a yield as low as a kilogram, up to low tons. Hydronuclear tests do involve nuclear reactions, but very small ones. A technique that actually may have more explosive yield, of high explosive, is hydrodynamic testing, in which extremely fast X-ray, neutron, or other specialized camera measure, in microseconds, the explosive compression of a fissionable material simulant. Depleted uranium, for example, has the same physical properties as enriched uranium, and is similar to plutonium.

=== Acoustic intelligence ===
Sensors relatively close to a nuclear event, or a high-explosive test simulating a nuclear event, can detect, using acoustic methods, the pressure produced by the blast. These include infrasound microbarographs (acoustic pressure sensors) that detect very low-frequency sound waves in the atmosphere produced by natural and man-made events.

Closely related to the microbarographs, but detecting pressure waves in water, are hydro-acoustic sensors, both underwater microphones and specialized seismic sensors that detect the motion of islands.

== On-site inspection ==
The US and Russia have agreed to have, under controlled conditions, inspectors from the other side physically examine locations at which a forbidden nuclear test, possibly below other detection thresholds, may have taken place. In the United States, these programs are operated by the Defense Threat Reduction Agency, which superseded the On-Site Inspection Agency.

While inspection procedures as specific as those for nuclear weapons have not been developed for chemical and biological threats, on-site inspection is likely to be needed, as far more chemical and biological manufacturing processes have dual-use properties: they can be employed for perfectly legitimate civilian purposes. The Director of DTRA is also "dual-hatted" as the head of the Center for Combating Weapons of Mass Destruction (SCC WMD), an agency of the US Department of Defense's Strategic Command. This mission also relates to that of the CIA Counterproliferation Center.

== Materials intelligence and air sampling ==
Nuclear tests, including underground tests that vent into the atmosphere, produce fallout that not only indicates that a nuclear event has taken place, but, through radiochemical analysis of radionuclides in the fallout, characterize the technology and source of the device. For example, a pure fission device will have different fallout products from a boosted fission device, which, in turn, differ from various types of thermonuclear devices.

One real-world example is a review of how xenon by-product levels could be used to distinguish if air sampling from a North Korean test, either atmospheric testing or leakage from an underground test, could be used to determine if the bomb was nuclear, and, if so, whether the primary was plutonium or highly enriched uranium.

== A case study: multiple intelligence disciplines characterizing atmospheric nucleartests ==
France tested its first nuclear weapon on February 13, 1960 in Algeria. This came as no surprise, as multiple US intelligence sources and methods had been following the program since France began considering nuclear weapons in 1946.

After Algerian independence, France moved its test range to French islands in the Tuamoto Archipelago in the Western Pacific. Typical monitoring scenarios for tests in 1968 and 1970 involved NSA COMINT determining that a French test was imminent. Upon that notice, KC-135R tankers, temporarily modified to carry MASINT sensors, would fly around the test area, as part of Operation BURNING LIGHT. One sensor system measured the electromagnetic pulse of the detonation. Another system photographed the nuclear cloud to measure its density and opacity.

During FY 1974, additional SAC missions were flown to gather information on Chinese and French tests. U-2R aircraft, in Operation OLYMPIC RACE, flew missions, near Spain, to capture actual airborne particles that meteorologists predicted would be in that airspace.

BURNING LIGHT, the airborne EMP and cloud photography program, was the manned aircraft portion of a larger Defense Nuclear Agency program called HULA HOOP (1973 name) and DICE GAME (1974 name). Another portion of this program involved a US Navy ship, in international waters, that sent unmanned air sampling drones into the cloud. So, in 1974, both U-2R and drone aircraft captured actual airborne particles from nuclear blasts for the MASINT discipline of nuclear materials intelligence, while the BURNING LIGHT aircraft worked in the electro-optical and radio frequency (EMP) MASINT disciplines.
