= Dino Brugioni =

American intelligence analyst

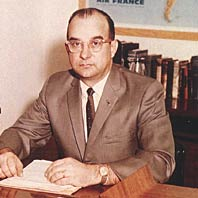
- Dino Brugioni in 1963
- Born: December 16, 1921; Bevier, Missouri, U.S.
- Died: September 25, 2015 (aged 93); Fredericksburg, Virginia, U.S.
- Education: George Washington University (BA, MA)
- Known for: Imagery analysis; Bomb damage assessment
- Spouse: Theresa Harich (m. 1949; died 2004)
- Children: 2

Dino Antonio Brugioni (December 16, 1921 – September 25, 2015) was an American intelligence analyst. He was a senior official at the CIA's National Photographic Interpretation Center (NPIC), working as an imagery analyst and also serving as NPIC's Chief of Information. During his 35-year career, Brugioni helped establish imagery intelligence (IMINT) as a national asset to solve intelligence problems. Even after retirement, Brugioni was considered to be the world's foremost imagery intelligence analyst.

After retirement, he was active in encouraging the use of declassified photographic intelligence for historical research. His book, Eyeball to Eyeball is an extensive unclassified history of US imagery intelligence.

== Background ==
Brugioni, the son of Italian immigrants, was born in Bevier, Missouri on December 16, 1921, and grew up there and in Jefferson City, Missouri.

Brugioni flew in the 66th Bomb Squadron and a number of reconnaissance missions in World War II over North Africa, Italy, Germany, Yugoslavia and France. He received the Purple Heart, 9 Air Medals and a Distinguished Unit Citation.

In 1949, Brugioni married Theresa Harich (d. 2004), and they had two children. He died at his home in Fredericksburg, Virginia, on September 25, 2015, aged 93.

== Career ==
=== Role in Russian bomber and missile gaps ===
After the war, Brugioni received BA and MA degrees in Foreign Affairs from George Washington University. He joined the CIA in March 1948 and became an expert in Soviet industries. In 1955, he was selected as a member of the cadre of the newly formed Photographic Intelligence Division that would interpret U-2, SR-71 and satellite photography. The American U-2 spy plane began flights over Russia in 1956. Under the cover of an abandoned Washington car dealership, the first CIA analysts were assembled to review the U-2's photos. The founding analysts included Dino Brugioni and small team of World War II photo interpreters, under the direction of Art Lundahl. Analysis of U-2 photography dispelled the "bomber gap" in 1956 and the "missile gap" in 1961. Analysis was also conducted on U-2 photography taken during the Suez, Lebanon, Chinese Off-Shore Islands, Middle East and Tibetan crises.

In January 1961, Lundahl's CIA group acquired military imagery intelligence capabilities to form the National Photographic Interpretation Center (NPIC), as a part of the CIA Directorate of Science and Technology. Brugioni was a key deputy to Lundahl.

His first assignments included counting Russian bombers, finding new Soviet airbases and assessing Russian naval readiness. He then was intimately involved in the Cuban Missile Crisis (see below)

=== Role in the Cuban Missile Crisis ===
U-2 photographs taken on October 14, 1962, by some of the first U-2 aircraft piloted by US Air Force members rather than CIA personnel, brought back photographs, in which the NPIC analysts found visual evidence of the placement of Soviet SS-4 medium-range ballistic missiles (MRBM), capable of hitting targets, in the continental United States, with nuclear warheads. This triggered the Cuban Missile Crisis, sending the US intelligence community into maximum effort and triggering an unprecedented military alert.

The October 14 high-altitude photographs, taken from the periphery of Cuba, led to the US taking the additional risk of direct overflights of Cuba, at the orders of Secretary of Defense Robert S. McNamara. McNamara, Chief of Naval Operations George Whelan Anderson Jr and Lundahl concurred that the US Navy's Light Photographic Squadron VFP-62, flying F8U-1P Crusader fighters in a reconnaissance role, were best qualified to take low-level photographs, flying directly over Cuba. As well as the U-2 photographs, the low-level Navy photographs also streamed into NPIC, where Brugioni and colleagues analyzed them around the clock.

Klein (2002) described Lundahl's presenting the October 14 photographs and their interpretation to President John F. Kennedy: "Mr. Lundahl, when Kennedy was shown the photographs, he turned his head, looked at Lundahl, and said, "Are you sure?" And Mr. Lundahl said, "I'm as sure of this, Mr. President, as we can be sure of anything in the photo interpretation field. And you must admit that we have not led you astray on anything that we have reported to you previously." And the President said "Okay.""

Brugioni's book, although a general history, deals extensively with the role of imagery intelligence in the Cuban Missile Crisis. A selection of the actual photographs, as well as supporting data such as the chart of CIA photo are at the George Washington University National Security Archive.

Another source on technique, discussing the obscure technique of "crateology", or recognizing the characteristic ways in which the Soviets crated military equipment, is Hilsman's To Move a Nation. A photograph analyzed using the crateology technique is shown in.

=== After the Cuban Missile Crisis ===
Later assignments included finding chemical and nuclear weapons, missile sites and test blast areas. He provided intelligence to policymakers during World War II, the Cold War, the Cuban Missile Crisis, the Vietnam War and the Yom Kippur War.

=== Zapruder Film ===
In a video interview by Doug Horne (actually a digest of excerpts from nine interviews by Peter Janney and Doug Horne), Dino Brugioni said that he and his team examined the 8mm Zapruder film of the John F. Kennedy assassination the evening of Saturday November 23, 1963, and into the morning of Sunday November 24, 1963, when he was the weekend duty officer at the CIA's National Photographic Interpretation Center. Dino and his team projected the film for two members of the Secret Service several times, and they indicated which frames they wanted prints made from, which in turn should be included on the briefing boards. Dino indicated in the interview that he was positive that they had the original film, and that when they projected it for the two members of the Secret Service, it was the first time they had viewed the film. After creating the required duplicate negatives from the desired frames, the film was returned to the two members of the Secret Service, and that at approximately 3 AM they left the NPIC facility. He and his team then made up two identical sets of briefing boards, one set for CIA Director John McCone and one for the Secret Service, but both were eventually delivered to the CIA Director who would in turn provide a set to the Secret Service. Each set was consisted of two boards, hinged in the middle, and contained between 12 and 15 prints of frames from the film, with the frame number indicated on the board. Brugioni prepared identical one sheet of notes that accompanied each set the briefing boards, which included the name of each person who had seen the film and worked on the production of the prints and briefing boards. When the work was complete, Dino Brugioni reviewed the briefing boards and notes with his superior, Arthur Lundahl, whom he had called and requested come to the facility. The briefing boards and notes were then turned over to Arthur Lundahl.

Brugioni said he was not aware of a second examination of the film at NPIC, the night of Sunday November 24 and the early morning of Monday November 25, by a completely different team. Apparently the team that worked on the second examination was given 16mm film and made up another, and possibly larger, series of frame prints, and that another set of briefing boards was also created.

Brugioni thought the Zapruder Film in the National Archives today, and available to the public, has been altered from the version of the film he saw and worked with on November 23–24. Specifically, the version of the Zapruder Film Brugioni recalls seeing had more than one frame of the fatal head shot to Kennedy with its resulting "spray" of brain matter that he referred to as a "white cloud", three or four feet above Kennedy's head. The version of the Zapruder film available to the public depicts the fatal head shot on only one frame of the film, frame 313. Additionally, Brugioni was adamant that the set of briefing boards available to the public in the National Archives is not the set that he and his team produced on November 23–24, 1963.

=== After retirement: using photo-intelligence for historical research ===
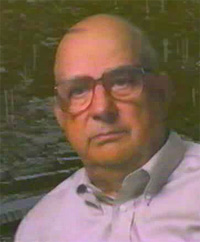
Dino Brugioni in 1996

As more and more intelligence photographs are declassified, essentially all from World War II and a great many from the CORONA, ARGON, LANYARD and GAMBIT satellites, Brugioni became active in guiding historians to use these collections in historical research.

=== After-the-fact intelligence about Auschwitz ===
Brugioni was one of the first historians to present photographic evidence of Auschwitz. A photographic plane was photographing an I.G. Farben factory in the general area, and didn't turn off its camera until after it had passed over the Monowitz camp. The factory was the main interest, and World War II interpreters just marked Auschwitz as an unidentified installation. No one in that organization knew about human intelligence reports of the death camps, and only in the seventies did researchers learn the significance of the camp photographs.

Brugioni explains why Allied intelligence knew little about the targets, even after the President asked that the camps be bombed.

When the bombing specialists were ordered to formulate plans for bombing the Auschwitz-Birkenau Extermination Complex, officials of the Air Ministry, the Royal Air Force Bomber Command and the U.S. 8th Air Force bemoaned the lack of aerial photographic coverage of the complex. In fact, such photos were readily available at the Allied Central Interpretation Unit at Royal Air Force Station Medmenham, 50 miles outside London and at the Mediterranean Allied Photo Reconnaissance Wing in Italy. The ultimate irony was that no search for the aerial photos was ever instituted by either organization. In retrospect, it is a fact that by the time the Soviet Army reached Auschwitz on January 27, 1945, the Allies had photographed the Auschwitz-Birkenau Extermination Complex at least 30 times.

Brugioni was an authority on contrived or altered photography, described in his book Photo Fakery. His interest in the Civil War in the West is chronicled in The Civil War in Missouri and his interest in reconnaissance in From Balloons to Blackbirds. Brugioni wrote more than 90 articles, mainly on the application of overhead imagery to intelligence and other fields. He helped with and appeared in over 75 news and historical television programs.

Brugioni received numerous citations and commendations, including the CIA Intelligence Medal of Merit, the CIA Career Intelligence Medal and the prestigious U.S. Government Pioneer in Space Medal for his role in the development of satellite reconnaissance. He twice received the Sherman Kent Award, the CIA's top award for outstanding contributions to intelligence. However, he was most proud of the commendation he received from President John F. Kennedy for contributions during the Cuban Missile Crisis. On April 13, 2005, he was inducted into the National Geospatial-Intelligence Agency Hall of Fame.

== Bibliography ==
Books

- The Civil War in Missouri As Seen from the Capital City. Jefferson City: Summers Publishing, 1987.
- Eyeball to Eyeball. Ed. Robert F. McCort. New York: Random House, 1990.
- From Balloons to Blackbirds: Recommaissance, Surveillance and Military Intelligence: How It Evolved. McLean: The Association of Former Intelligence Officers, 1993.
- Photo Fakery: The History and Techniques of Photographic Deception and Manipulation. McLean: Brassey's, 1999.
- Eyes in the Sky: Eisenhower, the CIA and Cold War Aerial Espionage. Annapolis: U.S. Naval Institute Press, 2010.

Articles

- "The Unidentifieds." Studies in Intelligence. Summer 1969.
- "Spotting Photo Fakery." Studies in Intelligence. Winter 1969.
- "The Serendipity Effect." Studies in Intelligence. Spring 1970.
- "The Cuban Missile Crisis, Phase I." Studies in Intelligence. Fall 1972.
- "The Case of the Missing Diamond." Studies in Intelligence. Spring 1979.
- "The Million Dollar Photograph." Studies in Intelligence. Summer 1979.
- "The Holocaust Revisited: A Retrospective Analysis of the Auschwitz-Birkenau Extermination Complex." Intelligence Journal. Spring 1979.
- "President Truman and the Congolese SAM." Studies in Intelligence. Fall 1979.
- "Aerial Photography: Adding a New Dimension to History." Air and Space. November–December 1979.
- "Aerial Reconnaissance." Lecture. Smithsonian Institution. December 12, 1979.
- "A Priceless Record." Studies in Intelligence. Spring 1981.
- "Precision Bombing Pays Off." Air Force Magazine. June 1982.
- "Auschwitz-Birkenau: Why the World War II Photo Interpreters Failed to Identify the Extermination Complex." Military Intelligence Magazine. January–March 1983.
- "Hiding the Aircraft Factories." Air Force Magazine. March 1983.
- "Das Rustzueg Zum Durchhalten." Stern Magazine. April 14, 1983.
- "Aerial Photographs: An Overlooked Resource." Fortitudine. Spring 1983.
- "Why Didn’t the Feds Block the West’s Floods?" The Washington Post. July 3, 1983.
- "Capitol Theater Evokes Fond Memories." Jefferson City News Tribune. August 7, 1983.
- "Smoke Job." Air and Space Magazine. Summer 1983.
- "The Census: It can Be Done More Accurately Using Space Age Technology." Photogrammetric Engineering and Remote Sensing. September 1983.
- "Crisis Humor." The Retired Officer. October 1983.
- "Tarawa – A New Perspective." Leatherneck Magazine. November 1983.
- "Will the Feds Allow Floods Again?" Rescue Magazine. Winter 1983.
- "Statement of Dino A. Brugioni Concerning the Role of Information Technology in Emergency Management before the Subcommittee on Investigations and Oversight of the Committee on Science and Technology." U.S. House of Representatives. November 16, 1983.
- "Intelligence Community’s Space Age Technologies Could Aid in Disaster Prediction and Prevention." Hazard Monthly. January 22, 1984.
- "We’re Missing the Boat on Flood Prevention." Los Angeles Times. January 22, 1984.
- "The Tyuratam Enigma." Air Force Magazine. March 1984.
- "Aerial Photography: Reading the Past, Revealing the Future." Smithsonian Magazine. March 1984.
- "Aerial Photography: An Endangered Historical Legacy." Imaging Quarterly. May 1984.
- "The Class of ’39: The Way We Were." Jefferson City Post-Tribune. July 15, 1984.
- "Photo Interpretation and Photogrammetry in World War II." Photogrammetric Engineering and Remote Sensing." September 1984.
- "Arlington and Fairfax Counties: Land of Many Reconnaissance Firsts." Northern Virginia Heritage. February 1985.
- "The Town of Bergen, the Death Camp of Belsen." Jewish Week. May 9, 1985.
- "The Last Days of the Bergen-Belsen Camp." The Jewish Newspaper. May 23, 1985.
- "A POW Camp Lost in History?" U.S. Naval Institute Proceedings. July 1985.
- "The Civil War: Jefferson City, a City Divided." Six-part series. Jefferson City Post-Tribune. July 14–19, 1985.
- "New Roles for Recce." Air Force Magazine. October 1985.
- "Aerial Photography: A Challenge and a Commitment." "Perspectives," American Historical Association Newsletter. November 1985.
- "Aerial Photography: World Class Disaster Fighter." With Arthur C. Lundahl. Information Society. Vol. 3. No. 4. November 1985.
- "William Colby: Intelligence Officer." Address. Woodrow Wilson International Center for Scholars at the Smithsonian Institution. March 4, 1986.
- "Recon to the Rescue." Airman Magazine. July 1986.
- "The President, Khe Sanh and the 26th Marines." Leatherneck Magazine. September 1986.
- "Aerial Photography and Multisensor Imagery: Opening New Vistas on the World." Renewable Resources Journal. Autumn 1986.
- "Satellite Images on TV: The Camera Can Lie." The Washington Post. December 14, 1986.
- "The Impact and Social Implications of Commercial Remote Sensing Satellites." Address to U.S. Congress, Office of Technology Assessment. December 30, 1986.
- "The Fraulini Family." History of Macon County, Missouri, Sesquicentennial Edition. 1987.
- "Life’s Most Joyful Role: Being a Grandparent." Rural Living. May 1987.
- "Naval Photo Intel in WW II." U.S. Naval Institute Proceedings. June 1987.
- "Lawrence K. White on the Directors." Studies in Intelligence. Winter 1987.
- "Photo Reconnaissance." Naval Aviation News. January–February 1988.
- "The Art of Aerial Photography." Photogrammetric Engineering and Remote Sensing. With Robert McCort. February 1988.
- "Aerial Photography and Multisensor Imagery." The Symposium on Information Technology and Emergency Management. May 4–6, 1988.
- "Genetrix – The Intelligence Balloon." Military Intelligence. January–March 1989.
- "The Impact and Social Implications of Commercial Remote Sensing Satellites." Technology in Society. Vol. II, No. 1. 1989.
- "The Serendipity Effect of Aerial Reconnaissance." Interdisciplinary Science Review. March 1989.
- "The Kyshtym Connection." The Bulletin of the Atomic Scientists. March 1990.
- "Operation ‘Drybeef.’" Men of the 57th. Summer 1990.
- "The Meanest Bushwhacker." Blue and Gray Magazine. June 1991.
- "Space Satellite Photographs: Whose Pictures Are They Anyway?" Address to MIT Communications Forum. November 7, 1991.
- "Antoine de Saint Exupery: Reconnaissance Pilot Par Excellence." American Intelligence Journal. Winter/Spring 1992.
- "The Invasion of Cuba." MHQ. Winter 1992.
- "Imagery Intelligence." International Military and Defense Encyclopedia. 1992.
- "Reconnaissance and Surveillance." International Military and Defense Encyclopedia. 1992.
- "Too Close to Nuclear Conflict." The Washington Post. February 8, 1992.
- "Remarks for Receiving Award for Outstanding Achievement." Foreign Intelligence Literary Scene. Vol. II, No. 3. 1992.
- "A Salute to Lundahl’s Legacy of Excellence." NPIC Update. June 1992.
- "Chalk Up Another Chicken." U.S. Naval Institute Proceedings. October 1992.
- "Ornery." Men of the 57th. Spring 1993.
- "Images of Anguish." Fredericksburg Free-Lance Star. April 24, 1993.
- "Life in the CCC." Fredericksburg Free-Lance Star. May 15, 1993.
- "A Legacy of Excellence." Studies in Intelligence. Spring 1994.
- "Could D-Day Be Kept Secret Now?" Newsday. May 10, 1994.
- "Photo Reconnaissance at Tarawa." Lecture. Naval Historical Center. August 11, 1994.
- "Memorial Address, Arthur C. Lundahl." Photogrammetry Engineering and Remote Sensing. July 1995.
- "The Veteran’s Angel." The GW Magazine. Fall 1995.
- "The Art and Science of Photoreconnaissance." Scientific American. March 1996.
- "Arthur C. Lundahl: Founder of the Image Exploitation Discipline." Corona between the Sun and the Earth: The First NRO Reconnaissance Eye in Space. Co-Author with Frederick J. Doyle. Bethesda: American Society for Photogrammetry and Remote Sensing. 159–166.
- "Secret Air Missions." World Intelligence Review. May/June 1997.
- "The Evolution of Aerial and Spatial Reconnaissance." Address, U.S. Air Force Museum. March 17, 1998.
- "Recalling Favorites." The GW Magazine. Fall 1998.
- "If You Can’t See It, You Can’t Hit It." Air Power History. Winter 1998.
- "Bootlegging Thrived Here During Prohibition Days," Fredericksburg Free-Lance-Star. September 1, 2007.
- "The Aerial Photos of the Auschwitz-Birkenau Extermination Complex." The Bombing of Auschwitz: Should the Allies Have Attempted It? Michael J. Neufeld and Michael Berenbaum, eds. New York: St. Martin's Press, 2000. 52–57.
- "The Cuban Missile Crisis Revisited." Fredericksburg Free-Lance Star. January 25, 2003.
- "The Effects of Aerial and Satellite Imagery on the 1973 Yom Kippur War." Air Power History. Fall 2004.
- "Focusing Attention on Geospatial Security Needs." Imaging Notes. Spring 2007.
- "Bootlegging Thrived Here during Prohibition." Fredericksburg Free-Lance Star. September 1, 2007.
