= USNS Observation Island =

Mariner-class merchant ship

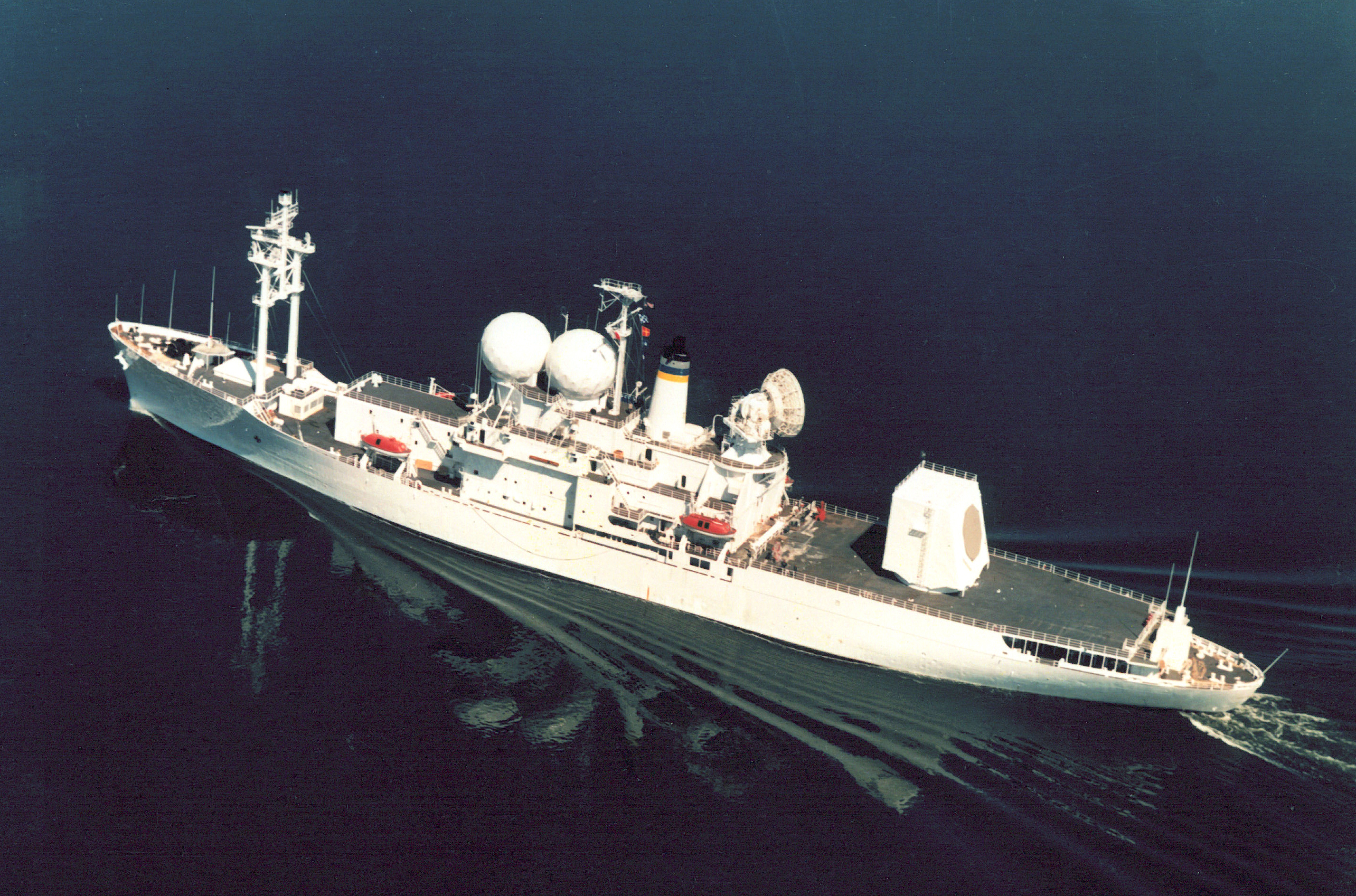
- USNS Observation Island (T-AGM-23) c.2006.

History

United States
- Name: Observation Island
- Namesake: An island in the southern section of Lake Okeechobee, Florida
- Awarded: 1 June 1951
- Builder: New York Shipbuilding Corporation
- Yard number: 494
- Laid down: 15 September 1952
- Launched: 15 August 1953
- Sponsored by: Mrs. Samuel C. Waugh
- Acquired: 24 February 1954
- Commissioned: 15 December 1958
- Decommissioned: 1 January 1972
- In service: 1 July 1977
- Out of service: 25 March 2014
- Stricken: 31 March 2014
- Home port: None
- Identification: IMO number: 8835449; MMSI number: 367213000; Callsign: NRPP
- Fate: Scrapped 9 May 2018

General characteristics
- Class & type: AMG 53
- Displacement: approx. 17,015 tons (17,288 t)
- Length: 564 ft (172 m)
- Beam: 76 ft (23 m)
- Draft: 28.58333 ft (8.71220 m)
- Installed power: Two boilers; 1 GE turbine; 19,250 hp (14.35 MW)
- Propulsion: Single screw
- Speed: 20 knots (37 km/h)
- Capacity: Officers: 92; Enlisted: 465
- Complement: 65 civilians; 20 Navy personnel; 35 technicians
- Sensors & processing systems: AN/SPQ-11 Cobra Judy
- Notes: MARAD C4-S-1 A

USNS Observation Island (T-AGM-23) was built as the Mariner-class merchant ship Empire State Mariner for the United States Maritime Commission, launched 15 August 1953, and operated by United States Lines upon delivery on 24 February 1954, making voyages for the Military Sea Transportation Service (MSTS) until going into reserve at Mobile, Alabama on 9 November 1954.

Title was transferred to the United States Navy on 10 September 1956 and, after conversion, the ship was renamed Observation Island. On commissioning the ship was classified as the "experimental miscellaneous auxiliary" (EAG), USS Observation Island (EAG-154) supporting fleet ballistic missile development. Observation Island was the platform for the first at-sea firing of the Polaris missile in 1959. On 1 April 1968, Observation Island was redesignated as a miscellaneous auxiliary USS Observation Island (AG-154). She was the platform for the first at-sea firing of the Poseidon missile in 1969.

Observation Island was decommissioned and placed in reserve from 1972 until 1977 in the Suisun Bay Reserve Fleet until withdrawn and then returned in 1978. The ship was permanently withdrawn April 1979 and placed in service with MSTS successor, the Military Sealift Command (MSC).

The ship was classified in 1979 as the missile range instrumentation ship USNS Observation Island (T-AGM-23). Observation Island operated worldwide and monitored compliance with strategic arms treaties and supported U.S. military weapons test programs. Observation Island carried the United States Air Force AN/SPQ-11 Cobra Judy passive electronically scanned array radar system for collecting data on missile tests. The ship was operated by MSC for the Air Force Technical Applications Center at Patrick Air Force Base.

The ship served the MSC until her inactivation 25 March 2014 after her mission was taken over by USNS Howard O. Lorenzen.

== As Empire State Mariner ==
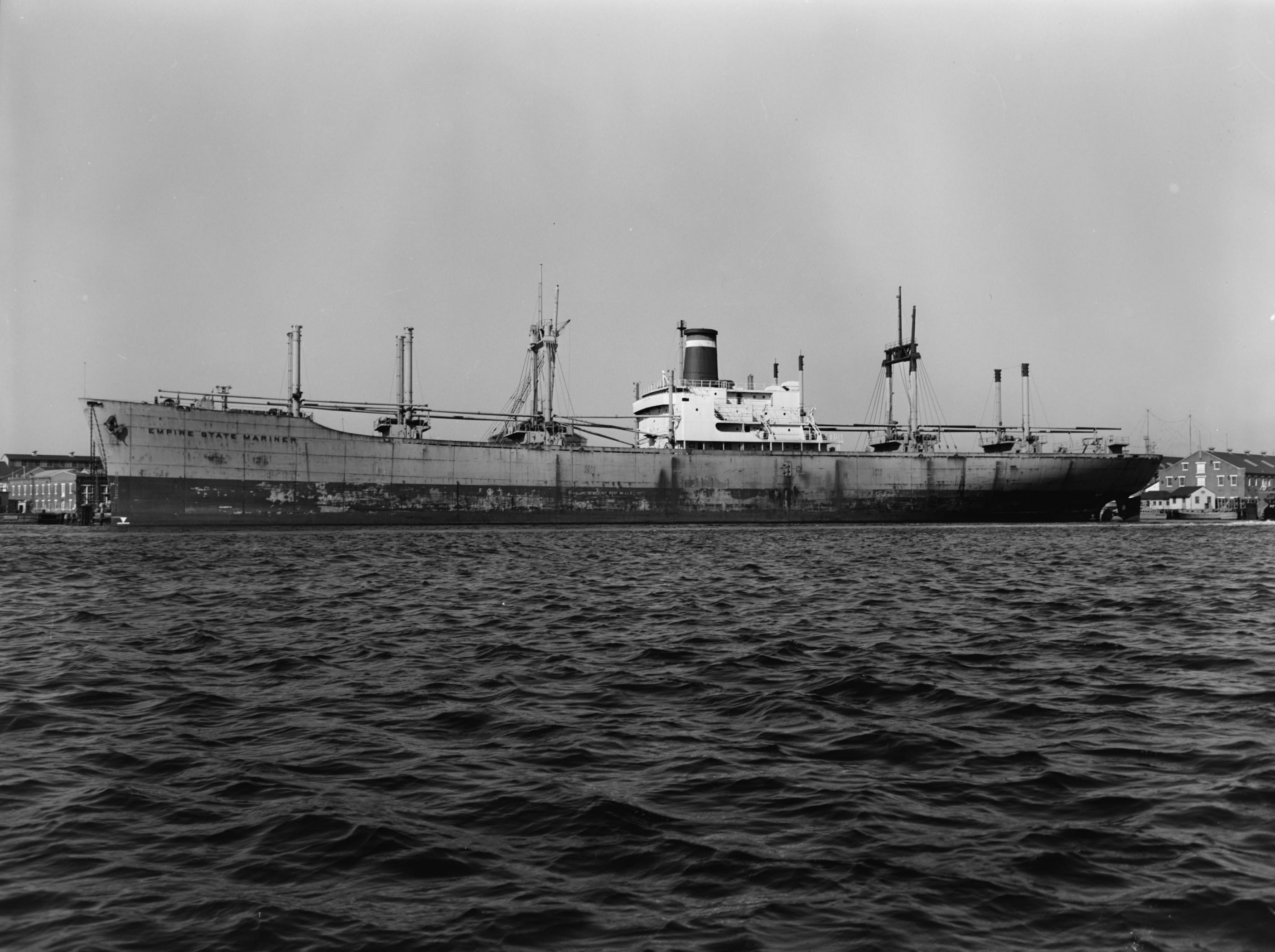
Empire State Mariner in harbor, c.1954.

Empire State Mariner was laid down as a Type C4 / Mariner-class high speed cargo ship 15 September 1952 by the New York Shipbuilding Corporation, Camden, New Jersey; launched as Empire State Mariner 15 August 1953; sponsored by Mrs. Samuel C. Waugh; and delivered to the Maritime Administration and the United States Lines for operation under General Agency Agreement 24 February 1954.

Empire State Mariner, Capt. V. R. Arkin, Master, made three voyages for Military Sea Transportation Service. The first two took her to Bremerhaven and Liverpool. The third, commencing in May 1954, took her along both the east and west coasts, as well as to the Panama Canal Zone, Guam, Korea, and Japan. She returned to Mobile, Alabama in September 1954, and entered the National Defense Reserve Fleet 9 November 1954.

Empire State Mariner transferred to the Navy 10 September 1956 with three other Mariner class ships.

== US Navy service history ==
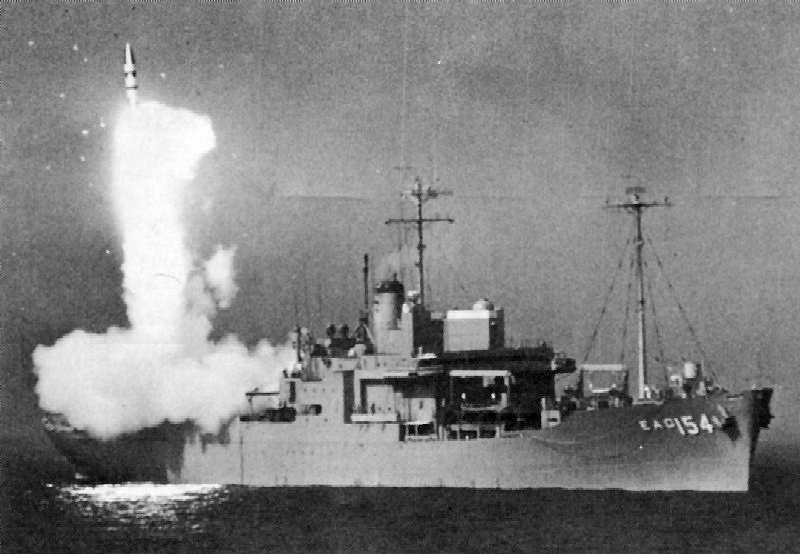
Observation Island firing Polaris A-3 test missile.

Her conversion to the first naval ship having a fully integrated Fleet Ballistic Missile System was authorized 15 October 1957, and partial completion of the project was accomplished at Norfolk Naval Shipyard, Portsmouth, Virginia. before she commissioned 5 December 1958 as Observation Island (EAG-154).

During the conversion, there were no major hull or engineering changes made other than installation of a roll stabilization system. However, extensive alterations were accomplished in the superstructure and hold areas so as to accommodate the Fleet Ballistic Missile (FBM) Weapons System. Observation Island departed her homeport of Norfolk 3 January 1959, underwent shakedown at Guantanamo Bay, and then operated on the Atlantic Missile Range off Cape Canaveral, conducting dummy missile launches and communications tests.

In March 1959, Observation Island returned to Norfolk Naval Shipyard for installation of additional equipment, including the Ships Inertial Navigation System (SINS). In June she steamed for her new homeport, Port Canaveral, Florida, and made preparations for the first at-sea launch of a Polaris missile. Designated UGM-27, the missile was successfully launched from Observation Island 27 August 1959.

Following this milestone, Observation Island returned to Norfolk Naval Shipyard for installation of a fire control system to enable her to launch more sophisticated guided versions of new generation Polaris missiles. She also received a new launcher, the developmental prototype of those installed in the ballistic missile submarines.

This work was completed in January 1960 and Observation Island returned to Port Canaveral to continue Polaris test launch operations. After a total of six launchings, the ship commenced support of Polaris launchings from submarines. She provided optical and electronic data gathering services, and acted as communications relay station between submerged submarines and the supervisor of range operations at the Cape. The first successful fully guided Polaris missile launching from a submerged submarine took place 20 July 1960 from USS George Washington (SSBN-598). Through October Observation Island also supported launches from USS Patrick Henry (SSBN-599).

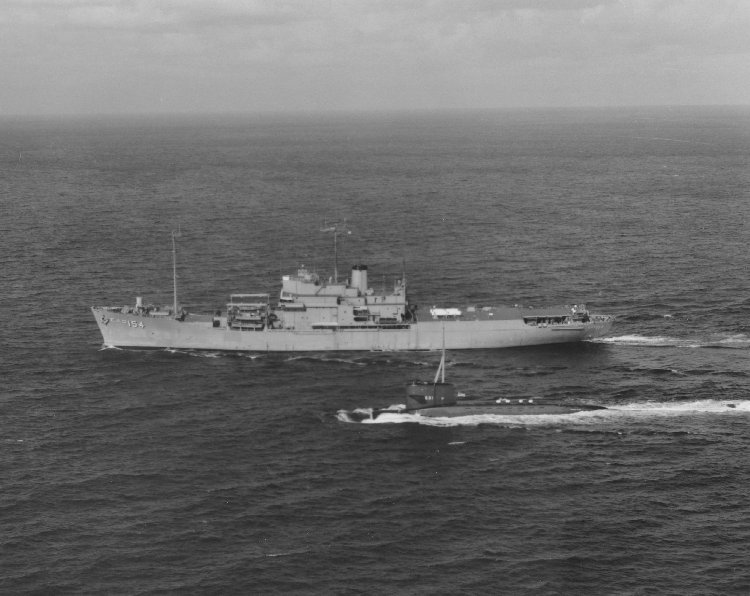
USS Observation Island and USS Robert E. Lee (SSBN-601) in the 1960s.

Following further modifications at Norfolk Naval Shipyard in the fall of 1960, Observation Island returned to Port Canaveral in December to continue fleet ballistic missile support work and systems test and evaluation. She received the Navy Unit Commendation 15 December; launched the new A-2 Polaris 1 March 1961; and supported the first submerged A-2 launch from USS Ethan Allen (SSBN-608) 23 October 1961.

In late 1961, Observation Island served as a survey ship on the Atlantic Missile Range, and in January 1962 she again put in at Norfolk Naval Shipyard, this time for modifications preparatory to launching the new A-3 Polaris. Returning to Port Canaveral in March, she supported ballistic missile submarines through the following autumn, when she steamed for two months of operations on the Pacific Missile Range.

Observation Island was back at Port Canaveral by Christmas 1962, and until June 1963 she expanded her role of oceanographic survey in the Atlantic Range. She conducted the first successful at-sea launches of the A-3 Polaris 17 and 21 June. President John F. Kennedy came on board 16 November 1963 to observe a Polaris launch, six days before his assassination.

Observation Island was redesignated AG-154 on 1 April 1968. She commenced an extensive ten month conversion 24 June at Norfolk Naval Shipyard in preparation for support of the Poseidon C-3 missile program. The summer of 1969 found her once again at Port Canaveral, ready to resume experimental missile launchings, to assist in the training of submarine crews, to assist in ballistic missile submarine shakedown operations at Cape Kennedy, and to support other important phases of the development and deployment of the fleet ballistic missile weapons system.

While the Observation Island was stationed at Port Canaveral, adjacent to NASA at Cape Kennedy, Florida, the week Apollo 11 was launched from the Cape, the ship also made history by beginning its mission to achieve the first successful at-sea firing of the Poseidon missile. The commendation was earned by the 1969 crew and was awarded in 1971 while the ship was stationed at Pearl Harbor, Hawaii for various range survey duties. The success of the mission earned the ship and crew the Meritorious Unit Commendation from the Secretary of the Navy.

The Navy Meritorious Unit Commendation can be awarded to a unit that has performed service of a character comparable to that which would merit a Bronze Star in a combat situation, or an equivalent award in a non-combat situation to an individual.

Observation Island was decommissioned by the US Navy 1 January 1972 and transferred to the Maritime Administration.

== Military Sealift Command service ==
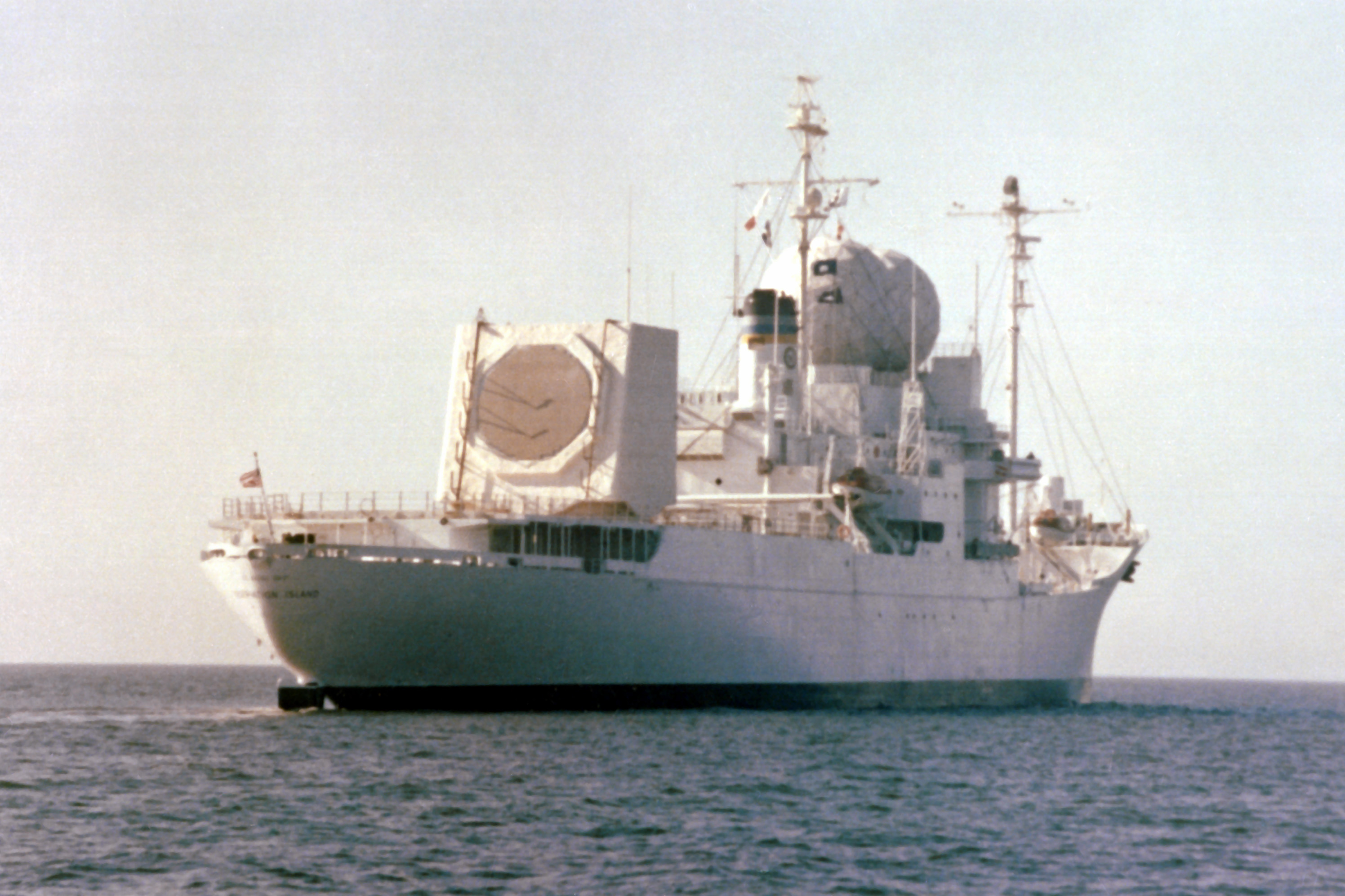
Aft view of the USNS Observation Island showing the location of the Cobra Judy array.

18 August 1977 Observation Island was transferred to the Military Sealift Command at the request of the United States Air Force for use as a tracking ship designated USNS Observation Island (T-AGM 23). The ship underwent a number of modifications including the installation of the AN/SPQ-11 Cobra Judy passive electronically scanned array radar which was used for verification of strategic arms treaties. In the 31 years that followed, the ship averaged 260 days a year at sea in support of this monitoring mission.

In 2008, the USNS Observation Island was part of Operation Burnt Frost, the U.S. government program that used a RIM-161 Standard Missile 3 anti-ballistic missile to shoot down the satellite, USA-193.

== Fate ==
USNS Howard O. Lorenzen (T-AGM-25) was delivered in January 2012 and replaced USNS Observation Island, which was to be removed from service on 1 April 2014. Observation Island was inactivated 25 March 2014 and was stricken from the Naval Vessel Register 31 March 2014. Observation Island was turned over to the Maritime Administration and towed by USNS Grapple (T-ARS-53) to Beaumont Reserve Fleet, Beaumont, Texas. The ship was observed by a drone operator on 9 May 2018 being towed to Brownsville, TX for scrapping at All Star Metals.

== Awards ==
Observation Island has been awarded the following honors:

- Navy Unit Commendation with star
- Navy Meritorious Unit Commendation with two stars
- Navy E Ribbon, four awards
- National Defense Service Medal with two stars
- Armed Forces Expeditionary Medal

== See also ==
- USNS Invincible (T-AGM-24)
