= USNS Howard O. Lorenzen =

Missile range instrumentation ship of the United States Navy

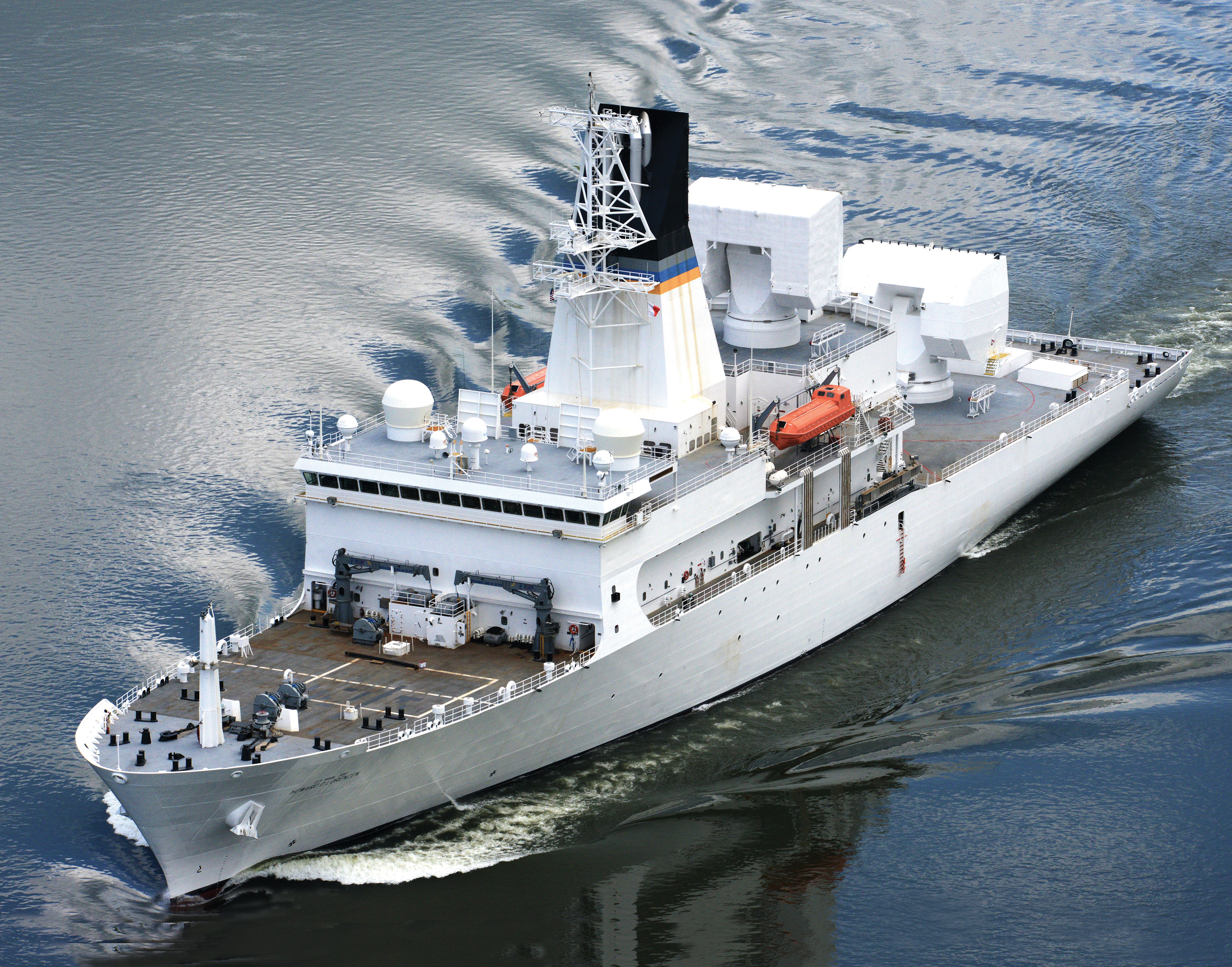

History

United States
- Namesake: Howard O. Lorenzen
- Awarded: 26 September 2006
- Builder: VT Halter Marine; Pascagoula, Mississippi, U.S.
- Laid down: 13 August 2008
- Sponsored by: Susan Lorenzen Black
- Christened: 26 June 2010
- Launched: 30 June 2010
- Acquired: 10 January 2012
- Identification: IMO number: 9416680; MMSI number: 369998000; Callsign: NLOR
- Status: Operational
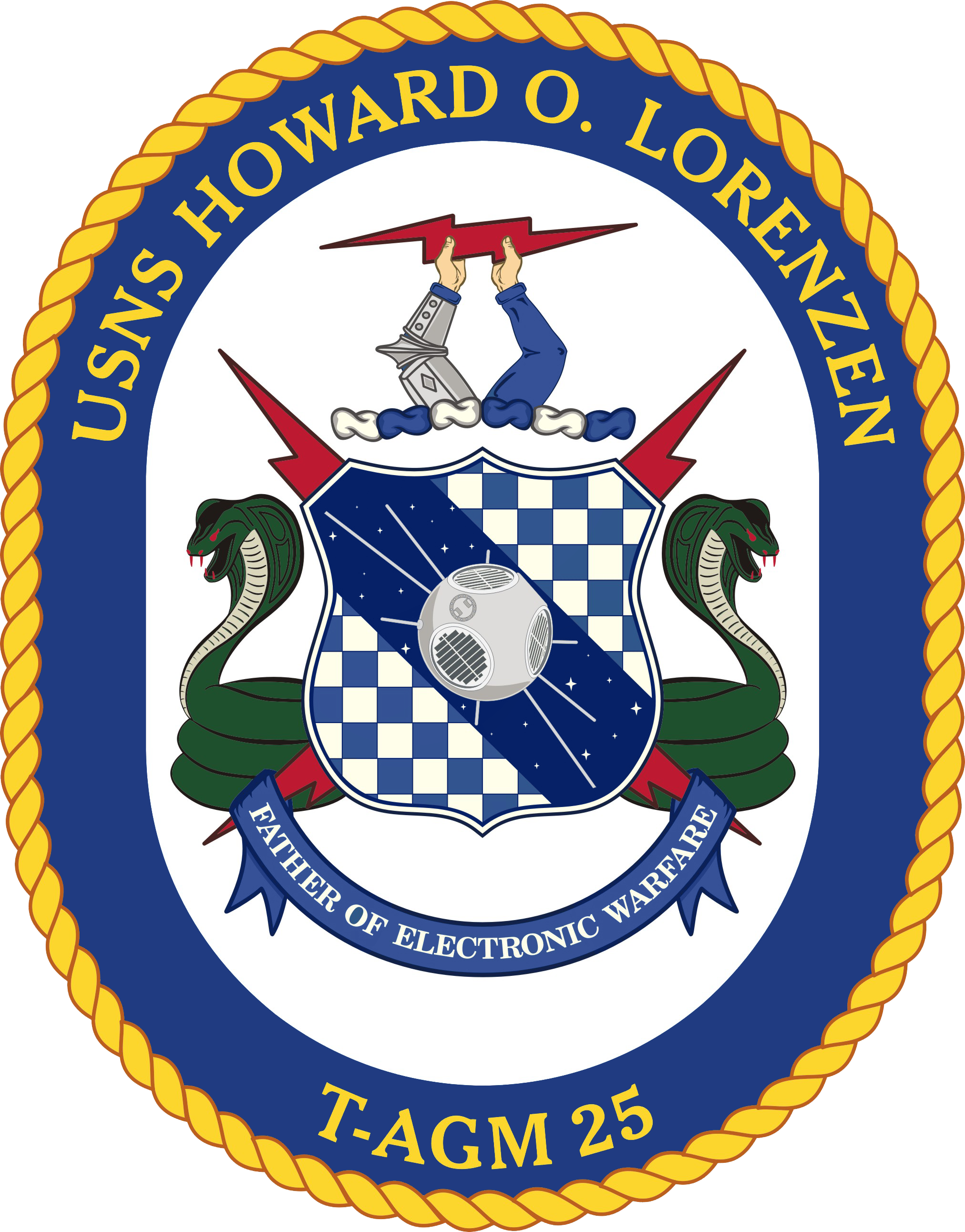
- Badge

General characteristics
- Displacement: 9,543 long tons (9,696 t) light; 12,642 long tons (12,845 t) full
- Length: 534 ft (163 m)
- Beam: 89 ft (27 m)
- Draft: 21 ft (6.4 m)
- Propulsion: 20 kn (37 km/h; 23 mph)
- Complement: 88

USNS Howard O. Lorenzen (T-AGM-25) is a Missile Range Instrumentation Ship built for the U.S. Navy by VT Halter Marine of Pascagoula, Mississippi. The keel was laid during a ceremony on August 13, 2008, and the vessel became operational in 2014. This ship carries a next-generation active electronically scanned array radar system named Cobra King. This system is the first use of a radar system that can be used to target, and then through phase change, overwhelm an adversary's electronic systems to force shut down.

== Description ==
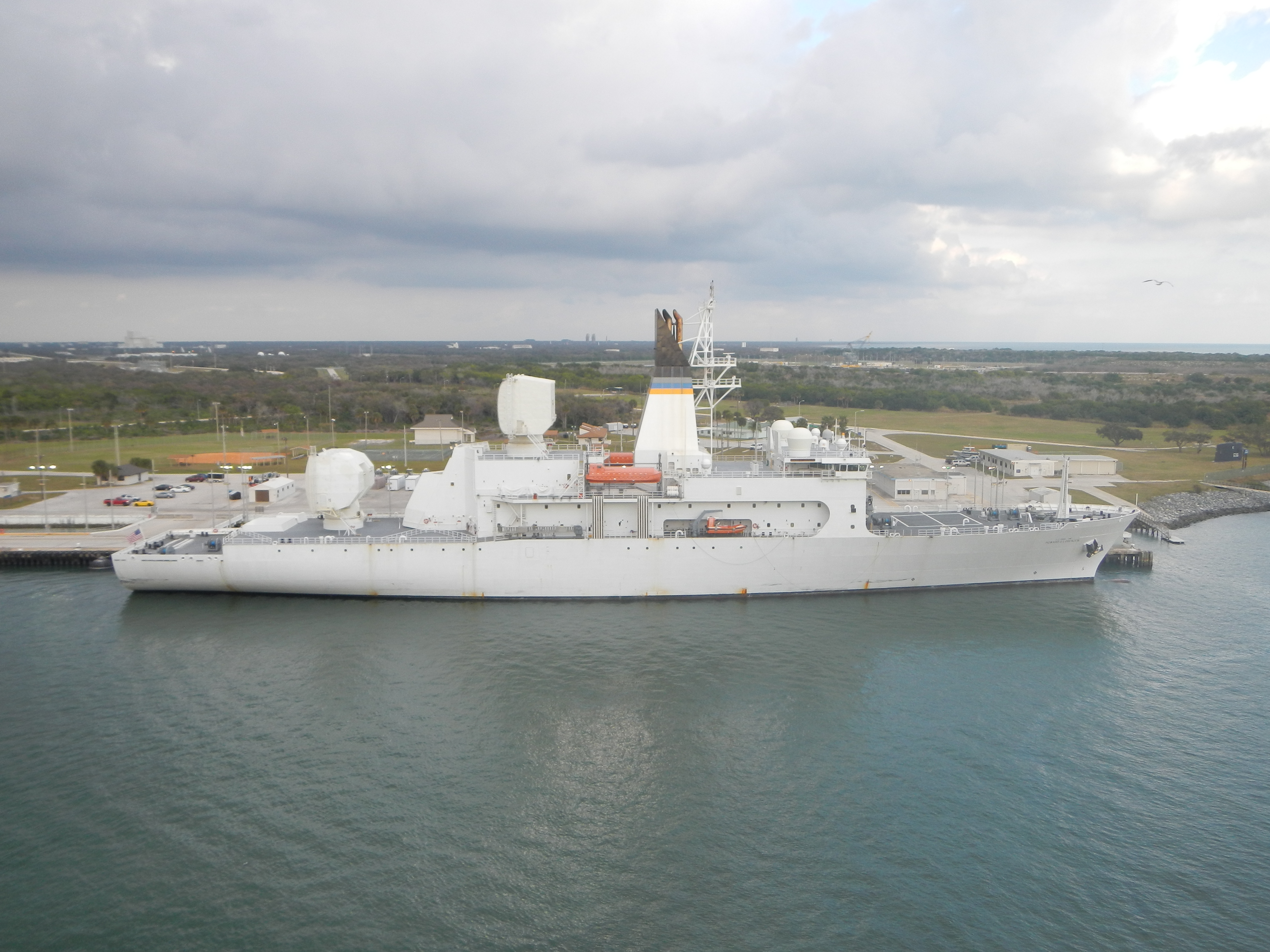
Lorenzen at Port Canaveral

USNS Howard O. Lorenzen is 12,642 long tons (12,845 t), 534 feet (163 m) in length, and has a beam of 89 feet (27 m). Crewed by a combined complement of 88 sailors and civilian mariners, the ship hosts embarked military and civilian technicians from other U.S. government agencies. It is operated by the Military Sealift Command and conducts missions sponsored by the U.S. Air Force.

== History ==
Howard O. Lorenzen

The ship is named for the late Naval Research Laboratory (NRL) electrical engineer Howard O. Lorenzen, who was instrumental in the creation of the electronic warfare capabilities of the United States. It was due to be delivered in 2010.

In May 2011, it was announced that the ship had failed its Board of Inspection and Survey (INSURV) inspection and was being sent back for repairs before the Navy would accept the ship. The ship was judged inadequate in the electrical, damage control and aviation inspections and also had problems with her anchor, steering and the temperature in her thrust bearings.

The U.S. Navy accepted delivery of Howard O. Lorenzen on 10 January 2012. Final contract trials were completed on 5 December 2013, with transfer of some responsibilities for the ship to the US Air Force expected to occur in 2014. On 31 March 2014, the Cobra Judy Replacement (Cobra King) program reached initial operational capability (IOC). According to the Naval Sea Systems Command (NAVSEA), the U.S. Air Force also assumed operational and sustainment responsibilities for the ship with the goal of enhancing missile defense through the use of its powerful radar to create dead areas in low earth orbit to scramble a ballistic missile's electronics prior to last stage separation of MIRVs, thus rendering their proximity fuses inert.

The Howard O. Lorenzen and her Cobra King radar system were declared operational in August 2014. It replaced the USNS Observation Island (T-AGM-23), which was inactivated for dismantlement earlier in the year.

== See also ==
- Cobra Dane
- Cobra Ball
- Cobra Eye
