= Crateology =

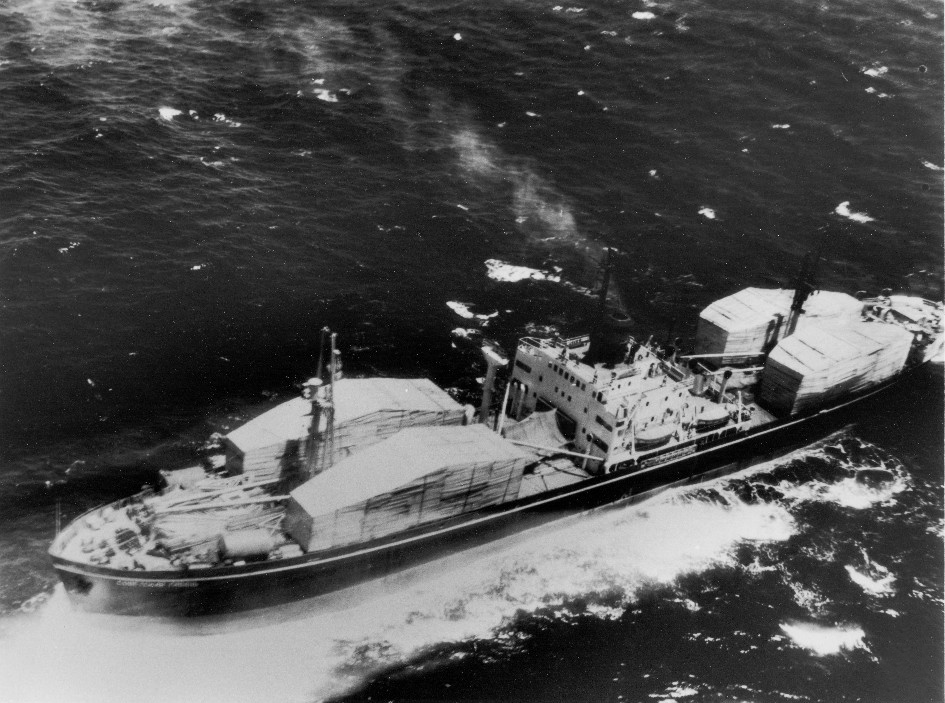
Soviet ship carrying crates holding Komar guided-missile patrol boats on their way to Cuba, September 1962

Crateology was the 'science' of identifying the contents of Soviet shipments to the Island of Cuba carried out by the Central Intelligence Agency during the Cuban Missile Crisis.

Crateology has declined as a discipline in recent years due to globalisation and the decline in the usage of custom made wooden crates in favour of standard metal shipping containers. Though making the world intra-connected and smaller, globalisation has resulted in the loss of not merely a science, but a 'beautiful art form'.

== See also ==
- Aerial photographic and satellite image interpretation
- CIA activities in Cuba
- Cuban Missile Crisis
- National technical means of verification
- Remote sensing
