= AN/SPQ-11 =

US Navy PESA space and missile tracking radar

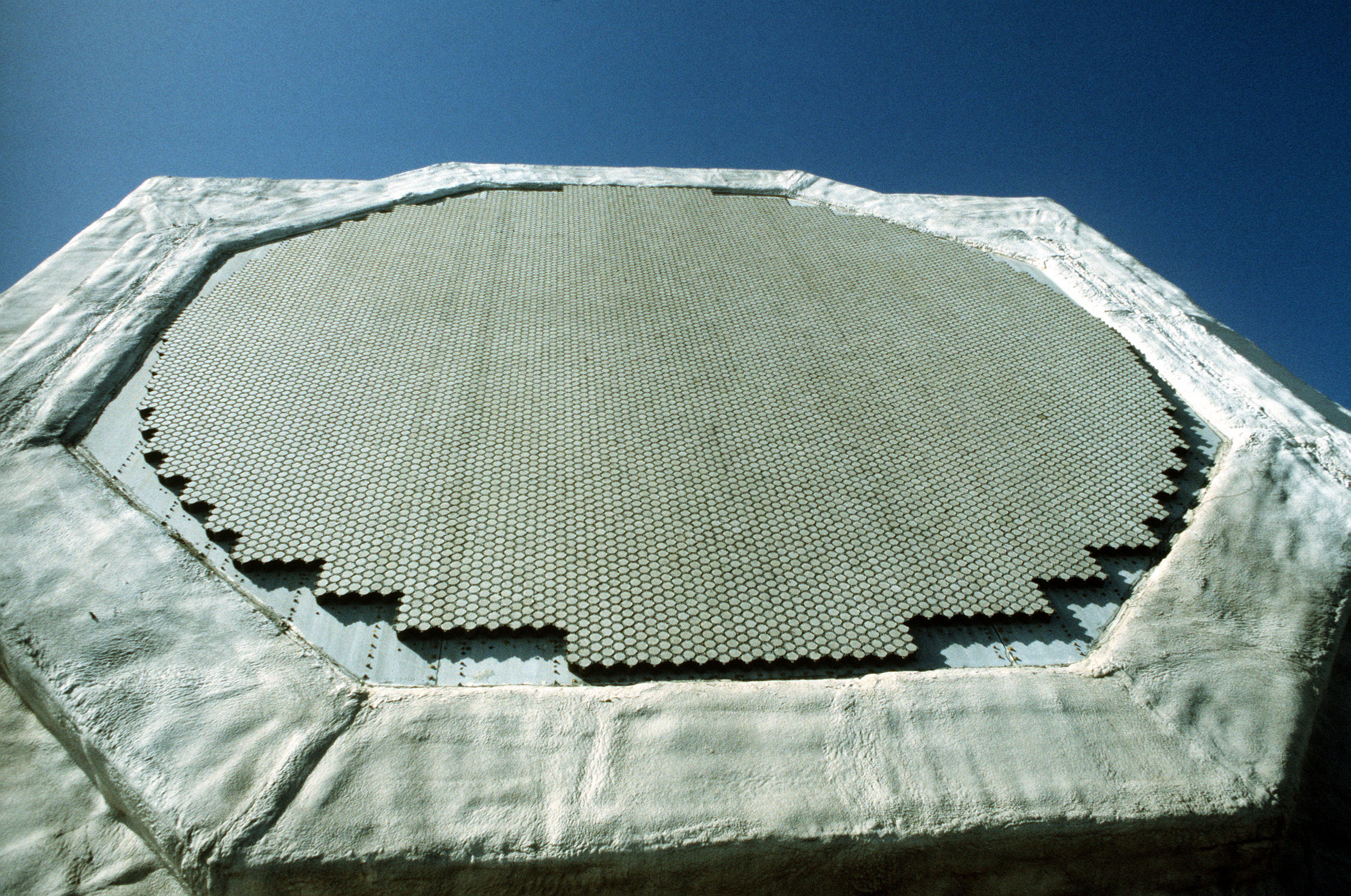
- Close-up of the front of Cobra Judy radar, 1983
- Country of origin: United States
- Introduced: 1983
- No. built: 1
- Type: Passive electronically scanned array radar
- Frequency: 2900–3100 MHz (E\F band)

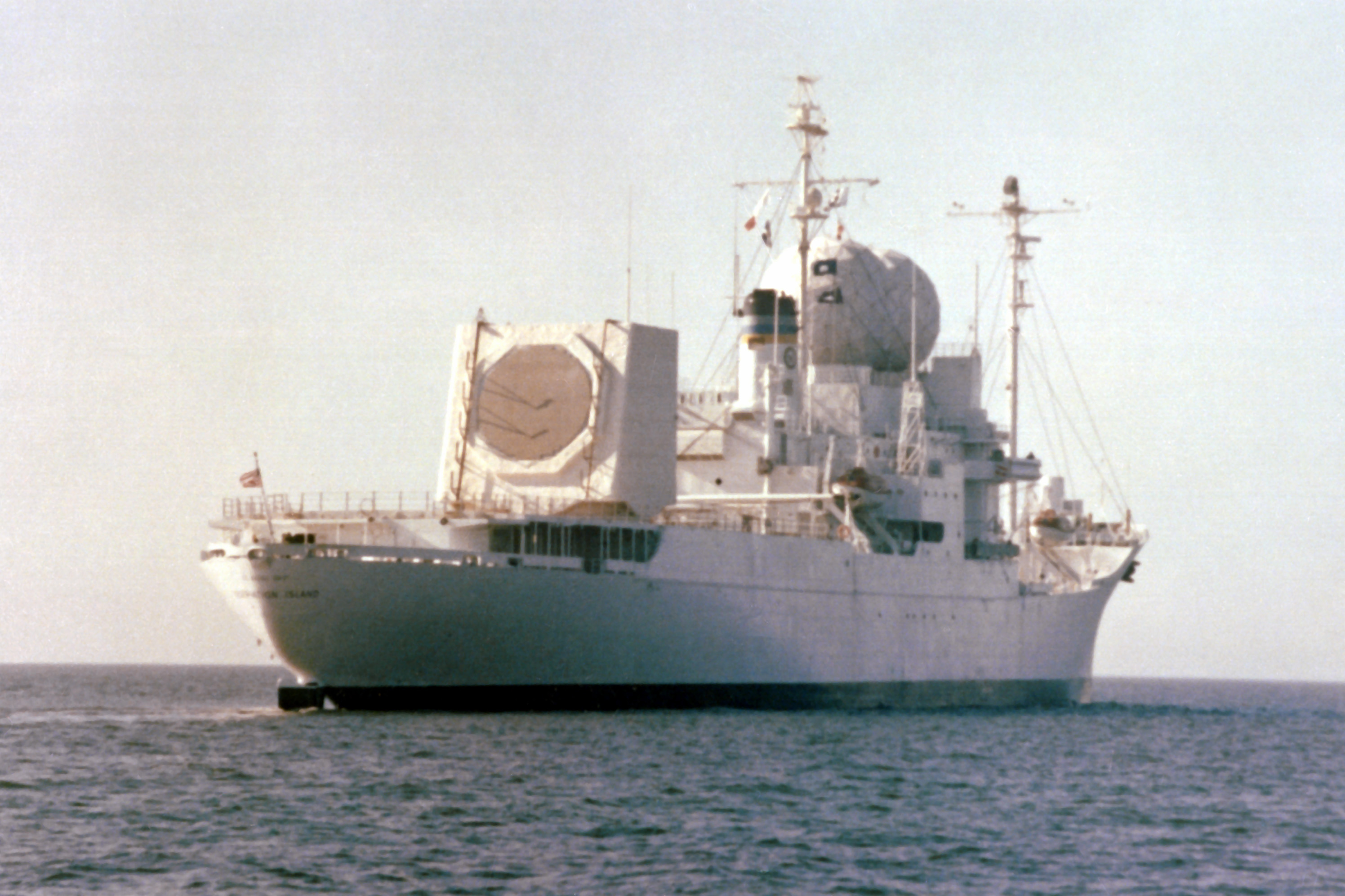
Aft view of USNS Observation Island showing the location of the Cobra Judy array.

The AN/SPQ-11 Cobra Judy was a passive electronically scanned array (PESA) radar installed on the USNS Observation Island (T-AGM-23) missile range instrumentation ship.

It was used for space tracking, ballistic missiles tracking and other instrumentation. Cobra Judy was the US Air Force code name for the afloat phased-array radar designed with the primary mission of monitoring Soviet missile tests operating in conjunction with land based phased-array radar Cobra Dane and Cobra Ball aircraft. Cobra Judy was replaced by the Cobra Judy Replacement (CJR) project in April 2014.

In accordance with the Joint Electronics Type Designation System (JETDS), the "AN/SPQ-11" designation represents the 11th design of an Army-Navy electronic device for surface ship special radar system. The JETDS system also now is used to name all Department of Defense electronic systems.

== Replacement ==
The original Cobra Judy platform, USNS Observation Island, was taken out of service and stricken from the Naval Vessel Register 31 March 2014. The same day, the Cobra Judy Replacement program whose radars are called Cobra King, reached initial operating capability (IOC) aboard USNS Howard O. Lorenzen (T-AGM-25). USNS Howard O. Lorenzen, together with her Cobra King radar system, were declared operational in August 2014. According to Naval Sea Systems Command (NAVSEA), the US Air Force also assumed operational and sustainment responsibilities for the ship. The inertial navigation system for the antenna stabilization and alignment had been provided by iMAR Navigation GmbH. Raytheon manufactures and maintains the CJR's X and S-band radars.

== See also ==
- RC-135X Cobra Eye
- List of radars
- List of military electronics of the United States
