= Cobra Dane =

US radar installation for monitoring Soviet missile tests

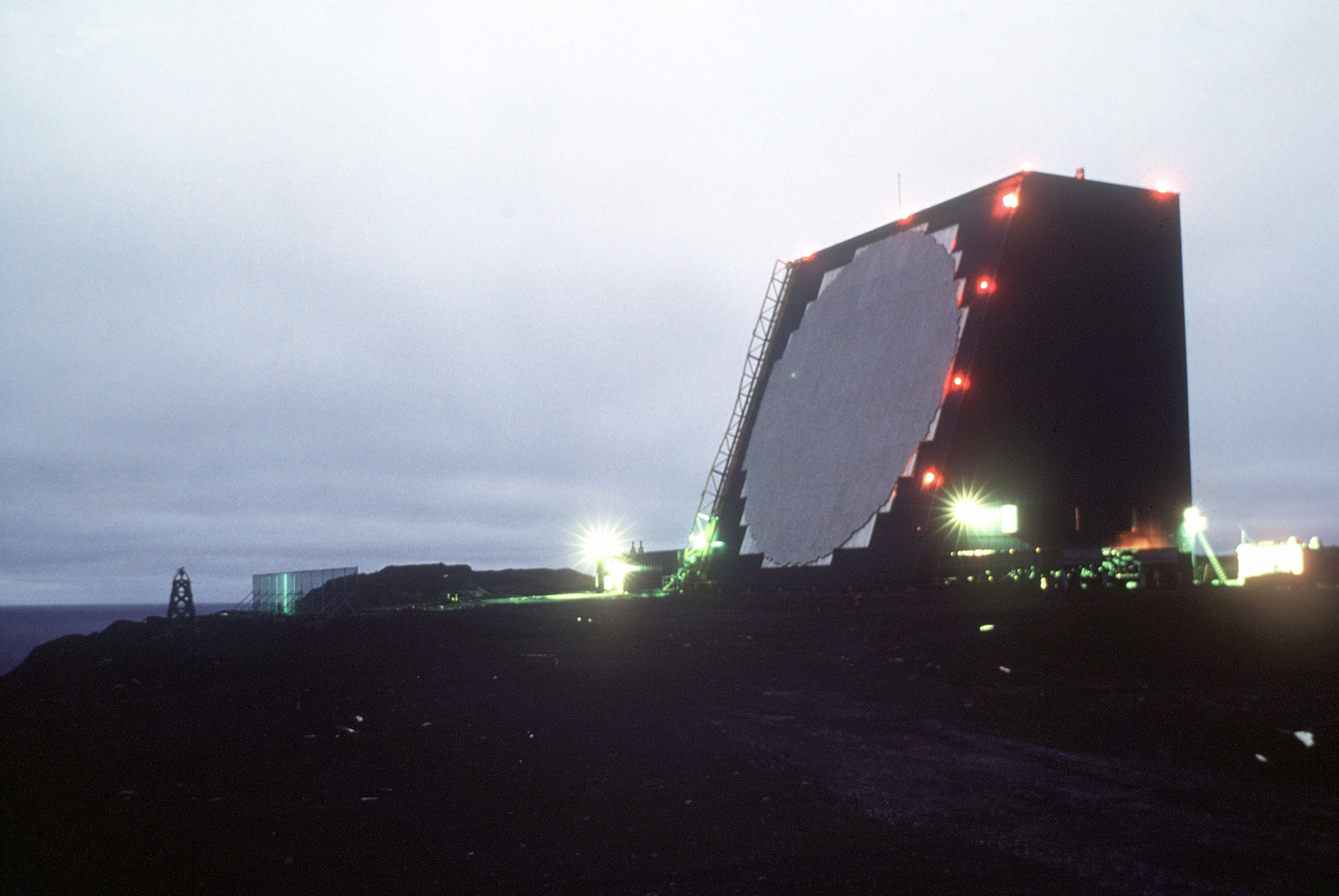
Night view of the COBRA DANE radar

The AN/FPS-108 COBRA DANE is a PESA phased array radar installation operated by Raytheon for the United States Space Force (originally for the United States Air Force) at Eareckson Air Station on the island of Shemya, Aleutian Islands, Alaska. The system was built in 1976 and brought online in 1977 for the primary mission of gathering intelligence about Russia's ICBM program in support of verification of the SALT II arms limitation treaty. Its single face 95 ft (29 m) diameter phased array radar antenna 52.7373°N 174.0914°E faces the Kamchatka Peninsula and Russia's Kura Test Range. COBRA DANE operates in the 1215–1400 MHz band and can track items as small as a basketball sized drone at distances of several hundred miles.

The "COBRA" designation indicates a general Defense Intelligence program and, in accordance with the Joint Electronics Type Designation System, the "AN/FPS-108" designation represents the 108th design of an Army-Navy fixed radar (pulsed) electronic device for searching.

== Description ==
It initially employed a Control Data Corporation Cyber 74 mainframe computer for data processing. Data from the radar is sent to the North American Aerospace Defense Command (NORAD) at Peterson Space Force Base, Colorado. It is also listed as a partner of the NASA Orbital Debris Program Office and works with the Missile Defense Agency, under the control of the 21st Operations Group.

The Cobra Dane radar has been upgraded to be integrated in the Missile Defense Agency's (MDA) Ballistic Missile Defense System (BMDS). The improvement includes midcourse BMDS sensor coverage by providing acquisition, tracking, object classification, and data that can be used for cueing, launch of interceptor missiles, and course updates of interceptors while retaining the site's legacy intelligence and space track missions. The Space Force maintains responsibility for the Cobra Dane radar operations, maintenance, and sustainment.

== Technical specifications ==
- Traveling wave tube l-fed phased-array, all-weather, long-range radar
- Provides midcourse coverage for the Ballistic Missile Defense System. Detects sea-launched or intercontinental ballistic missiles; Classifies reentry vehicles and other missile objects. Provides real-time information to Fire Control.
- Provides tracking of threat ballistic missiles sufficiently accurate to commit the launch of interceptors and to update the target tracks to the interceptor while the interceptor is in flight
- Has one radar face providing 136° of azimuth coverage. The radar face is approximately 95 feet (29 metres) in diameter; overall radar height is 120 feet (37 metres). Detects objects out to 2,000 miles (3,200 kilometres). It operates in the L-band frequency.

== See also ==
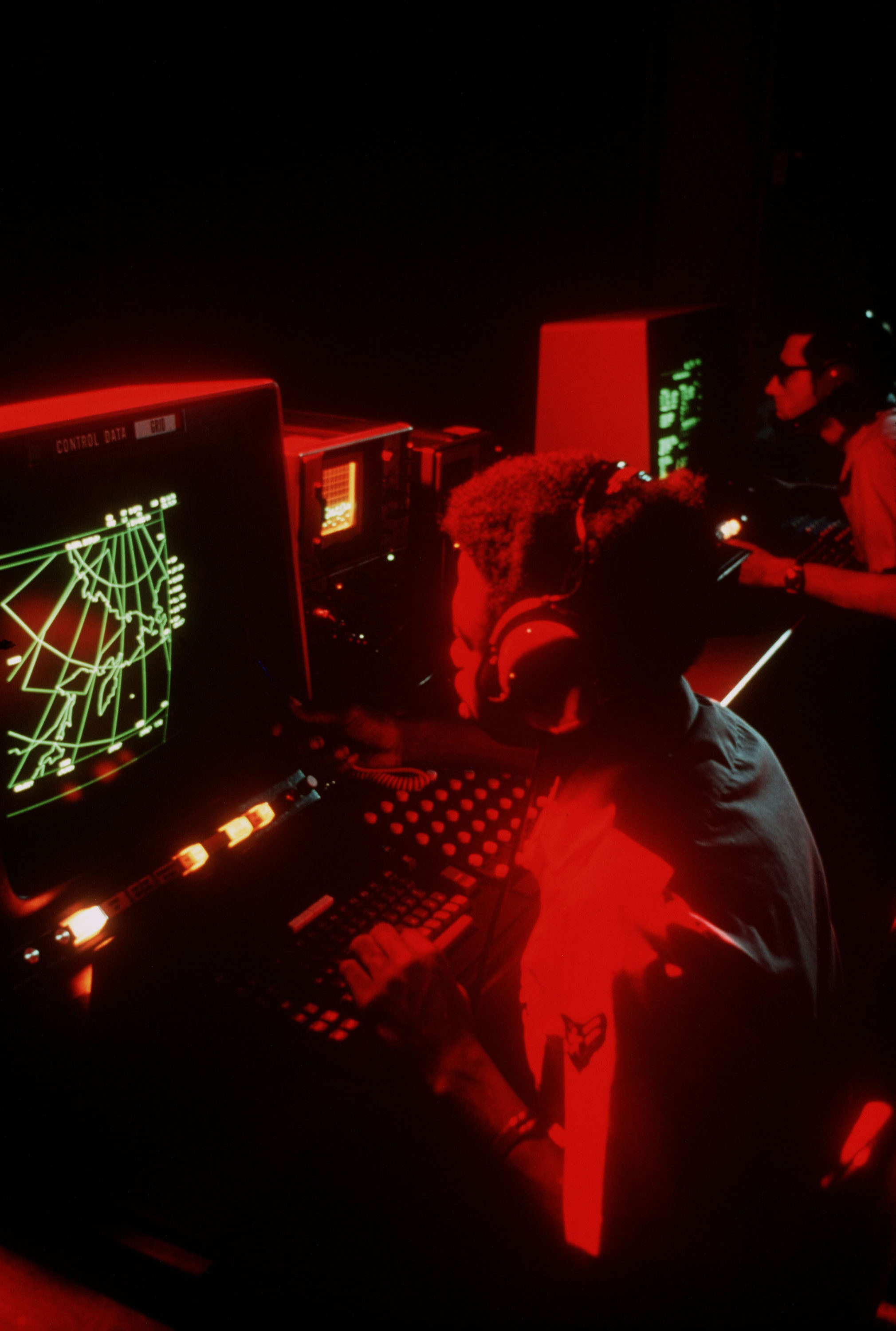
Displays for the COBRA DANE system, 1977

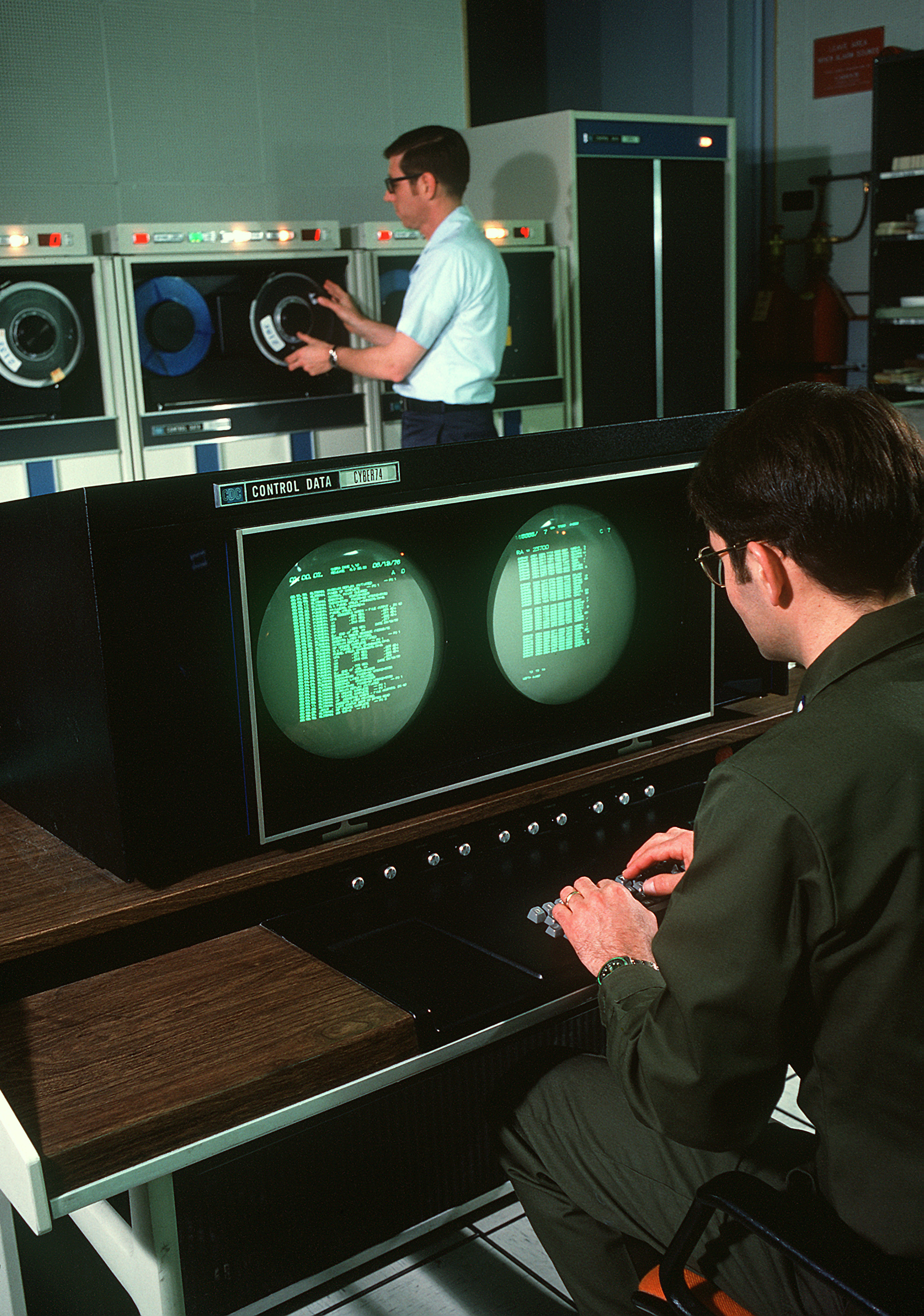
Personnel inside the data processing center, June 1977

- Cobra Ball
- Cobra Eye
- AN/SPQ-11 Cobra Judy
- PAVE PAWS
- BMEWS
- Eareckson Air Station, Shemya island, Alaska
- Specific US radar and locations
  - Thule Air Base, Greenland
  - Clear Space Force Station, Alaska
  - RAF Fylingdales, United Kingdom
  - Cape Cod Space Force Station, Massachusetts
  - Beale Air Force Base, California
  - Cavalier Air Force Station, North Dakota
- List of radars
- List of military electronics of the United States
