= Planning of the September 11 attacks =

Plot by al-Qaeda to attack the U.S.

In the United States on September 11, 2001 (9/11), 19 terrorists from al-Qaeda hijacked four airplanes in an attempt to crash them into landmarks that symbolized American political and economic power. American Airlines Flight 11 and United Airlines Flight 175 crashed into the World Trade Center, and American Airlines Flight 77 was crashed into the Pentagon. United Airlines Flight 93 was intended to be crashed likely into the U.S. Capitol or White House, but the hijackers intentionally crashed it into a field in Pennsylvania instead, due to a passenger revolt.

Initially, al-Qaeda official Khalid Sheikh Mohammed planned to bomb multiple airliners departing Asia for the U.S. in 1995; the plot was foiled by Manila police before it was enacted. In 1996, he redesigned the plan, wanting nine U.S. airliners to be crashed into U.S. landmarks; al-Qaeda's leader, Osama bin Laden, rejected the plan over its complexity. In 1999, the pair and Mohammed Atef reworked it into what was ultimately carried out on 9/11.

Al-Qaeda then came into contact with the Hamburg cell, a terrorist cell in Germany led by Mohamed Atta. Some of the cell's members then visited camps in Afghanistan where al-Qaeda told them the plan, before the cell regrouped in Germany to work on it. Three of the members eventually piloted the hijacked planes on 9/11: Atta (Flight 11), Marwan al-Shehhi (175), and Ziad Jarrah (93). Flight 77's hijacker-pilot Hani Hanjour was not involved.

At least 19 men chosen by al-Qaeda entered the U.S. in 2000 and 2001. In addition, a potential 20th hijacker named Zacarias Moussaoui was arrested in Minnesota in August 2001. The 19 others split into four groups, and got tickets for four commercial flights on 9/11. During the hijackings, certain members of the groups attacked their respective flights' aircrews, likely using box cutters and mace, which let the others enter the planes' cockpits.

2,977 victims, plus all of the hijackers, died in the attacks. Many of the remaining conspirators in al-Qaeda were captured, then tortured during U.S. interrogations at CIA black sites or the Guantanamo Bay detention camp. Multiple federal investigations were made into 9/11, such as PENTTBOM and the 9/11 Commission. Investigators are split on if Saudi Arabia financed the attacks.

== Background ==
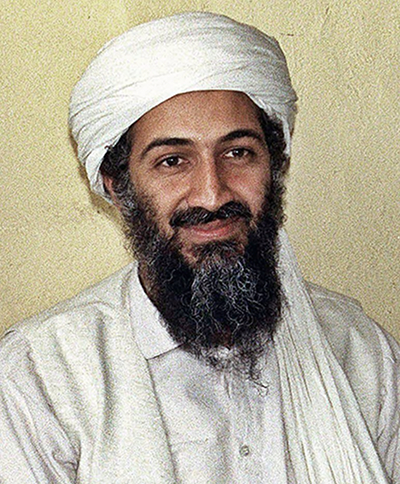
Osama bin Laden

In the Soviet–Afghan War (1979–1989), Muslim-majority Afghanistan was invaded by the mostly non-Muslim Soviet Union. Osama bin Laden, a Saudi Islamist connected to the royal House of Saud, left his country to organize the Afghan mujahideen, Muslims who fought the Soviets as jihadists; those who engage in jihad, Islamic religious struggle, are called mujahideen. For that purpose, bin Laden and Abdullah Yusuf Azzam founded Maktab al-Khidamat (MaK). After the Soviets withdrew from Afghanistan in 1989, Azzam was assassinated in Pakistan. Bin Laden then took full control of MaK, which was absorbed into his organization al-Qaeda.

Due to bin Laden's beliefs, in 1991, the royals exiled him from Saudi Arabia. He moved to Sudan, where he may have had al-Qaeda get involved in the 1993 assault on U.S. troops in Somalia. In 1996, under Saudi and American pressure, Sudan exiled him from their country. Bin Laden returned to Afghanistan, which, by then, was run by the Taliban. They allowed al-Qaeda to use the country as its base of operations.

In 1996, bin Laden issued a fatwa calling for the American troops stationed in Saudi Arabia to leave. He issued another in 1998, calling for all Muslims to take up arms against Americans. He stated that, in choosing targets of their terrorist acts, the organization would not differentiate between civilians and soldiers: "As far as we are concerned, Americans are all targets."

In August 1998, al-Qaeda bombed two U.S. embassies in Kenya and Tanzania. In 1999, the organization failed in an attempt to bomb Los Angeles International Airport (LAX) on New Year's Eve—one of many attacks they had planned to around the start of the new millennium. Shortly before New Year's, the planned perpetrator, Ahmed Ressam, tried to drive into the U.S. at the Canadian border, but border guards caught him with bomb-making material in his car. al-Qaeda also failed in an attempt to bomb USS The Sullivans, a U.S. Navy ship, on January 3, 2000. In October, they successfully bombed USS Cole while she docked in Yemen, by sailing a small radio-controlled boat up to her, then detonating a remote-controlled bomb that was on the boat. U.S. investigators suspected that "Islamic militants led [by] Osama bin Laden" were the perpetrators.

== 1990s–1996: Origins of the hijacking plan ==
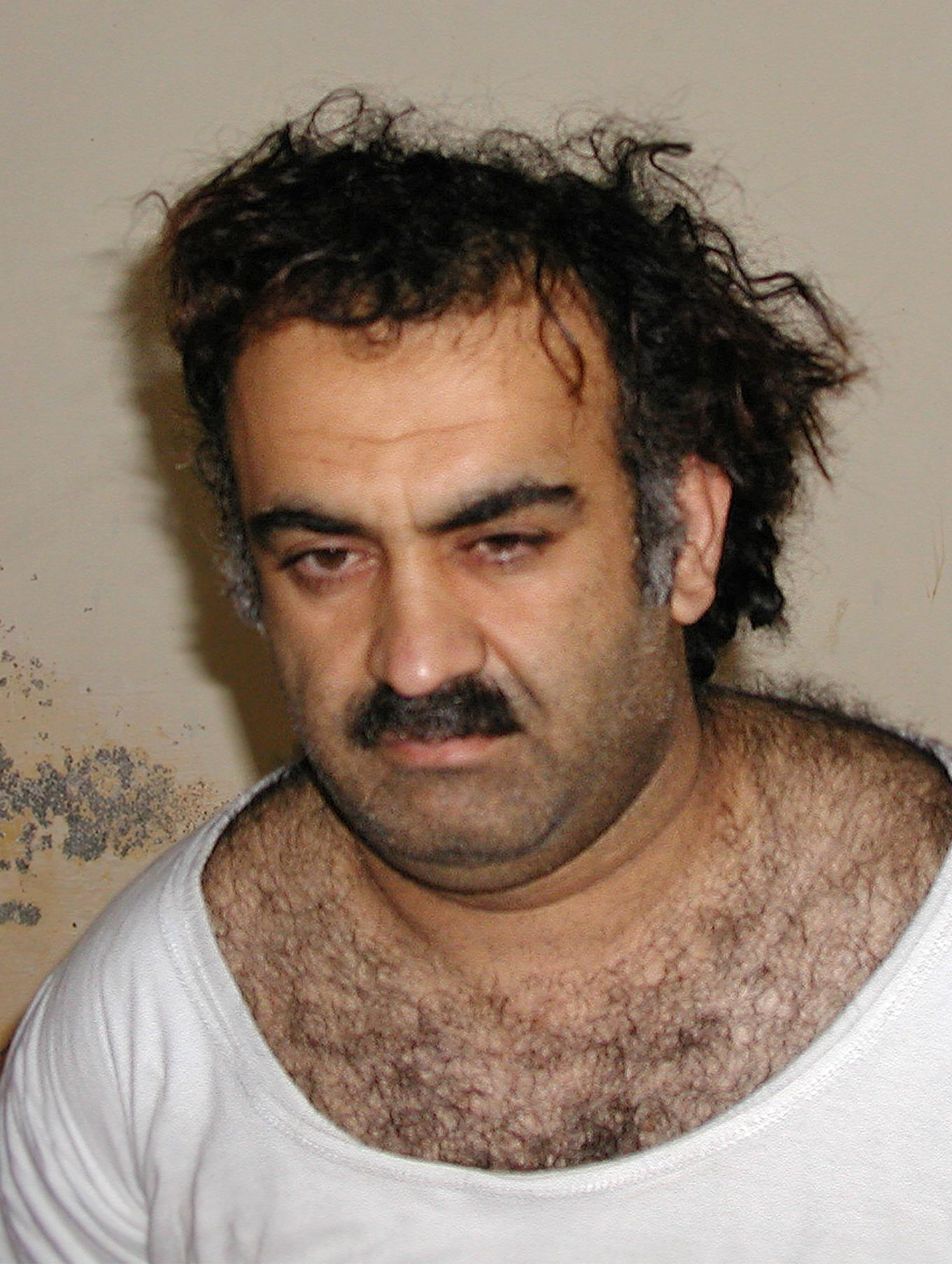
Khalid Sheikh Mohammed upon his capture in 2003

In the early 1990s, a Pakistani veteran of the Afghan mujahideen, Khalid Sheikh Mohammed, rose through the ranks of al-Qaeda to become a top lieutenant of bin Laden. During that time, he devised a plan for a series of terrorist attacks by al-Qaeda targeting airliners, which he codenamed "Bojinka"—allegedly a "nonsense word" he once heard in Afghanistan. In the "Bojinka plot", al-Qaeda and another group, Jemaah Islamiyah, planned for eleven planes departing Southeast Asia towards the United States to simultaneously be destroyed over the Pacific, via liquid bombs made by mixing chemicals.

In 1993, a group of al-Qaeda members that included Mohammed's nephew, Ramzi Yousef, bombed the underground portion of the World Trade Center (WTC) business complex in New York City, killing six people and injuring more than a thousand. During his trial five years later, Yousef claimed that he intended to topple the North Tower into the South Tower, destroying both and killing their occupants in the process. Following the attack, Yousef and other conspirators started mixing chemicals in his apartment in Manila to make the bombs for the Bojinka attacks. In 1994, Yousef rehearsed the bombings twice. One was set off at a Manila theater, the other inside Philippines Airlines Flight 434 mid-flight, killing one passenger.

In 1995, weeks before the planned bombings, the plot was foiled when Yousef's apartment burned down; investigating the fire, police found his laptop, which contained a file named "Bojinka", as well as a number of items that he fitted to carry out the bombing, but theoretically look inconspicuous to airport security. These included dolls fitted with clothes that contained nitrocellulose, a highly flammable compound. Yousef was captured by Pakistan in February 1995, and turned over to the U.S., where he was sentenced to life in prison. Investigators publicized the plan for the Bojinka plot. The Los Angeles Times reported in May that Western and Philippine officials were concerned about former Afghan mujahideen fighters who planned to commit terrorist acts in the name of Islam. Mohammed continued working on his idea regarding hijacked airliners.

== 1996–1999: Plan redesigns ==
In 1996, Mohammed presented a modified version of the Bojinka plot idea to bin Laden in Afghanistan. Al-Qaeda members would hijack ten airplanes departing from across the U.S., and nine would be crashed into the World Trade Center; the U.S. Capitol and the FBI's headquarters, in Washington, D.C.; the Pentagon in Arlington County, Virginia; the CIA's headquarters in Langley, Virginia; the Columbia Center in Seattle; the Library Tower (now the U.S. Bank Tower) in Los Angeles; and an undetermined nuclear power plant. At the time, the Columbia Center and the Library Tower were the tallest skyscrapers in Washington state and California, respectively.

Targets specified by Khalid Sheikh Mohammed in 1996
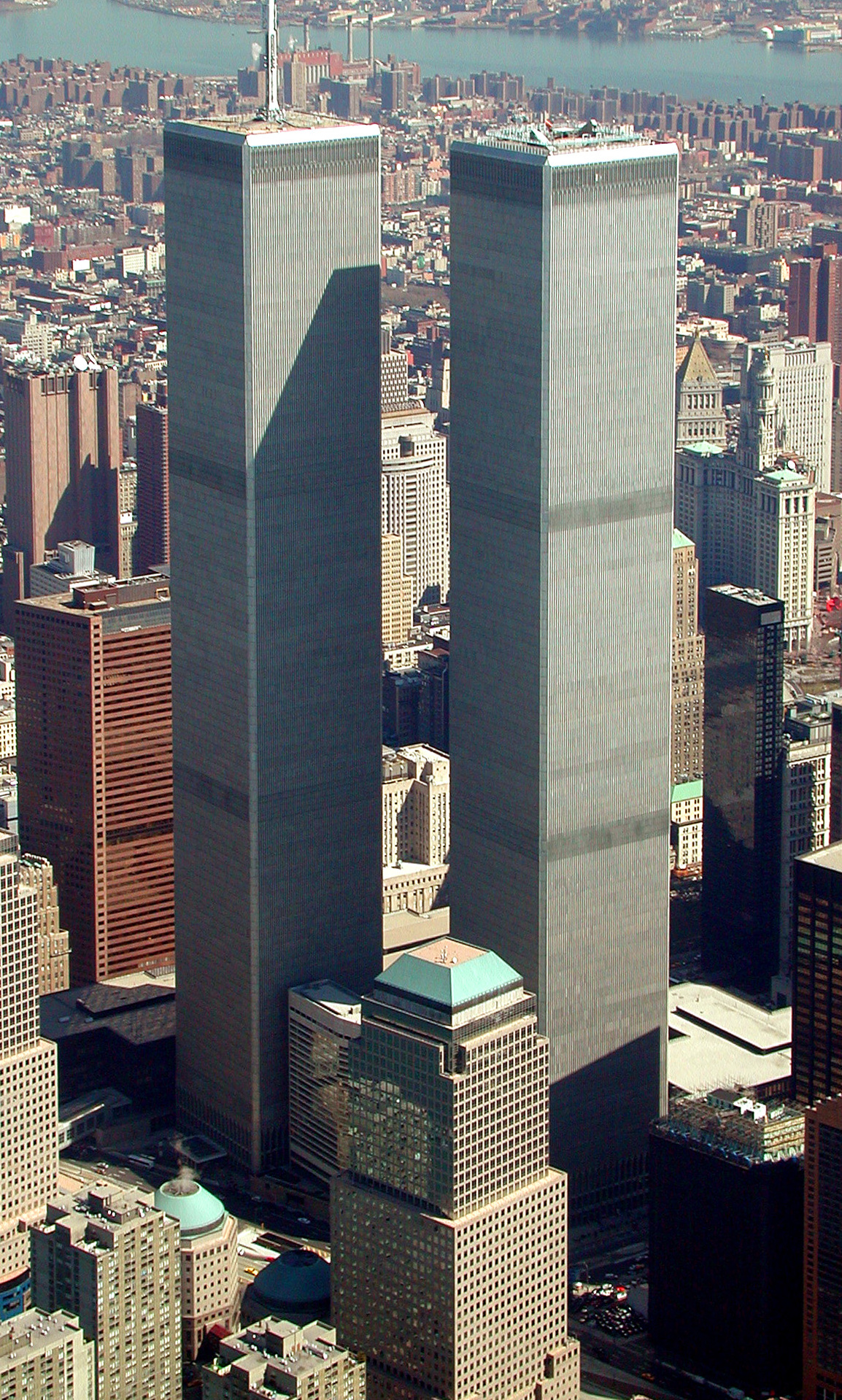
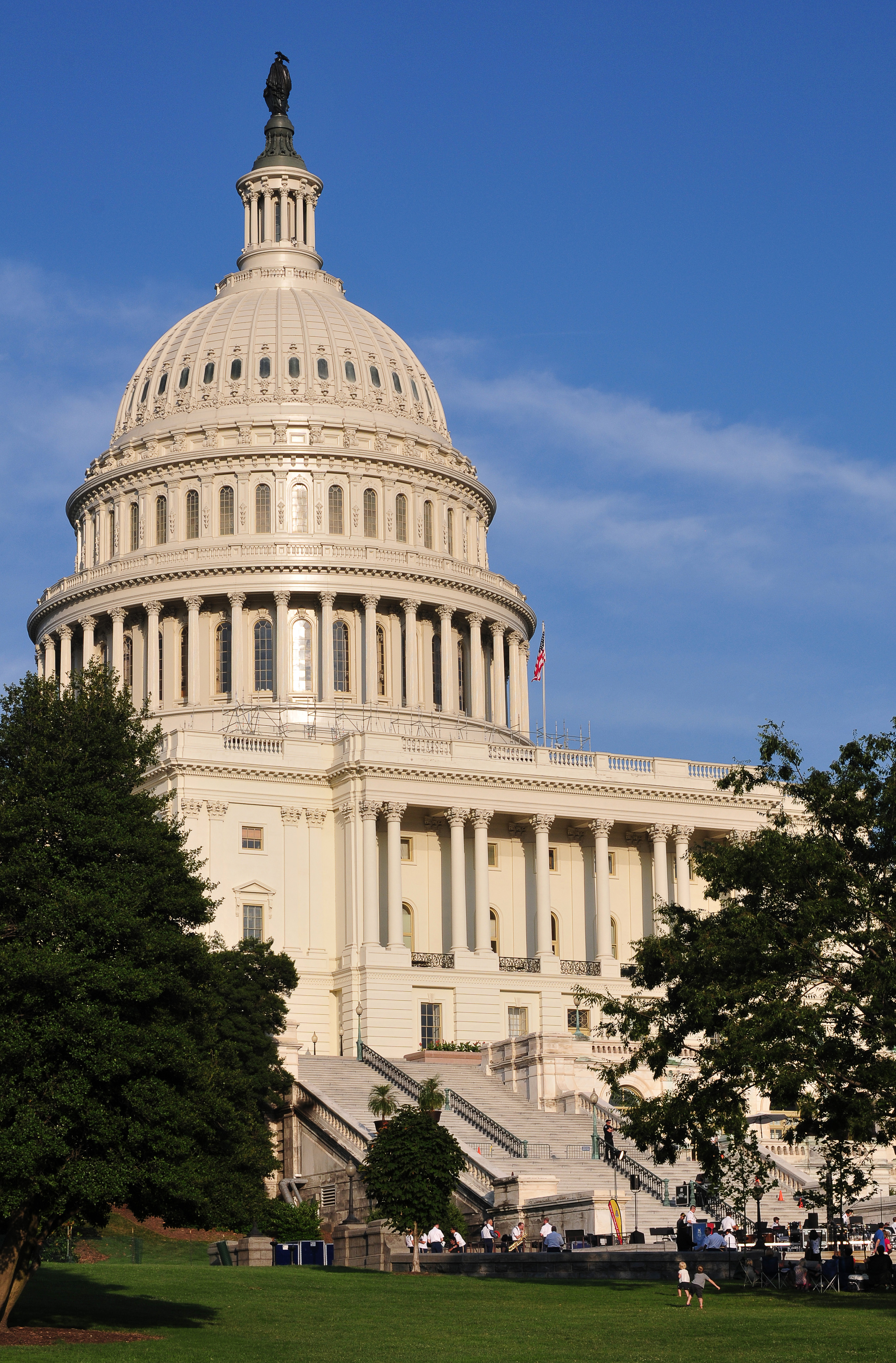
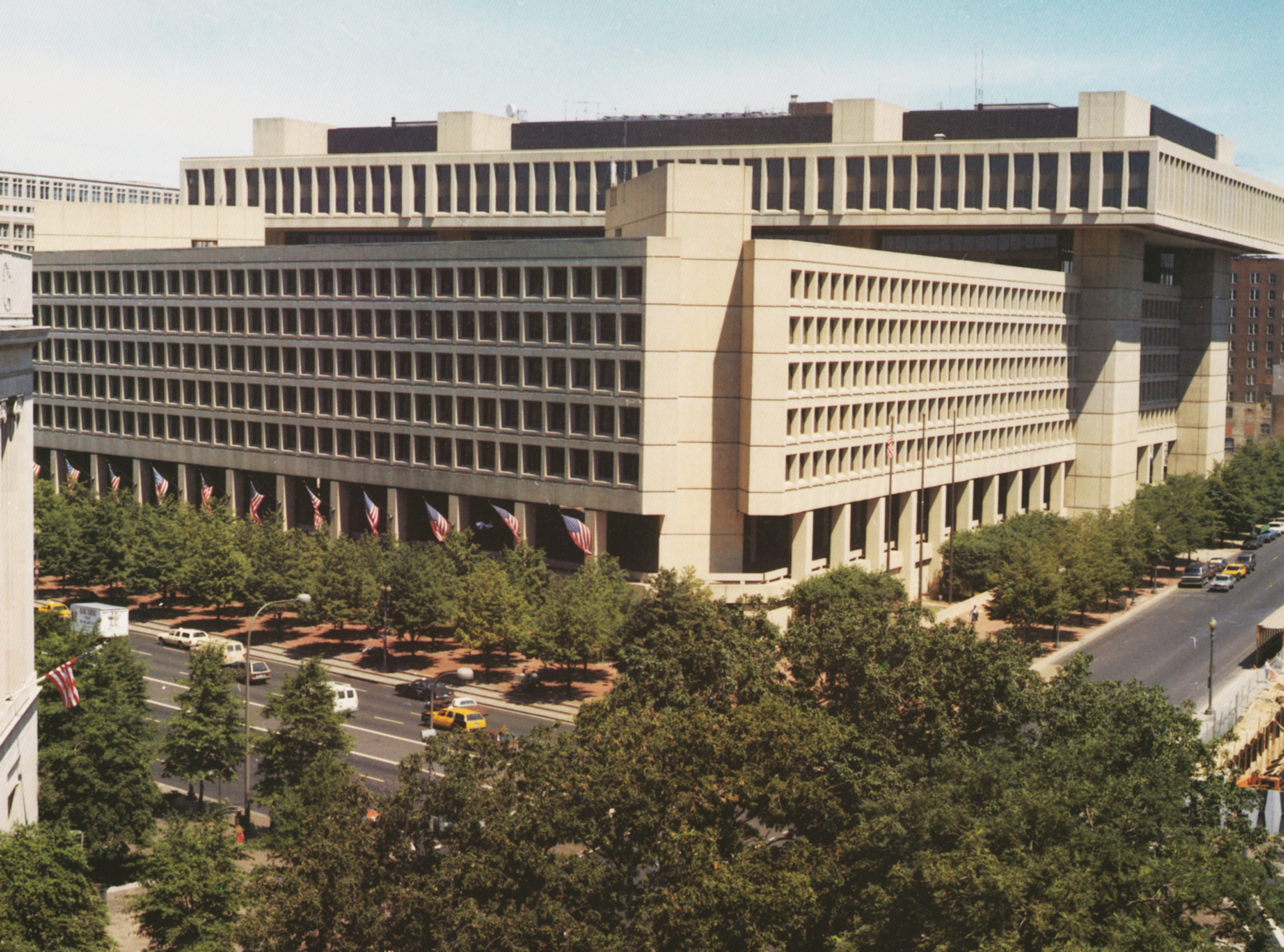
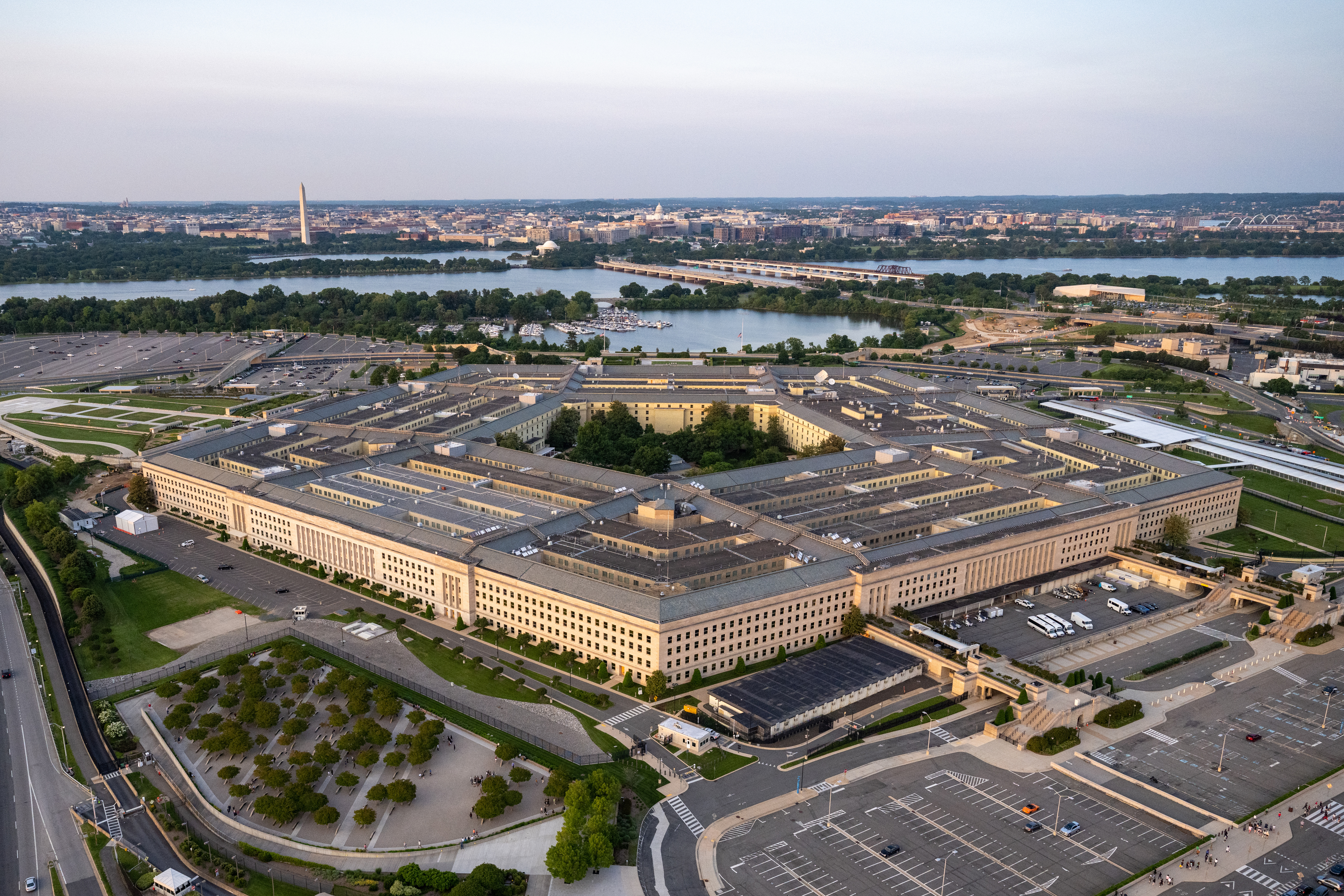
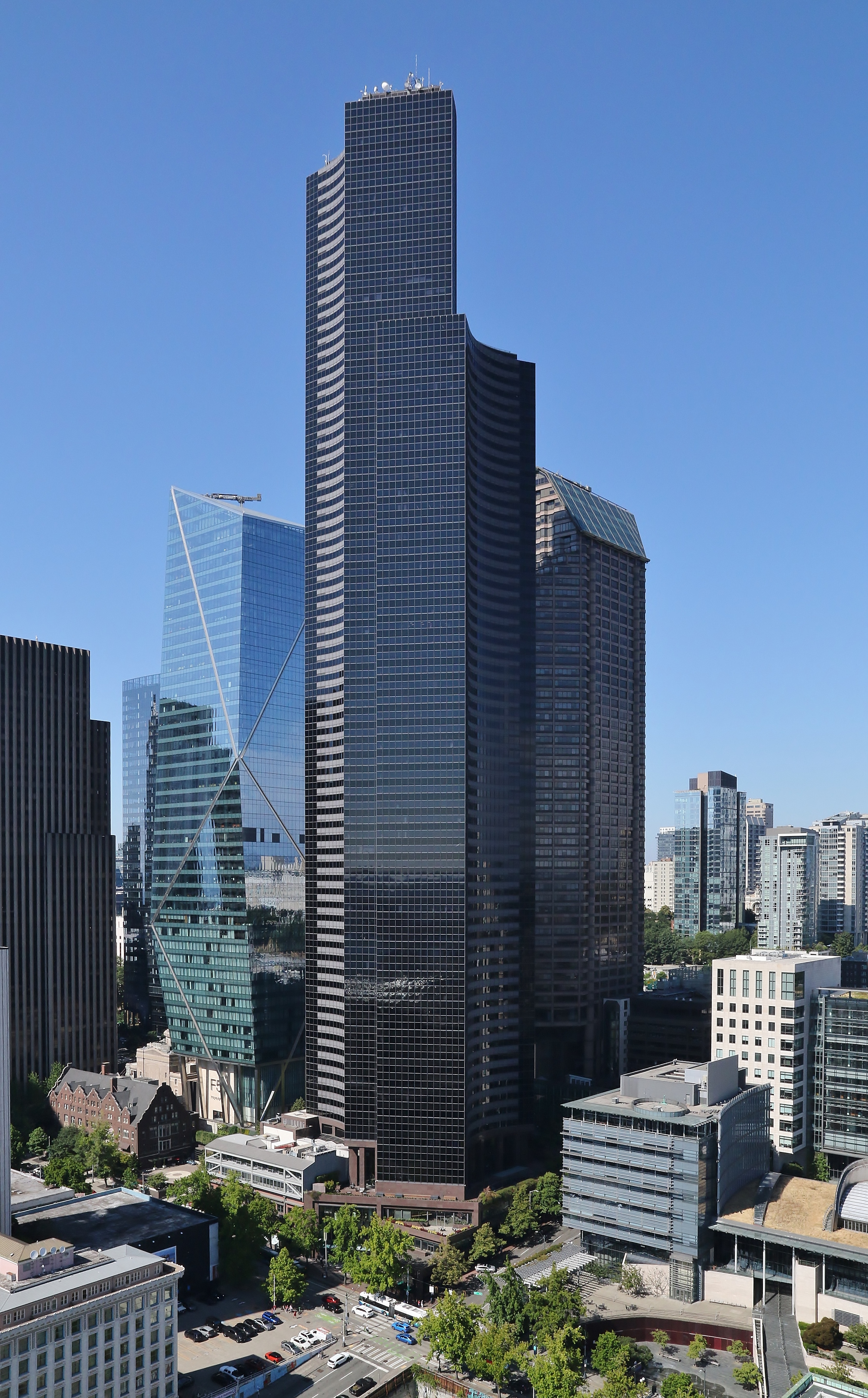
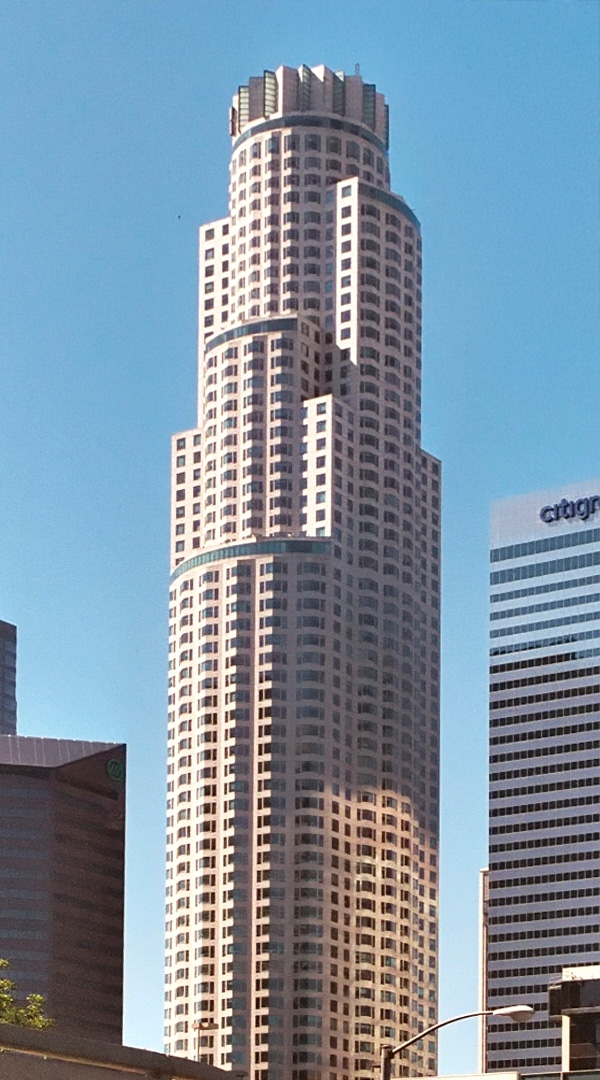
L-R: the World Trade Center, the U.S. Capitol, FBI headquarters, the Pentagon, CIA headquarters, the Columbia Center, and the Library Tower

Mohammed himself would be a hijacker on the tenth plane, which would not crash; instead, he would help killing every adult male passenger onboard, and land in an undetermined U.S. airport. There, he would give a speech to the public denouncing U.S. policy towards Israel, the Philippines, and the Arab nations, and after he was finished, the women and children would be released unharmed. Nothing came of the plan at the time, as bin Laden rejected it for being too elaborate. Mohammed later recalled that, "as we studied various targets, nuclear facilities arose as a key option", but they were discarded after concerns that the plan would "get out of hand".

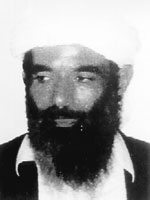
Mohammed Atef

In late 1998 or early 1999, bin Laden summoned Mohammed to Kandahar, Afghanistan, and approved for him to proceed with a scaled back version of the plan. Ayman al-Zawahiri, who had become bin Laden's deputy in 1998, convinced bin Laden to go through with the attacks, and built the "systematic organisation" that allowed al-Qaeda to enact them. In the spring of 1999, bin Laden, Mohammed, and bin Laden's deputy, Mohammed Atef, held a series of meetings where they designed the final version of the general plan, which was ultimately carried out on 9/11. They came up with a rule the hijacker-pilots of the planes would follow: that if they could not reach their intended target, they were to crash the plane at its current location. They listed potential targets that each symbolized to them the U.S.'s global power, including the World Trade Center, representing America's economy; the Pentagon, its military; the U.S. Capitol, its support of Israel; and the White House in D.C., its politics.

In a video statement by bin Laden released in 2004, he claimed he was inspired to target the World Trade Center's Twin Towers—1 and 2 World Trade Center, or the North and South Towers, respectively—as revenge for the destruction of towers of Beirut in the largely Muslim nation of Lebanon, by U.S.-backed Israeli troops during the siege of Beirut in the 1982 Lebanon War:

"God knows it did not cross our minds to attack the Towers [at first], but after [witnessing] the destroyed towers in Lebanon, it occurred to me punish the unjust the same way: to destroy towers in America, so it could taste some of what we are tasting, and to stop killing our children and women."

== 1990s–2000: Hamburg cell ==
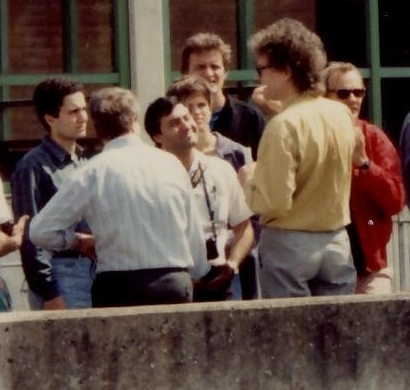
Mohamed Atta (left) talking to fellow students in Germany in 1993

In 1992, an Egyptian architect named Mohamed Atta moved to Germany to study urban planning at university in Hamburg. Four years later, he began attending the local al-Quds Mosque, popular with Islamist men. Atta was radicalized towards Islamism, either by meeting those men, or being directly contacted by an agent of bin Laden. He then became the ringleader of the Hamburg cell, a clandestine cell system of Islamic extremist terrorists who lived in the city prior to 9/11. The cell were likely planning their own jihadist activities in Russia when they met al-Qaeda's leadership, and then joined the organization in late 1999 to work on the details of al-Qaeda's redesigned hijacking plan.

Besides Atta, eleven men were members: Abdelghani Mzoudi, Ahmed Taleb, Mamoun Darkazanli, Marwan al-Shehhi, Mohammed Haydar Zammar, Mounir el-Motassadeq, Naamen Meziche, Ramzi bin al-Shibh, Said Bahaji, Zakariya Essabar, and Ziad Jarrah. Atta, al-Shehhi, and Jarrah were hijacker-pilots on 9/11. Like Atta, many of the members came to Hamburg for education, and were radicalized at the al-Quds Mosque—which was run by Darkazanli. Zammar had been in the Muslim Brotherhood in Syria, as well as a jihadist fighter in the Bosnian War (1992–1995), and a war in Afghanistan. Different sources have described both Bahaji and Zammar as the single person who brought all the members together. Bahaji acted as the cell's computer expert, Essabar helped them tamper with and forge passports, and el-Motassadeq helped with logistics, paying some members' bills, such as the students' tuitions.

Over a few months in 1999, before most of them ever engaged in terrorist activities, the members watched footage of jihadists fighting in Chechnya, a region which is internationally recognized as a republic of Russia, but is populated by separatist Chechen groups, including Islamist militants. In the Second Chechen War (1999–2009), the Islamists waged defensive jihad against the Russian military. Watching the videos, the cell became motivated to join them in-person. In 2004, the U.S. government's 9/11 Commission claimed that the members boarded a train going east, the direction of Chechnya, in late 1999. By chance, an al-Qaeda member named "Khalid al-Masri" was onboard at the same time. He met the cell, and convinced them to join the organization. Before then, the commission found, the cell had no connection to al-Qaeda, and no intentions of attacking the U.S. The Commission's claim that "al-Masri" sent the cell to Duisburg, Germany, before they met al-Qaeda was later proven false.

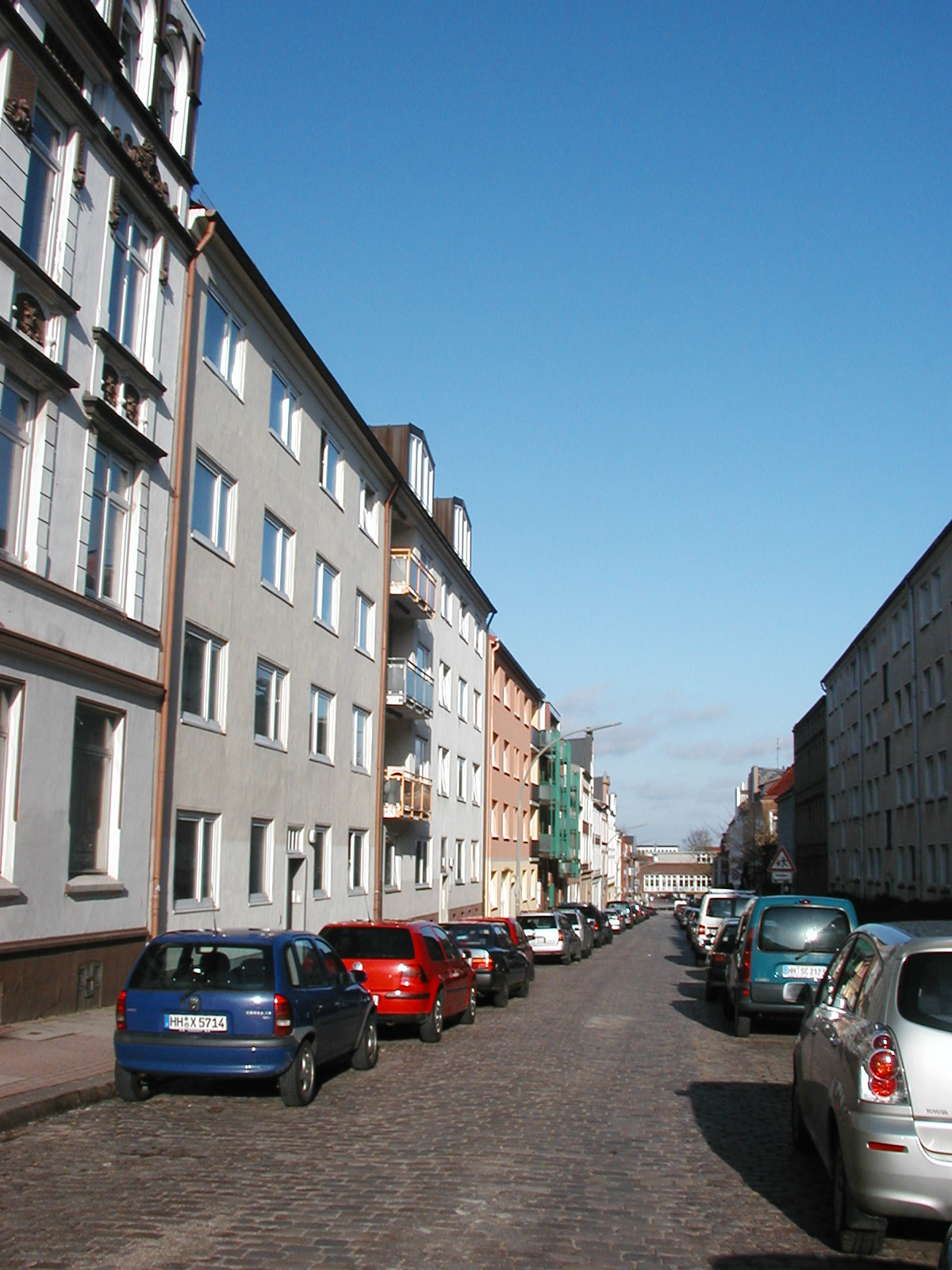
9/11 was planned at Atta's apartment on Marienstraße (Marien Street) in Hamburg

Al-Shehhi, Atta, bin al-Shibh, and Jarrah separately entered Afghanistan via the Pakistani border, and visited one or more jihadist camps, where al-Qaeda's leaders trained them to be terrorists, and briefed them on the plan to hijack American airliners. After the cell regrouped in Germany, it worked on al-Qaeda's plan in Atta's apartment on Marienstraße (Marien Street). At least bin al-Shibh, Bahaji, and Essabar were his roommates at different times.

== Hijackers and their collaborators ==
On 9/11, 19 members of al-Qaeda hijacked four commercial planes in the United States, and all 19 died as a result of their flights' respective crashes. During the planning of the attacks, Khalid Sheikh Mohammed was the third-in-command of al-Qaeda, as the head of its "military committee" which provided operational support to the hijackers. One of his roles was to help them arrange travel. He later recalled that al-Qaeda "had a large surplus of [members] willing to die as martyrs [for Islam]" by committing suicide attacks, and described a "department of martyrs" in the organization which consisted of only those people.

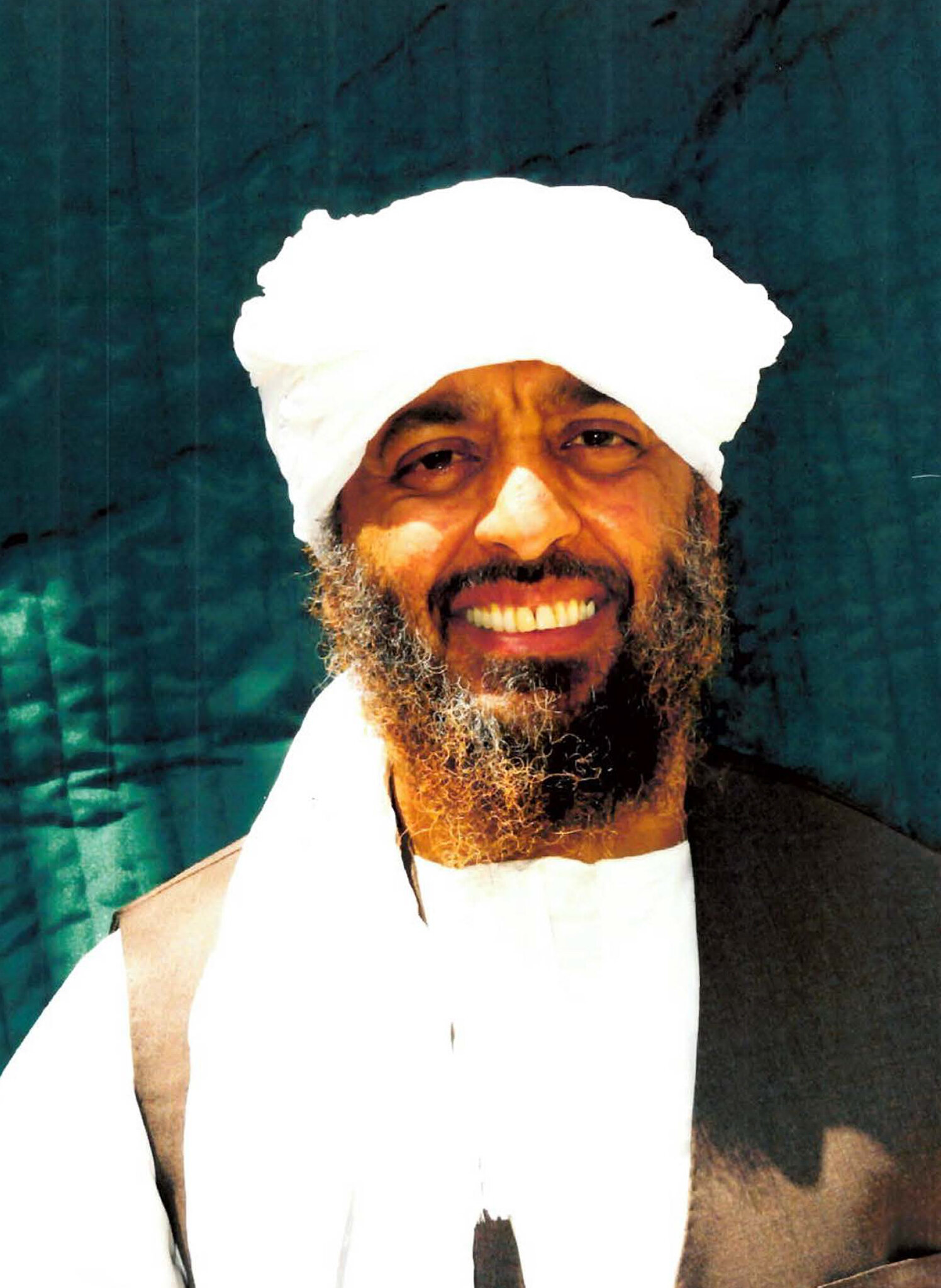
Ramzi bin al-Shibh

In the 1999 meeting between Khalid Sheikh Mohammed, Atef, and bin Laden, the latter recommended four men as conspirators: al-Mihdhar, Nawaf al-Hazmi, Abu Bara al Yemeni, and Walid bin Attash. Al-Qaeda's leaders chose the hijackers in 2000, looking for members who had special skills. Bin Laden selected al-Shehhi, Atta, bin al-Shibh, and Jarrah, because they were English speakers, educated, and by living in Germany, had experience in the West. Bin al-Shibh was eventually denied a U.S. visa, so he stayed in Hamburg, acting as a liaison between the hijackers and al-Qaeda's leadership. One job was to notify hijackers of wire transfers from the leaders. Khalid Sheikh Mohammed later referred to him as the "coordinator" of the operation. Mohammed's nephew, Ammar al-Baluchi, is alleged by the U.S. to have been another conspirator, helping the hijackers with wire transfers, travel arrangements, and living Western lifestyles. Furthermore, bin Attash took trips of various U.S.-based airlines to test their security. The CIA later estimated that al-Qaeda's total operating costs prior to 9/11 totaled around $30 million USD per year.

=== American Airlines Flight 11 ===
American Airlines Flight 11, which departed Logan International Airport in Boston for LAX, was crashed into 1 World Trade Center. The perpetrators were the hijacker-pilot Mohammed Atta, and four Saudis: Abdulaziz al-Omari, Satam al-Suqami, and brothers Wail and Waleed al-Shehri. Al-Omari grew up in Asir, a poor part of Saudi Arabia. He served as an imam at his mosque in Al-Qassim Province. Investigators refer to the mosque as a "factory" for Islamic terrorism. Al-Omari was taught by an extremist cleric there named Sulayman al-Alwan. Al-Suqami grew up in Riyadh, and began studying law at university when his friend and roommate Majed Moqed, a fellow Saudi 9/11 hijacker, recruited him to join al-Qaeda. He then had terrorist training in Afghanistan. The al-Shehris also grew up in Asir. Wail worked as a primary school teacher in the city of Khamis Mushait. In 2000, Wail traveled to Medina, a holy city in Islam, in an attempt to treat his mental health problems; Waleed accompanied him. At the city, they were recommended to go to Afghanistan; there, they trained at an al-Qaeda camp, and were briefed about the hijacking plan.

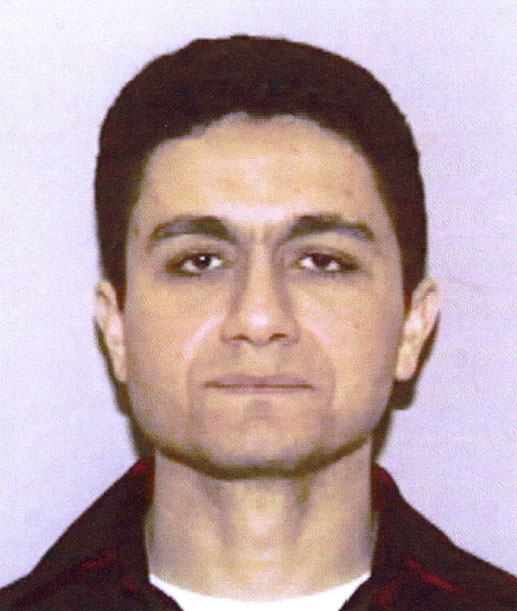
Mohamed Atta, hijacker-pilot

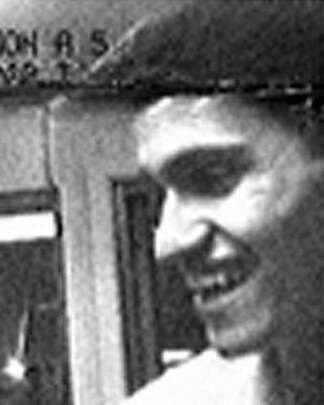
Abdulaziz al-Omari

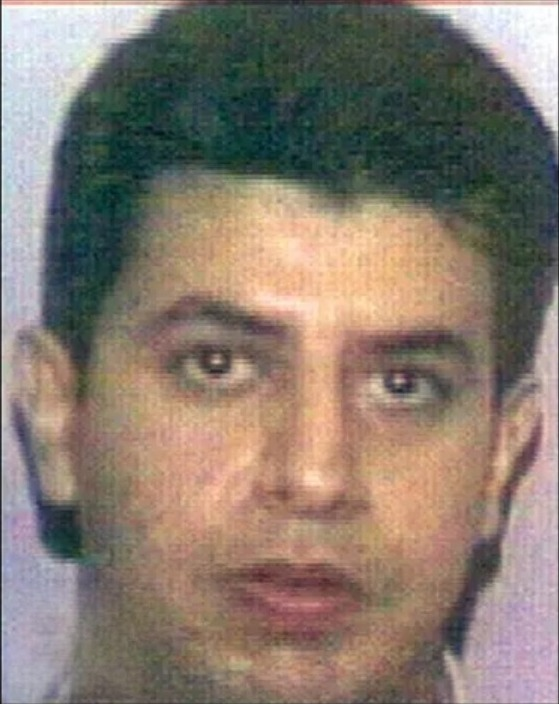
Wail al-Shehri

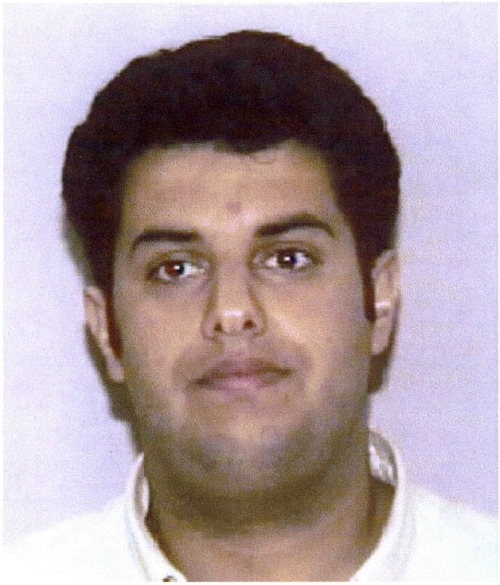
Waleed al-Shehri

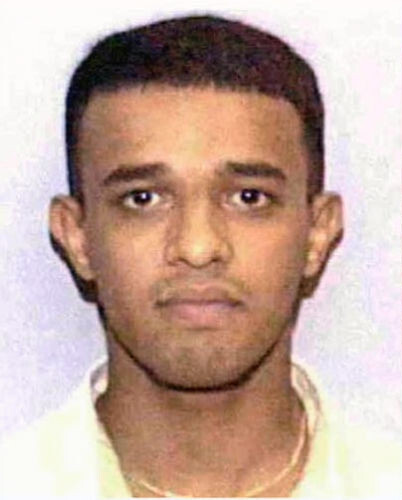
Satam al-Suqami

The flight path of Flight 11

=== United Airlines Flight 175 ===
United Airlines Flight 175, also departing Logan for LAX, was crashed into 2 World Trade Center. Two of the hijackers were Emiratis: the hijacker-pilot Marwan al-Shehhi, and Fayez Banihammad. Brothers Ahmed and Hamza al-Ghamdi were Saudis, as was Mohand al-Shehri, who was not related to Wail or Waleed. Al-Shehhi traveled from the UAE to Germany in 1996. He met Atta and Jarrah while attending the al-Quds Mosque. Banihammad lived with his family in the UAE, until he left to go to Asir, where he was recruited to al-Qaeda. He then told his family he would be gone to do "relief work" in another country. Ahmed and Hamza were from the poor Al Bahah region of Saudi Arabia, the same as fellow hijackers Ahmed al-Haznawi and Saeed al-Ghamdi (not related). There is evidence suggesting that all four had met each other by early 1999. Like the Hamburg cell, Ahmed and Hamza initially left Saudi Arabia to fight the Russian military in Chechnya. Inside Chechnya, there were recruited into al-Qaeda. When he left for the U.S., he told his family that he was still in Chechnya. Mohand al-Shehri travelled to fight in Chechnya after failing in his studies in Saudi Arabia. He was also recruited to al-Qaeda, and attended one of their training camps in al-Qaeda.

For copyright reasons, Ahmed al-Ghamdi's photo is only on his article

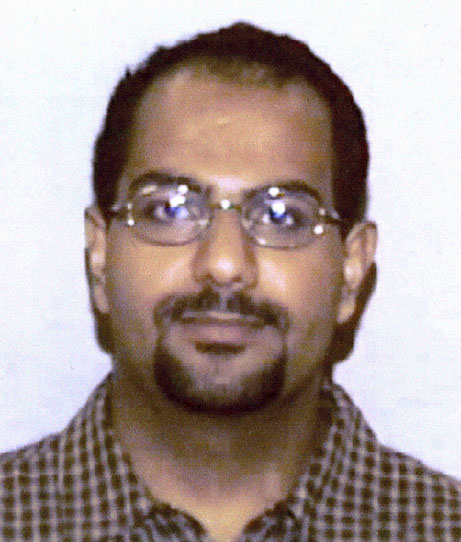
Marwan al-Shehhi, hijacker-pilot

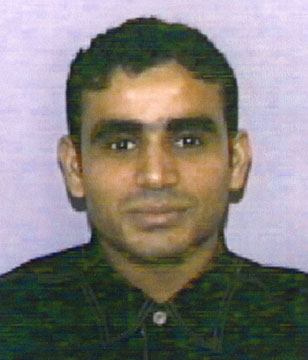
Fayez Banihammad

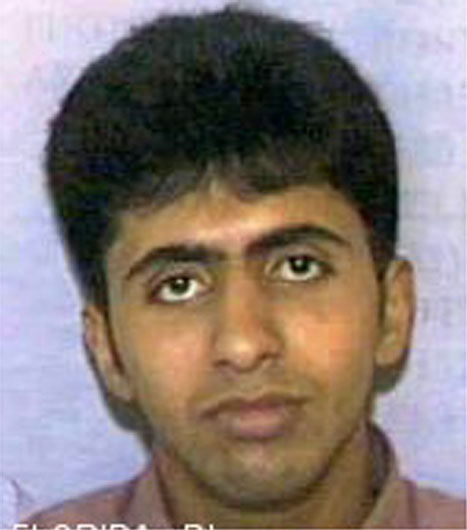
Mohand al-Shehri

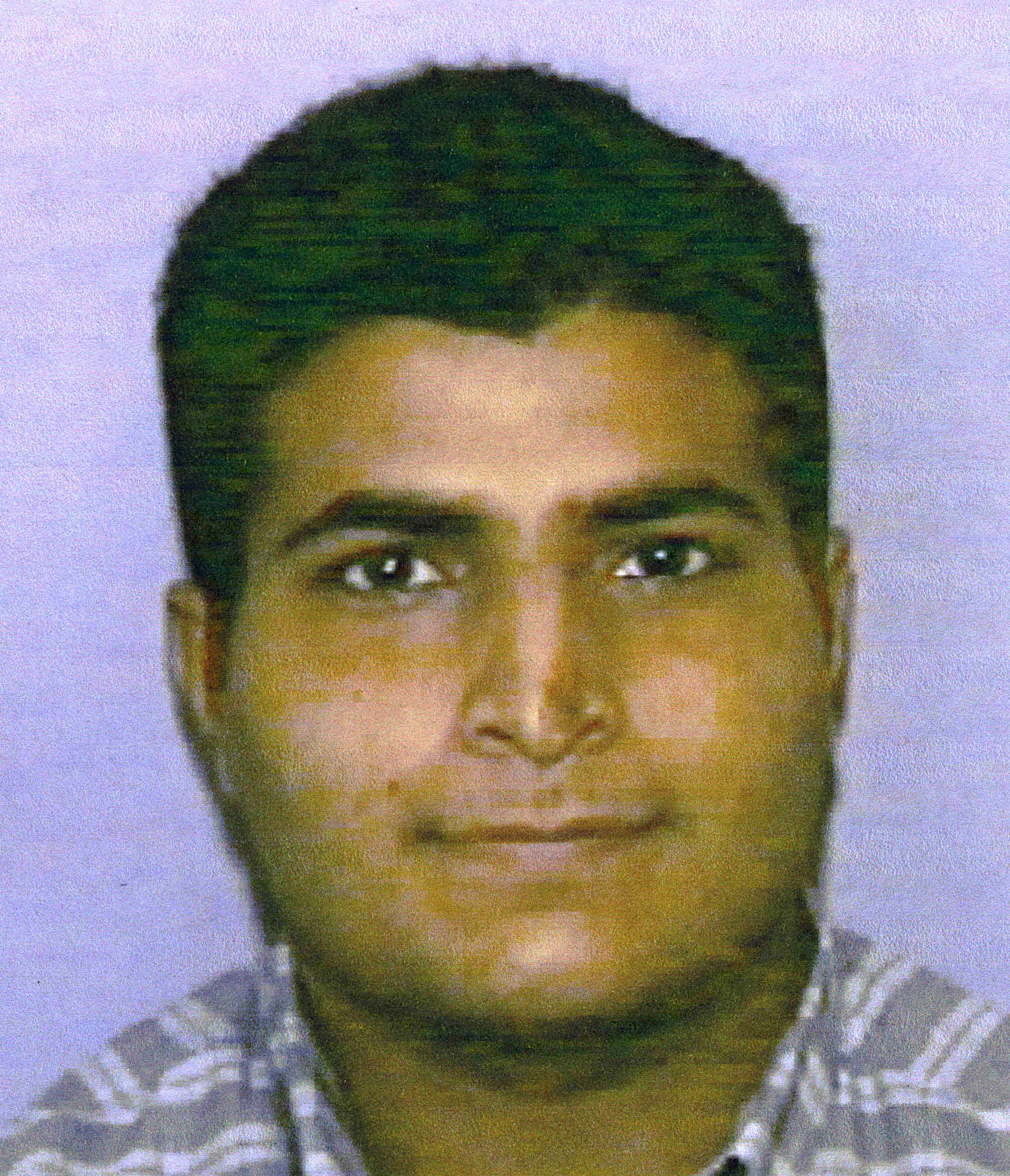
Hamza al-Ghamdi

The flight path of Flight 175

=== American Airlines Flight 77 ===
American Airlines Flight 77, which departed Dulles International Airport in Dulles, Virginia, for LAX, was crashed into the Pentagon. All five perpetrators were Saudis: the hijacker-pilot Hani Hanjour, Khalid al-Mihdhar, Majed Moqed, and brothers Nawaf and Salem al-Hazmi. In 1991, Hanjour entered the U.S. for the first time to study at the University of Arizona. He left the country, then returned in 1996 to live in California. He then trained in Arizona to become a pilot. He received his pilot's license in 1999, making him the only 9/11 hijacker-pilot to have their license before being selected by al-Qaeda; he was chosen for that reason. Before 9/11, al-Mihdhar left Saudi Arabia for the Republic of Bosnia and Herzegovina, to fight in the Bosnian mujahideen during the Bosnian War. While fighting, he was likely recruited to train with al-Qaeda in Afghanistan. Majed Moqed was raised near Medina, and was recruited to train with al-Qaeda when he was studying law at university. Nawaf and Salem were from Al Bahah.

For copyright reasons, Salem al-Hazmi's photo is only on his article

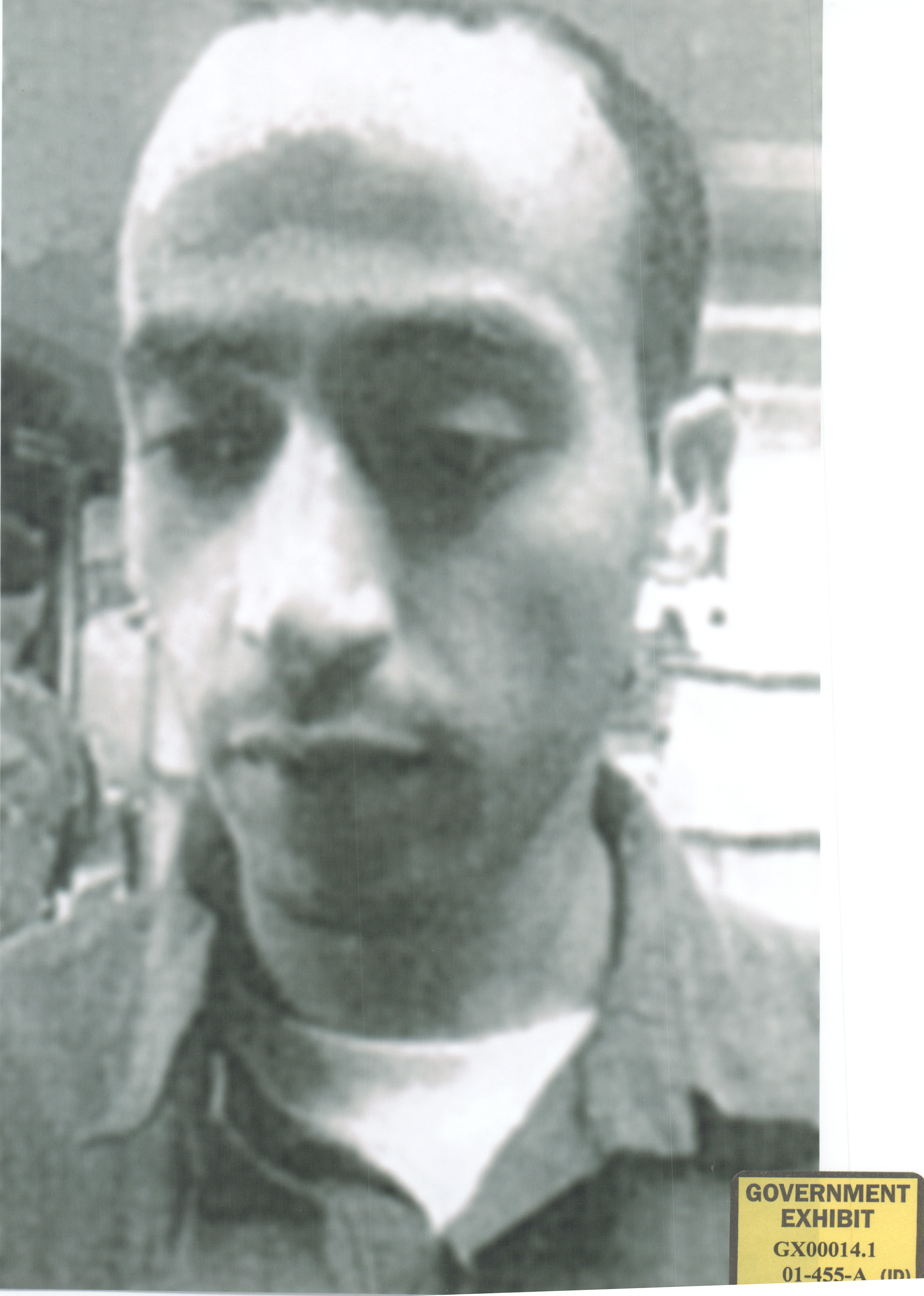
Hani Hanjour, hijacker-pilot

Khalid al-Mihdhar

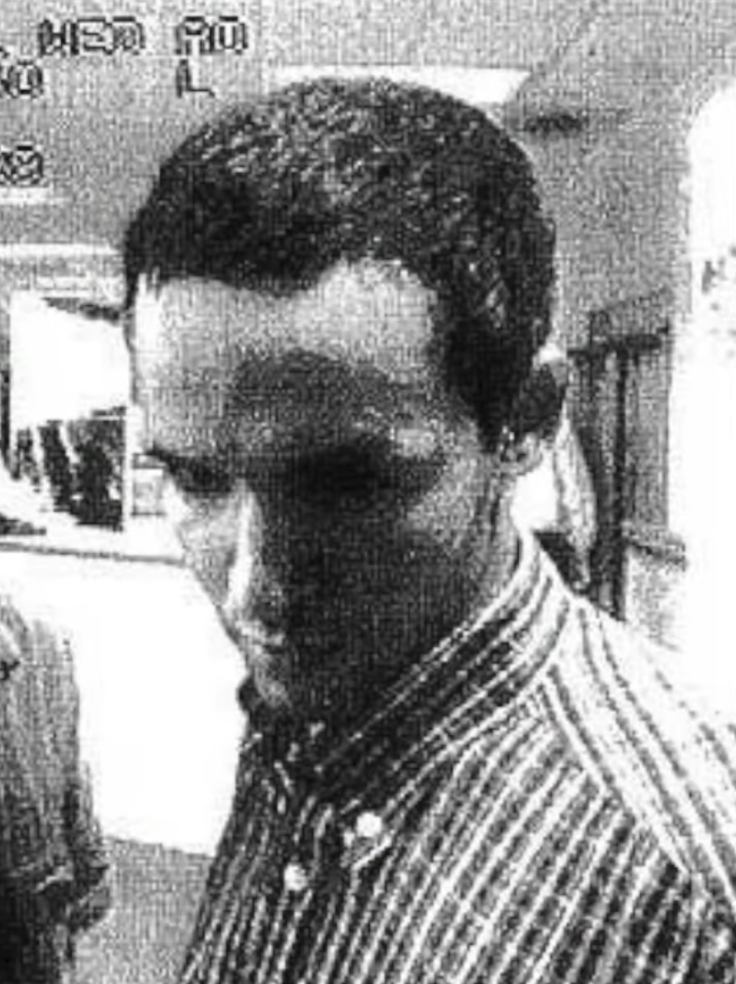
Majed Moqed

Nawaf al-Hazmi

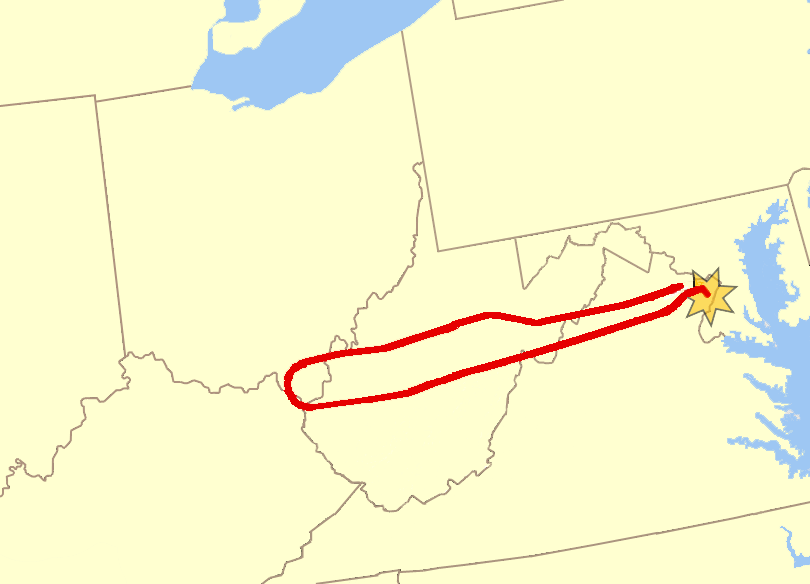
The flight path of Flight 77

=== United Airlines Flight 93 ===
United Airlines Flight 93, which departed Newark International Airport in Newark, New Jersey, for San Francisco International Airport, unintentionally crashed in Pennsylvania. Its hijackers were the hijacker-pilot Ziad Jarrah, from Lebanon, and three Saudis: Ahmed al-Haznawi; Saeed al-Ghamdi, and Ahmed al-Nami. During Flight 93's hijacking, the crew and passengers revolted against the terrorists and tried to take back the plane's cockpit. This caused it to crash in a field in Stonycreek Township, Somerset County, rather than the hijackers' intended target. The target is unknown, but investigators presume it to have been either the U.S. Capitol or the White House. Jarrah moved from Lebanon to Hamburg in the 1990s, and there, he met al-Shehhi and Atta at the al-Quds Mosque. Al-Hawzani was from Al Bahah, and was recruited to train with al-Qaeda in Afghanistan while fighting in Chechnya. Al-Nami was from Asir. In 2000, he left his family's home to take the Hajj, Islamic pilgrimage to Mecca, and did not come back, as he was recruited to train in Afghanistan. Saeed dropped out of school when he joined the fight in Chechnya. Like others, he was recruited to go to Afghanistan during the war.

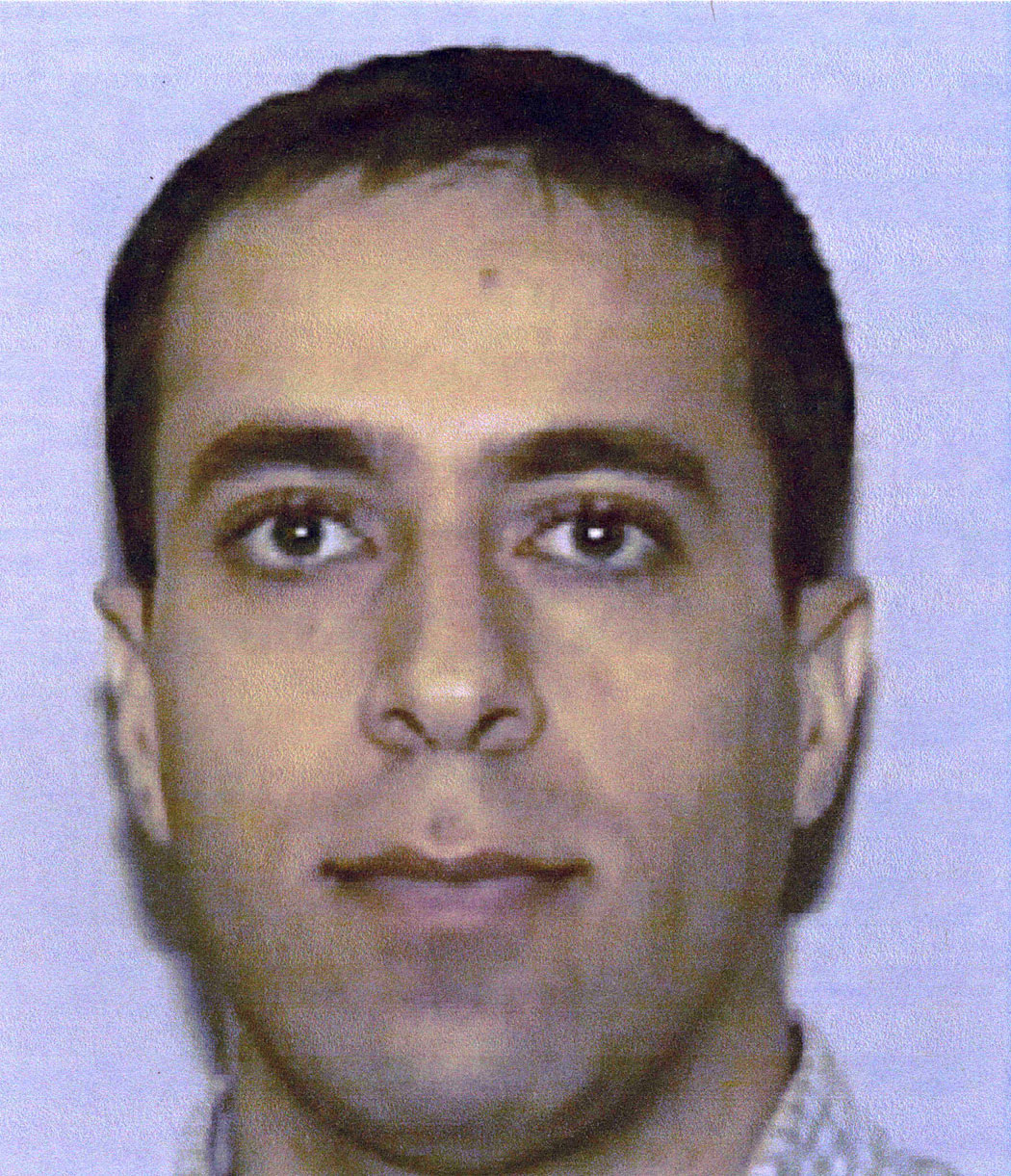
Ziad Jarrah, hijacker-pilot

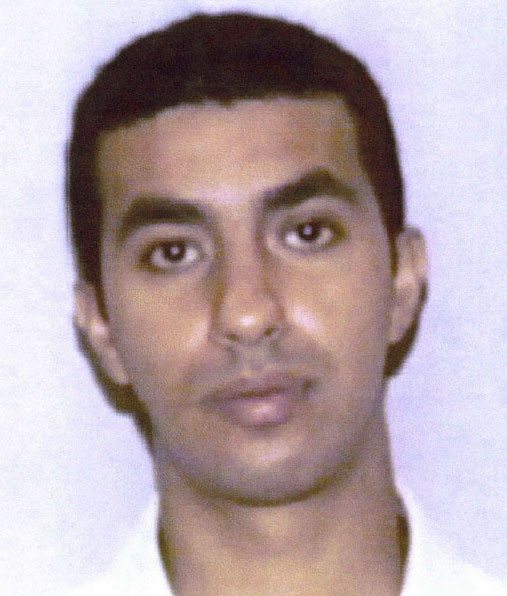
Ahmed al-Haznawi

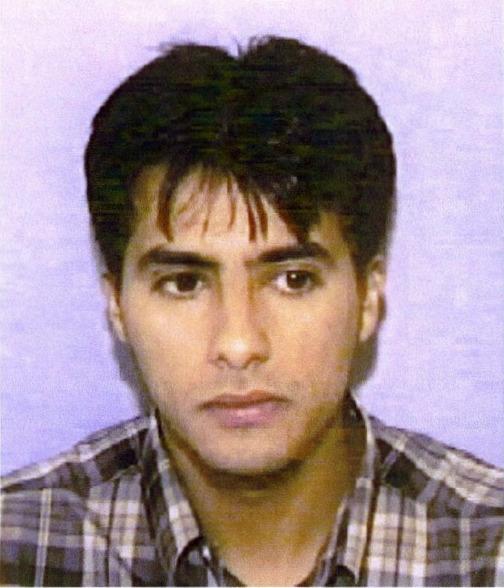
Ahmed al-Nami

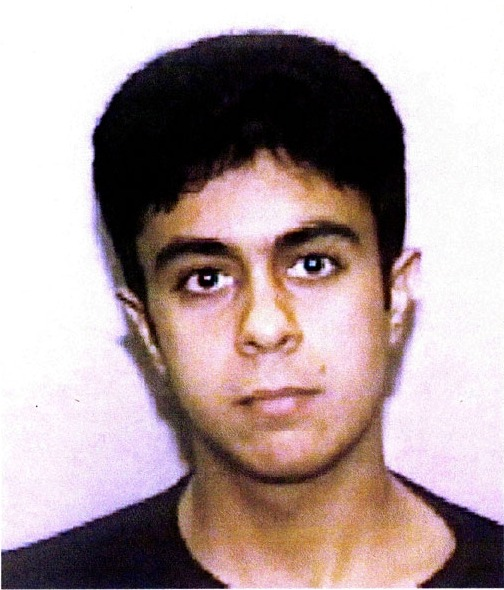
Saeed al-Ghamdi

The flight path of Flight 93

== 2000–2001: Hijackers', collaborators', and suspects' actions ==
=== 2000 ===
In 1999, messages from an al-Qaeda logistics center in Yemen were intercepted by the CIA, mentioning that some al-Qaeda members, including Khalid al-Mihdhar and Nawaf al-Hazmi, would hold a summit in Kuala Lumpur in January 2000. Why they were meeting was not mentioned. The event happened as planned; the CIA had Malaysian authorities take pictures of the participants as they arrived, but the meeting was not detailed or tape recorded. After 9/11, U.S. intelligence found that the summit was likely held to plan al-Qaeda's future terrorist attacks. Three of the people that authorities photographed were al-Mihdhar and al-Hazmi, bin al-Shibh (not identified by authorities as being in the pictures until after 9/11); and bin Attash, a likely perpetrator of the USS Cole bombing.

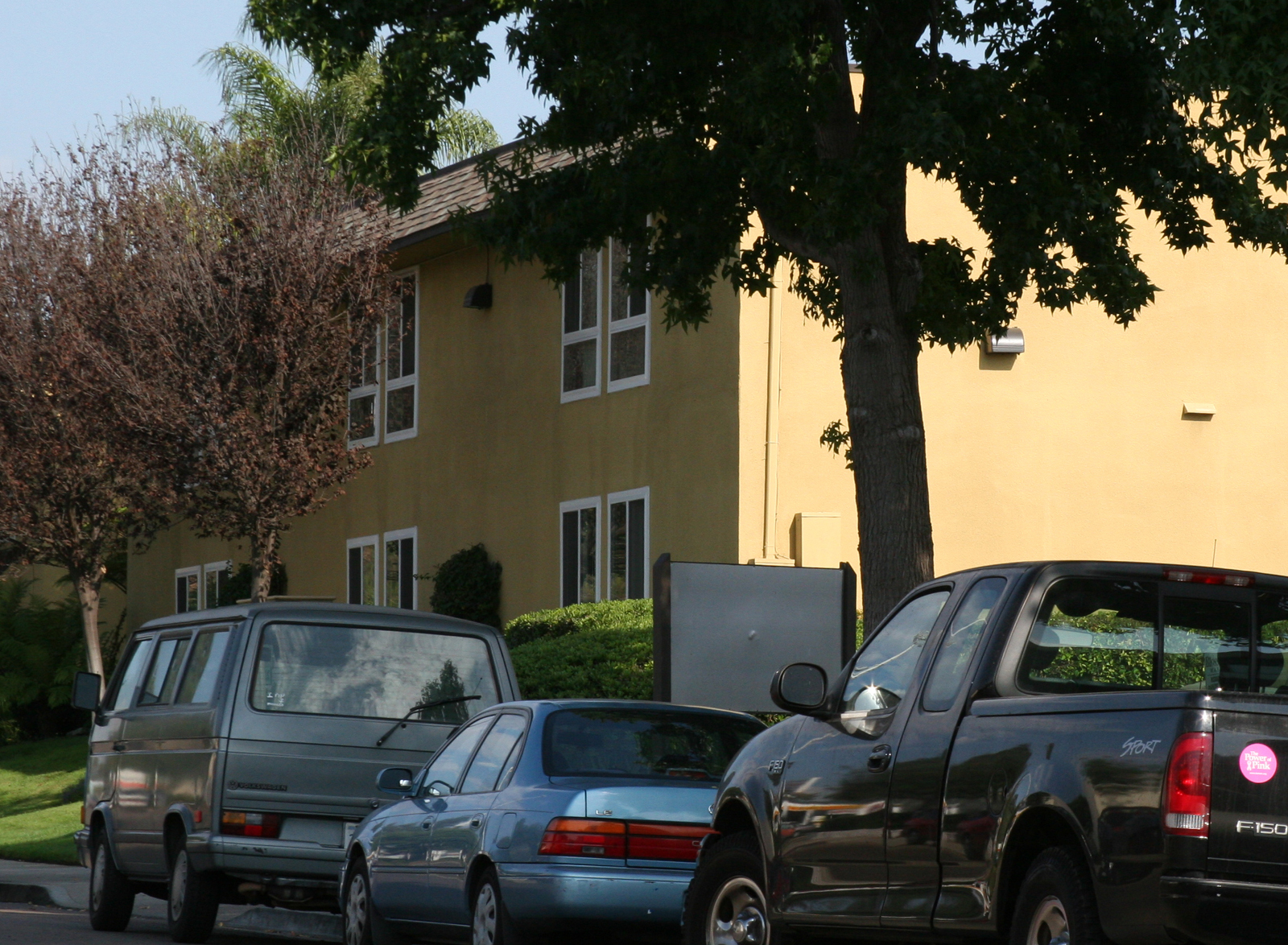
The Parkwood Apartments complex in San Diego, where al-Mihdhar and Nawaf al-Hazmi lived from February to May 2000

On or about January 15, al-Mihdhar and Nawaf al-Hazmi arrived in Los Angeles from Bangkok. This was the first time any hijacker entered the U.S. in preparation for the attacks. They met up with Omar al-Bayoumi, a Saudi man who helped them move into another rental of his apartment complex in San Diego. Al-Mihdhar and Nawaf took flying lessons there, and performed poorly during them, leading them to be "muscle" hijackers instead of hijacker-pilots. Some investigators suspect al-Bayoumi of involvement in 9/11, including by helping the pair open a bank account in the U.S. He denies this, claiming that he simply met by chance at a Los Angeles restaurant, and wanted to talk to fellow Arabic speakers. In 2002, the U.S. said it was investigating al-Bayoumi for involvement in the plot. Ultimately, he was never charged. The 9/11 Commission Report claimed he was not an extremist; in contrast, former CIA analyst Gina Barrett claims that he was essential in the plot, as when he met al-Mihdhar and Nawaf, they spoke very little English, while he was fluent in it. After 9/11, at al-Bayoumi's apartment in Birmingham, England, investigators found a 1999 video he taped in Washington, D.C., in which he points out and comments on landmarks like the U.S. Capitol. He mentions some type of plan: "Their cars, you said that in the plan". A 2017 FBI report stated there is a "50/50 chance" he had foreknowledge of the plot.

Mohamed Atta, Ramzi bin al-Shibh, and Ziad Jarrah were still in Afghanistan in January 2000. A videotape timestamped January 8, and released in 2006, shows them together with bin Laden at al-Qaeda's Tarnak Farms camp in the country. Later in January, after returning to Germany, Marwan al-Shehhi and Atta hid their time in Afghanistan from potential security officials at international airports by reporting their passports as stolen and receiving blank duplicates. Jarrah did the same in February. In March, while in Germany, Atta emailed the Academy of Lakeland flight training school in Florida to inquire about their services:

"Dear sir, we are a small group of young men from different Arab countries. Now we are living in Germany since a while for study purposes. We would like to start training for the career of airline professional pilots. In this field we haven't yet any knowledge but we are ready to undergo an intensive training program (up to ATP [an airline transport pilot license] and eventually higher)." [sic]

He sent fifty to sixty similar emails to other flight training schools in the U.S. On May 18, Atta applied for and received a U.S. visa. On the 25th, Jarrah did the same. Al-Shehhi arrived in the U.S. on the 29th. On June 3, Atta arrived in the U.S. Around early June, he and al-Shehhi attended Airman Flight School in Norman, Oklahoma. Bin al-Shibh applied for a U.S. visa four times from around June to October, and was denied because he was a Yemeni citizen. Authorities believed that Yemenis were more prone to overstaying visas. Zakariya Essabar, a Moroccan, was also denied. On June 27, Jarrah arrived in the U.S. for the first time, in Newark, New Jersey. Until 9/11, Jarrah likely entered the U.S. after leaving it on seven occasions, more than any other hijacker.

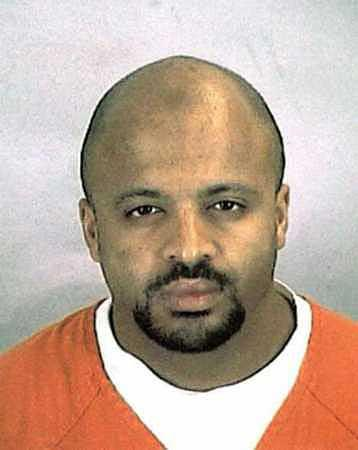
Zacarias Moussaoui

In this time, al-Shehhi, Atta, and Jarrah arrived in Venice, Florida, and they visited Huffman Aviation, supposedly to "check out the facility". They said they were not happy with a different flight school in the area. From around June to September 2000, al-Shehhi received five wire transfers from a sender or senders in the UAE: $4,790 USD while he was in Manhattan, and to his joint bank account with Atta at a SunTrust bank in Florida: $9,984, $9,485, $19,985, and then $69,985. In that same period, in Germany, bin al-Shibh wired unspecified amounts of money separately to Atta and al-Shehhi in Florida. Between June 2000 and 9/11, Atta made multiple inquires into starting a crop dusting company; fellow conspirator Zacarias Moussaoui did the same around June 2001.

Around October, Moussaoui received multiple letters from a Malaysian company named Infocus Tech, stating that he had been hired as their marketing consultant for the U.S., U.K., and the rest of Europe, for which he would be paid $2,500 USD a month.

In Ohio, around November 25, Atta purchased videos of the flight decks of the Boeing 747 and 757 from a business named the Ohio Pilot Store. At the same store around December 11, Atta purchased flight deck videos of Boeing 757 and Airbus A320 aircraft models. He went back to Florida, and on the 21st, he and al-Shehhi received their pilot's licenses to use civilian aircraft from Huffman Aviation.

Bin al-Shibh went from Hamburg to London around December 2 to 9. On the 8th, Hani Hanjour landed at San Diego, entering the U.S. for the last time. At some point, he left San Diego for Arizona to refresh his piloting skills. Around the 9th, Moussaoui flew from London to Pakistan.

=== Early-to-mid 2001 ===
Moussaoui had flight training at Pan Am International Flight Academy in Phoenix, Arizona, around January to March 2001. Around February 1, Atta had a checkride around Decatur, Georgia, and al-Shehhi had the same there around the 15th.

Moussaoui flew from Pakistan back to London around February 7, flew to Chicago around February 23, and then to Oklahoma City later that day. Around three days later, he traveled to Norman. He opened a bank account, and deposited about $32,000 into it. He attended flight training at the Airman Flight School from around February to May, before ending his classes prematurely.

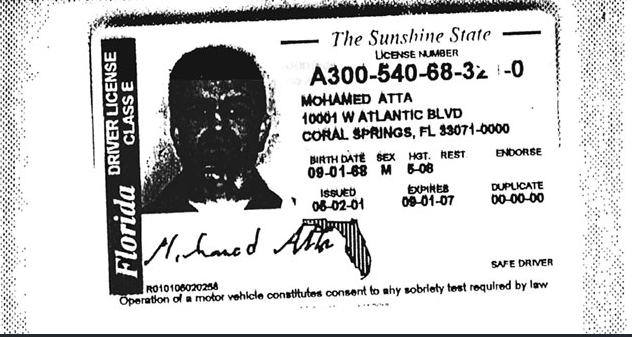
Atta's Florida driver's license

Also in February, a person with Abdulaziz al-Omari's name visited the Philippines twice.

At the Ohio Pilot Store around March 19, Nawaf al-Hazmi purchased flight deck videos of Boeing 747 and 777 models. He is known to have been in Oklahoma around April 1.

Jarrah and Atta received their Florida driver's licenses on May 2.

On May 19, al-Suqami and Waleed al-Shehri flew from Fort Lauderdale, Florida, to Freeport, Bahamas, where they had made reservations at the Princess Resort. However, they lacked proper documentation to enter the country, and were stopped upon landing. They returned to Florida the same day, then rented a car.

Wail al-Shehri arrived in the U.S. in June. On June 8, Ahmed al-Haznawi arrived in Florida. He moved in with Jarrah, probably later that month. Sometime after, Jarrah rented a new apartment in Lauderdale-by-the-Sea, Florida, and al-Haznawi moved with him.

On June 29, al-Omari and Salem al-Hazmi arrived in the U.S. in New York City after departing Dubai. Salem had a tourist visa. The pair were probably picked up by Nawaf al-Hazmi on the 30th, as on that day, authorities recorded a traffic accident involving Nawaf on the George Washington Bridge between New York City and New Jersey. Al-Omari then likely stayed with several other hijackers in Paterson, New Jersey, before moving to his own place in Vero Beach, Florida, with his wife and three children.

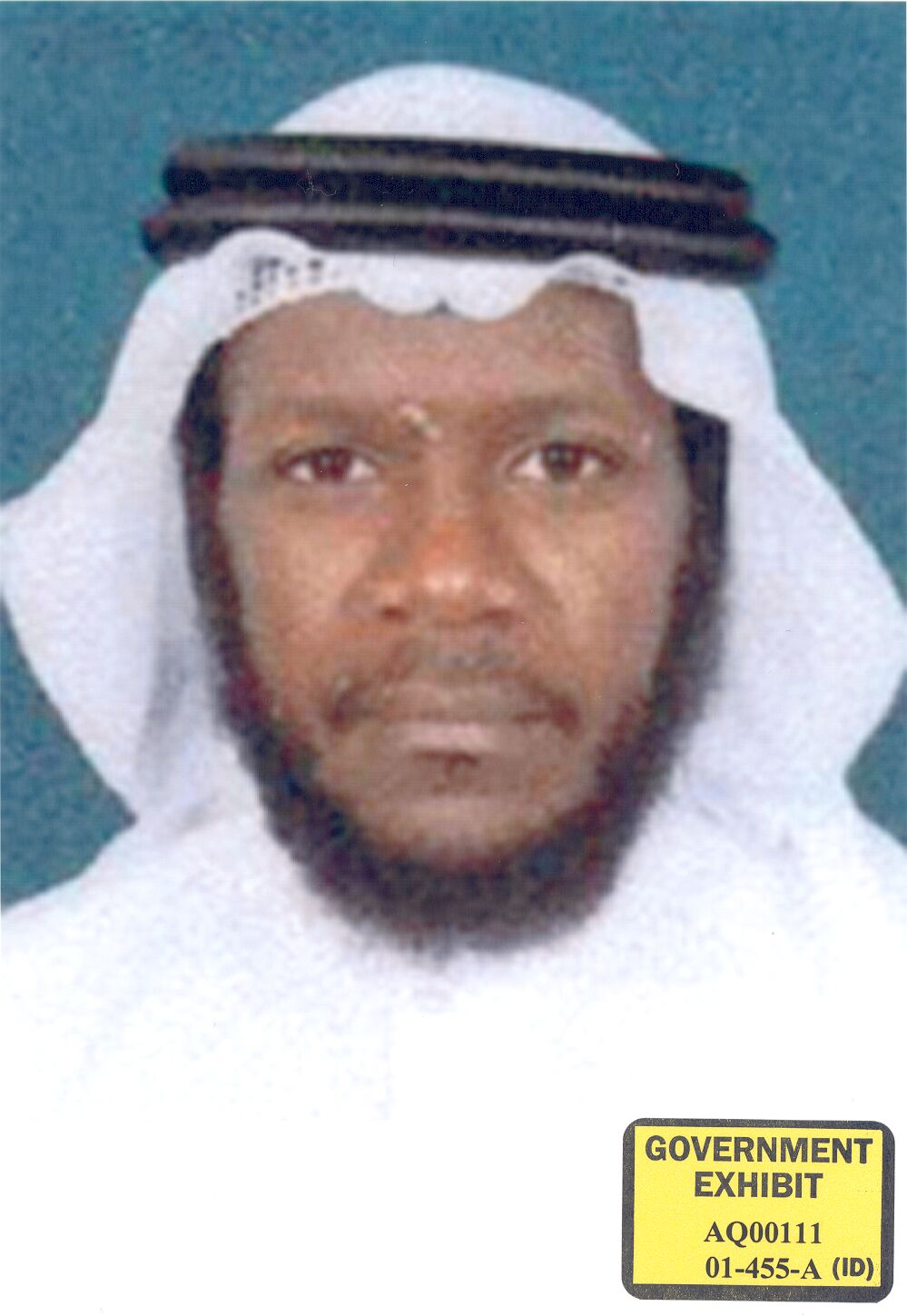
Mustafa al-Hawsawi

In summer 2001, al-Haznawi, al-Suqami, Banihammad, Jarrah, Hamza al-Ghamdi, Mohand al-Shehri, and Saeed al-Ghamdi opened individual bank accounts at SunTrust in Florida. In June, at a Standard Chartered bank in Dubai, conspirator Mustafa al-Hawsawi opened a checking account, and Banihammad opened both checking and savings accounts. In July, al-Hawsawi was given power of attorney over Banihammad's bank accounts, and then used that power to pick up ATM and Visa cards for Banihammad, which were shipped to him in Florida. About a month later, around $4,900 USD was deposited into one of Banihammad's Dubai accounts; in Florida, he withdrew that amount in cash.

At the Ohio Pilot Store around June 20, Moussaoui purchased flight deck videos of Boeing 747 models. Around July 10 or 11, Moussaoui paid for simulator courses of commercial flights at the Pan Am International Flight Academy. Around July 29 to August 2, Moussaoui used payphones to call several numbers in Düsseldorf. In Hamburg around July 30 to 31, bin al-Shibh, using the pseudonym "Ahad Sabet", received about $15,000 USD over two transfers from a sender in the UAE under the name "Hashim Abdulrahman".

In July, Waleed al-Shehri flew in a commercial plane without any other hijackers to San Francisco, and on his way back to Florida, he stayed in Las Vegas for a night. The trip's purpose is unknown; if he was instructed it to perform surveillance of the U.S. airport system, as other hijackers were, the instruction was never documented. Atta purchased a knife in Zurich around July 8.

Months before the attacks, Jarrah's uncle Nazer Jarrah contacted the Lebanese government and the American embassy in Lebanon. He later recalled that he warning them "something very dangerous and serious was afoot with Ziad", as Ziad was becoming more radicalized, and that "[he] and his friends were up to something". Nobody paid attention to the warning. In contrast, Atta complained to bin al-Shibh around this time about Atta's difficulty in getting through to Jarrah amid tensions between them over the viability of the plan. Atta feared he might withdraw from the plot completely. Jarrah did exit the conspiracy at one point, but then rejoined soon after; he might have done this twice. In July, Atta met bin al-Shibh in Spain to go over details of the plot, and make the final decision of what the hijackers' targets were. Bin al-Shibh told Atta that bin Laden wanted the attacks to happen as soon as possible. On July 25, Jarrah flew from the U.S. to Germany. He then met with bin al-Shibh, who convinced him to go through with the operation.

=== August 2001 ===
Around August 1 to 3, at train stations in Düsseldorf and Hamburg, bin al-Shibh sent about $14,000 USD to Moussaoui in Oklahoma. In Oklahoma City around August 3, Moussaoui purchased two knives. Moussaoui was driven to Minnesota around August 9, and around the 10th, he paid the Pan Am International Flight Academy in Minneapolis about $6,300 for training. Between the 13th and 16th, he trained via a Boeing 747 simulator. His possessions around the 16th included: Boeing 747 flight manuals and information software, flight simulator software, a computer disk with info about the aerial application of pesticides, a handheld radio for aviation, fighting gloves, shin guards, and two knives. In Minneapolis around the 17th, federal agents interviewed Moussaoui as to why he was in the U.S.; he "falsely stat[ed] that he was simply interested in learning to fly".

Jarrah may have arrived back in the U.S. on August 5, though some sources indicate he took his pilot's test in the U.S. on August 2, having missed his sister's wedding to do so. Around August 17, Jarrah had a checkride in Fort Lauderdale. Around the 22nd, he purchased schematics of a Boeing 747 cockpit, as well as various GPS equipment, including an antenna.

British-Pakistani man Ahmed Omar Saeed Sheikh, described by the U.S. as "a key figure in the funding operation of al-Qaeda", used a pseudonym to wire $100,000 USD to Atta in this time. Atta then distributed the funds to the other hijackers in Florida. About three weeks before the attacks, the hijackers' targets were assigned to four teams. The U.S. Capitol was called "The Faculty of Law"; the Pentagon, "The Faculty of Fine Arts"; and the World Trade Center, "The Faculty of Town Planning".

The hijackers purchased their flight tickets in August and early September. On August 24, both al-Mihdhar and Moqed tried to purchase flight tickets from American Airlines online, but had technical difficulties in entering their address, and gave up. On the 27th, Nawaf and Salem al-Hazmi purchased tickets for Flight 77. On the 28th, Wail and Waleed purchased for Flight 11, and Atta purchased for himself and al-Omari on the same flight. On the 29th, Banihammad and Hamza al-Ghamdi purchased for Flight 175. The FBI claimed that Hamza also purchased for a "Flight 7950" from Los Angeles to San Francisco, although they did not give the projected date of the flight. On August 31, Moqed and Hanjour went to a travel agency in Totowa, New Jersey, and asked for two tickets on a flight on 9/11. Moqed, who was speaking for Hanjour, then decided to only purchase a ticket for the latter, on Flight 77.

Over a few days in late August and early September, six of the hijackers stayed in Laurel, Maryland, at the Valencia and the Pin-Del Motels; it is unknown if this was to surveil the NSA's headquarters, which were a few miles away.

=== Reasoning for attacking on September 11 ===
It is unknown why September 11 in specific was selected as the attack date. Al-Qaeda, in an act of symbolic terrorism, may have used numerology in choosing it. Before the attacks, the organization's internal name for the plot had been "Operation Holy Tuesday"; September 11, 2001, was a Tuesday. Otherwise, al-Qaeda may have been taking religious revenge for September 11, 1683, when the Muslim Ottoman Empire's militaristic expansion into Europe was ended by the Christian Holy Roman Empire at the Battle of Vienna. The Ottomans became permanently weakened, as did Islam's reach in Europe.

=== Early September 2001 ===
In early September, Jarrah called his father and asked for money for flight training. His father gave him $2000 USD, which investigators believe did not pay for the training, but rather for tickets for Flight 93—for him, al-Nami, al-Haznawi, and Saeed al-Ghamdi. Wail and Waleed phoned American Airlines on September 3 to change their seat assignments for Flight 11, selecting different seats in first class on the other side of the aircraft, as they offered a direct view of the cockpit. On the 5th, al-Mihdhar and Moqed went together to the American Airlines counter at BWI Airport in Baltimore, and purchased for Flight 77.

Seating manifests of the 9/11 flights

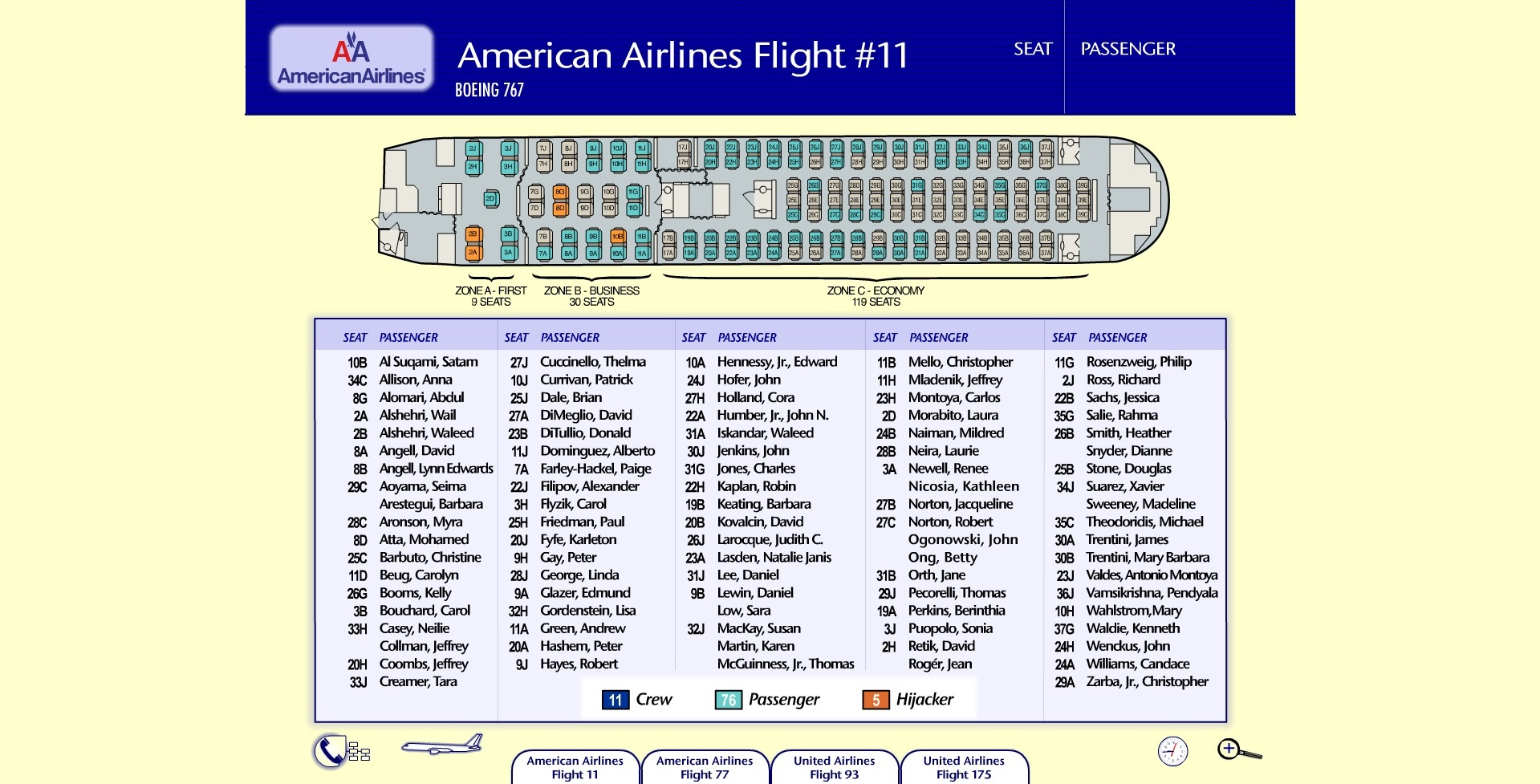
American Airlines Flight 11

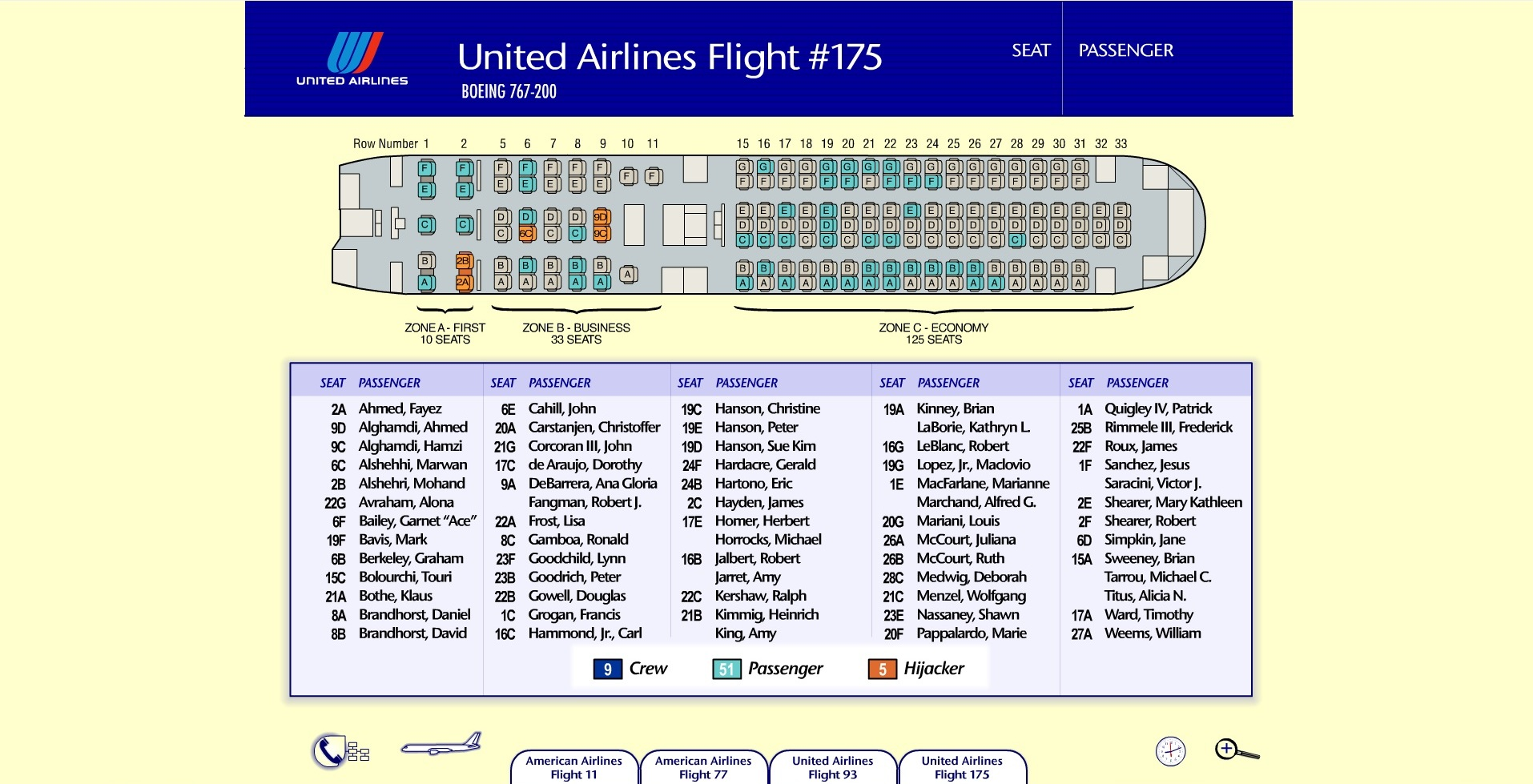
United Airlines Flight 175

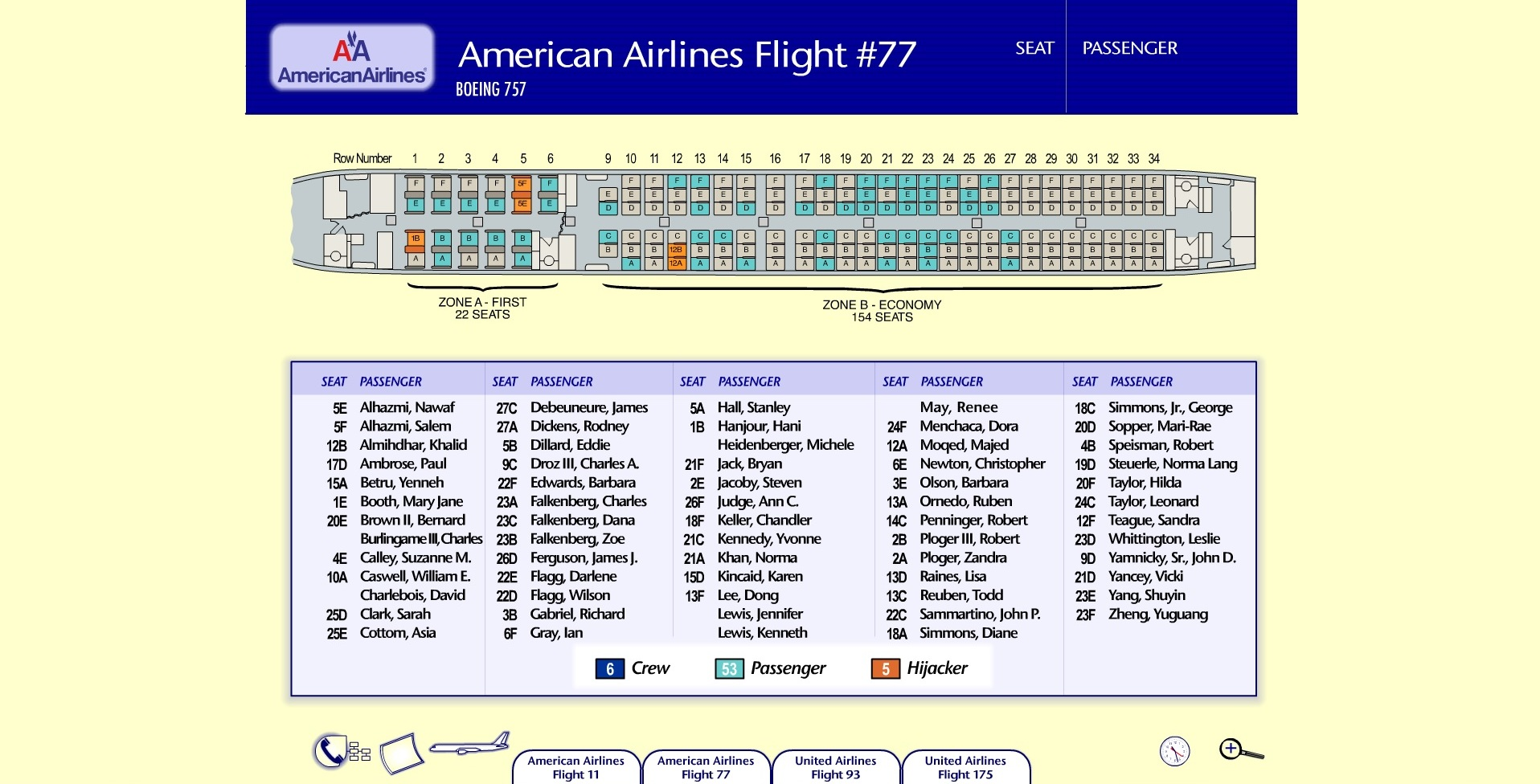
American Airlines Flight 77

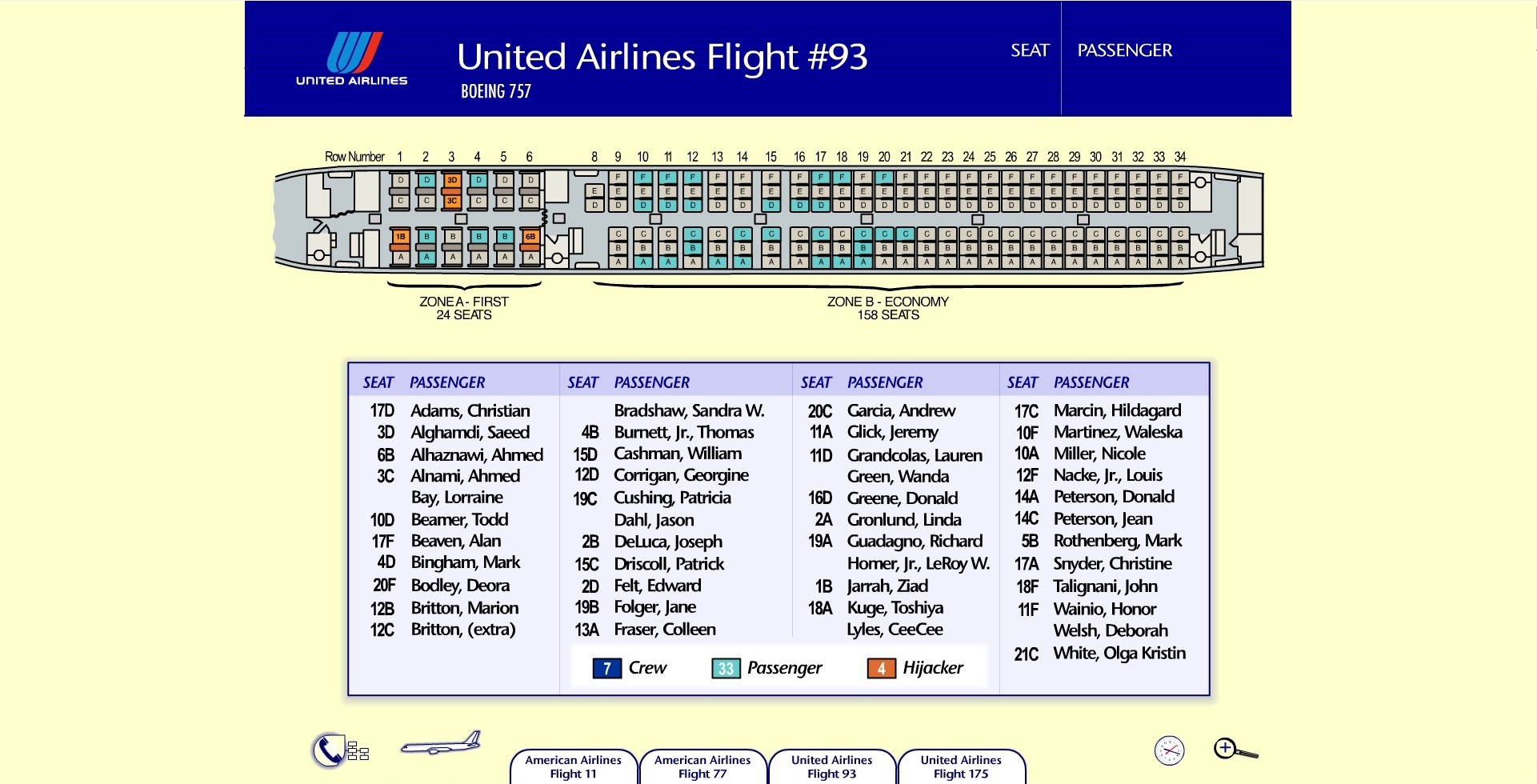
United Airlines Flight 93

In the week before 9/11, al-Hawsawi received excess money from at least four hijackers. The FBI believed this was because they did not want to "die as thieves". First, Banihammad's SunTrust account transferred about $8,055 USD to one of his own Dubai accounts that al-Hawsawi had access to. Al-Hawsawi then received $2,860 and $5,000 from Atta, $5,400 from al-Shehhi; and $5,000 from Waleed al-Shehri. He also received a Fed-Ex package of unknown contents from Atta. On 9/11, about $16,384 was deposited into al-Hawsawi's own Dubai account, and al-Hawsawi transferred about $6,534 from Banihammad's Dubai account into his own—then withdrew almost all the remaining money on Banihammad's account, about $1,631, in cash from an ATM.

Jarrah returned to Florida by September 7. On that day, he and the three other Flight 93 hijackers—al-Nami, al-Haznawi, and Saeed al-Ghamdi—flew from Fort Lauderdale to Newark International Airport. On the 9th, Jarrah called his family, and told them he would be at his cousin's wedding on the 22nd. Just before the attacks, he possibly set up a large mock cockpit made of cardboard boxes in his apartment.

== Morning of September 11, 2001 ==
Between 4:45 to 6:45 a.m. ET on September 11, 2001, Ziad Jarrah made five phone calls to numbers in Lebanon, one in France, and one in Germany—the latter to his girlfriend, Aysel Şengün. At 5:01, he also phoned Marwan al-Shehhi. They spoke for less than a minute, likely to confirm that the plan for the attacks was ready to proceed. He made a similar call to Mohamed Atta, but not to the other hijacker-pilot, Hani Hanjour. Atta and Abdulaziz al-Omari started the day in Portland, Maine. At 6 a.m., they boarded a Colgan Air flight departing Portland International Jetport for Boston, where they met the three other American Airlines Flight 11 hijackers at Logan International Airport.

Nawaf and Salem al-Hazmi at Dulles International Airport in Virginia on 9/11

The three other groups entered their respective airports: United Airlines Flight 175 at Logan, the American Airlines Flight 77 group at Dulles International Airport, and the United Airlines Flight 93 group at Newark International Airport. At the various airport security checkpoints, some of the hijackers set off metal detectors, and were subject to further examinations, like from metal detector hand wands. However, all 19 men were ultimately allowed to continue to their gates. In violation of FAA policy, the security agents likely did not check the carry-on bags of those who set off alarms. The hijackers' bags likely contained stabbing instruments such as box cutters, which were used in the hijackings. However, even if the agents did check the bags, such instruments had been allowed by the FAA before 9/11 to be carried onboard.

The flights took off between 7:59 and 8:42 a.m. On Flight 93, at least one of the four terrorists brought onboard a pamphlet instructing them on how to hijack the plane. It began: "Embrace the will to die and renew allegiance. Familiarize yourself with the plan well from every aspect, and anticipate the reaction and resistance from the enemy." The flights were hijacked between 8:14 to 9:28. Some of the hijackers stabbed various crew members on the flights, and on Flight 11, they sprayed mace in the cabins. The airline pilots were attacked, and al-Shehhi, Atta, Hanjour, and Jarrah assumed their roles as pilots, setting the flights to be on course to their targets in New York, Virginia, and Washington, D.C. On Flight 11, one of the hijackers told the currently-surviving crew and passengers that there was a bomb onboard. Twice during Flight 93's hijacking, Jarrah attempted to radio the cabin that a bomb was onboard by speaking into a voice recorder in the cockpit, but unbeknownst to him, his audio instead went to air traffic controllers in Cleveland. The four crashes happened at 8:46 (Flight 11 into 1 World Trade Center), 9:03 (Flight 175 into 2 World Trade Center), 9:37 (Flight 77 into the Pentagon), and 10:03 (Flight 93 in Pennsylvania).

== Pre-September 11 investigations ==
=== Into Hamburg cell members ===
While the Hamburg cell were active, Mohammed Haydar Zammar was being surveilled by the CIA and German BKA. Germany monitored his phone calls, which included calls to other members of the cell. Through this, the investigators retrieved Marwan al-Shehhi and Mohamed Atta's names and phone numbers. Germany gave some of their info to the CIA. These investigations ultimately did not lead to the intelligence agencies learning of the hijacking plan. After 9/11, German and American intelligence concluded that both of them had not pursued their leads thoroughly. When Said Bahaji joined the Hamburg cell, German authorities were investigating him for associating with Zammar. The investigation was closed, as they could not find evidence of the pair committing crimes. Furthermore, at some point before 9/11, the U.S. became aware that Mamoun Darkazanli was associated with al-Qaeda, and asked German authorities to stop him. However, Germany had no laws at the time prohibiting being part of a foreign terrorist organization, so they did not.

=== Into bin Laden and his planned attack ===
In January 1996, the CIA created an internal investigative unit devoted to tracking bin Laden, the Bin Laden Issue Station, in response to his recent comments about the U.S. Upon his first fatwa in August, the FBI and the U.S. Attorney for the Southern District of New York opened a criminal file on him under the charge of seditious conspiracy. In December 1998, after bin Laden announced upcoming attacks against the U.S., the CIA's Counterterrorist Center reported to president Bill Clinton that al-Qaeda was preparing such an attack, involving trained personnel hijacking airliners.

In the months before 9/11, U.S. federal agencies received numerous warnings from their employees about the attack. CIA director George Tenet later claimed that, in response to those circulating in his agency, he tried to get more employees paying attention to al-Qaeda's plan, but failed. At the time, many agencies did not significantly cooperate with each other on investigations, so the government did not piece these warnings together to make a cohesive picture of the upcoming attack. After 9/11, the FBI alleged that the CIA did not notify them about al-Qaeda's Kuala Lampur summit after its details were intercepted in 1999. The CIA responded by claiming they did email the FBI; the latter then stated they had no records of receiving such an email.

Excerpt from the Phoenix Memo
July 10, 2001

"The purpose of this communication is to advise the Bureau and [its agents in] New York of the possibility of a coordinated effort by USAMA-BIN-LADEN (UBL) to send students to the United States to attend civil aviation universities and colleges. [The FBI in] Phoenix has observed an inordinate number of individuals of investigative interest who are attending or who have attended civil aviation universities and colleges in the State of Arizona."

On July 10, 2001, an FBI field agent in Phoenix named Kenneth Williams wrote the "Phoenix Memo", a warning that bin Laden was sending his followers to Arizona for flight training. Williams sent it to the agency's headquarters and New York field agents, but it was not seen by leadership at the FBI, CIA, or Department of Justice until after the attacks. On August 6, president George W. Bush's daily brief was titled "Bin Ladin Determined to Strike in U.S." [sic]. The NSA received at least 33 warnings about al-Qaeda's plan in the months before the attacks. Director Michael Hayden later testified that, days before 9/11, they received one that said an attack would happen on the 11th, but its wording was not translated until the 12th. It did not mention the attack's type, specific location, or time of day.

== Post-September 11 investigations ==
On 9/11, U.S. intelligence determined al-Qaeda to be the perpetrator of the attacks before the day was over. At 9:52 a.m., the NSA intercepted a phone call between a known associate of bin Laden in Afghanistan, and someone in the Republic of Georgia, the former announcing that he had heard "good news", and that another target was still to be hit. Around 3:30 p.m., Bush convened a meeting of U.S. intelligence officials. George Tenet stated that he was very certain that bin Laden and his associates were the perpetrators, mentioning that U.S. intelligence had checked the manifest of Flight 77, and found three names of known al-Qaeda members.

The FBI considers their investigation into 9/11, PENTTBOM, their largest criminal investigation ever. First involving 70 people, the FBI conducted 180,000 interviews and reviewed millions of pages of documents, and just within the first few months after the attacks, looked into more than 250,000 leads. Thousands of agents were dispatched to other countries for field research. The FBI checked daily reports from CIA and military intelligence officials, as well as reports of interrogations at U.S. facilities across the world. Thousands of leads were useless, leading FBI Director Robert Mueller to claim his agents were "trying to find the needle in the haystack". Nonetheless, by 2004, other investigative panels within the U.S. government accused PENTTBOM of not being thorough enough.

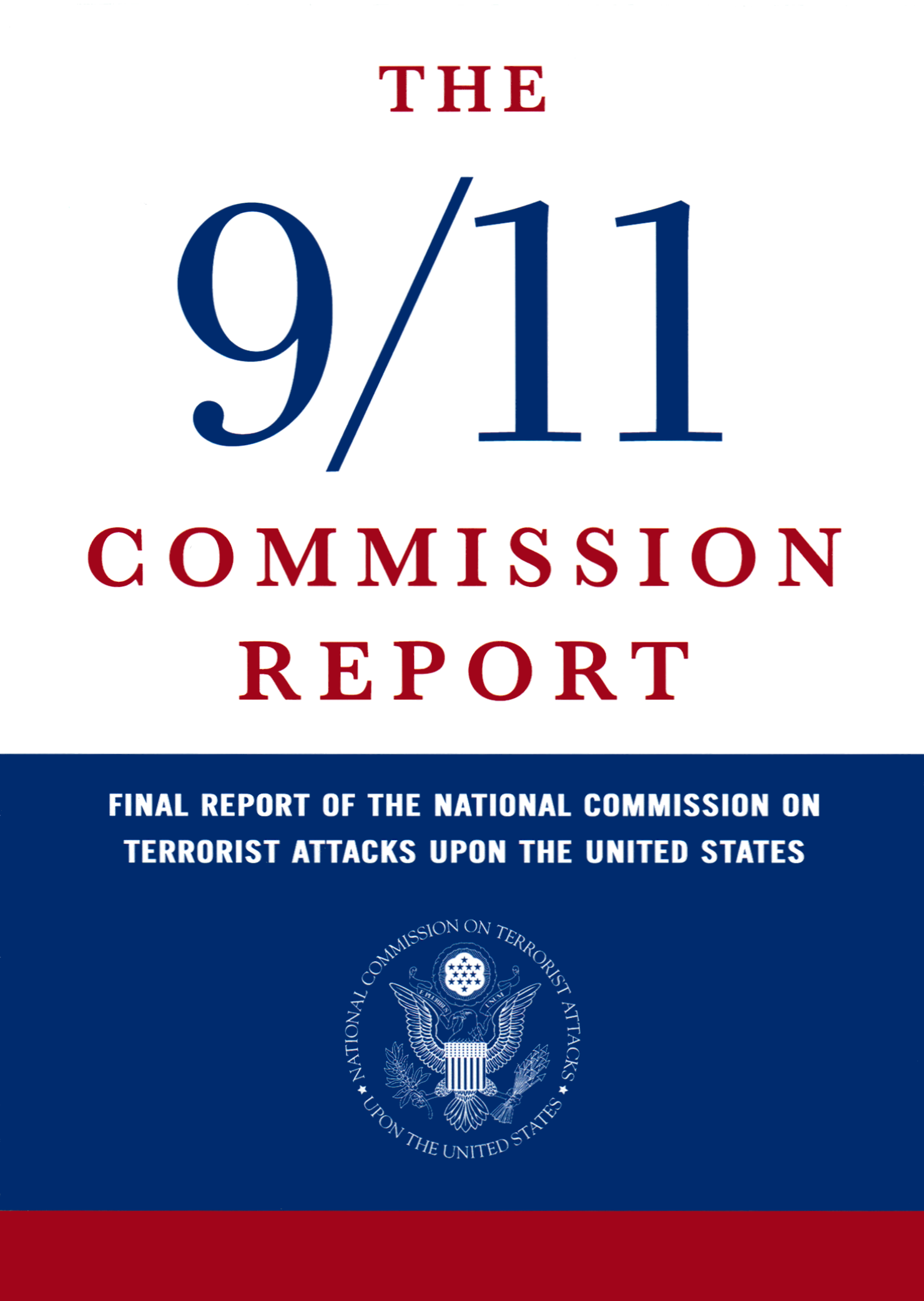
The cover of the 9/11 Commission Report

In October 2001, the Bush administration launched Operation Green Quest, a federal investigative unit which, in part, sought the sources of the funds al-Qaeda had used to plan 9/11. In 2002, the U.S. Senate and House's intelligence committees investigated the attacks generally, via the Joint Inquiry into Intelligence Community Activities before and after the Terrorist Attacks of September 11, 2001. That year, Congress also founded the 9/11 Commission, an independent committee planned to make a "complete account of the circumstances surrounding [the] attacks", which would determine policies the U.S. government need enact to prevent similar attacks in the future. 80 people were full-time members, including staff. The Commission held reoccurring public hearings on the investigation's progress. Its final report, the 9/11 Commission Report, was released on July 22, 2004. In 570 pages, it determined that the U.S. intelligence community's "lack of imagination" stopped the government from understanding the threat al-Qaeda's posed to the country while the organization planned 9/11. It also estimated that al-Qaeda had "spent somewhere between $400,000 and $500,000" on the plot.

=== Into Saudi involvement ===
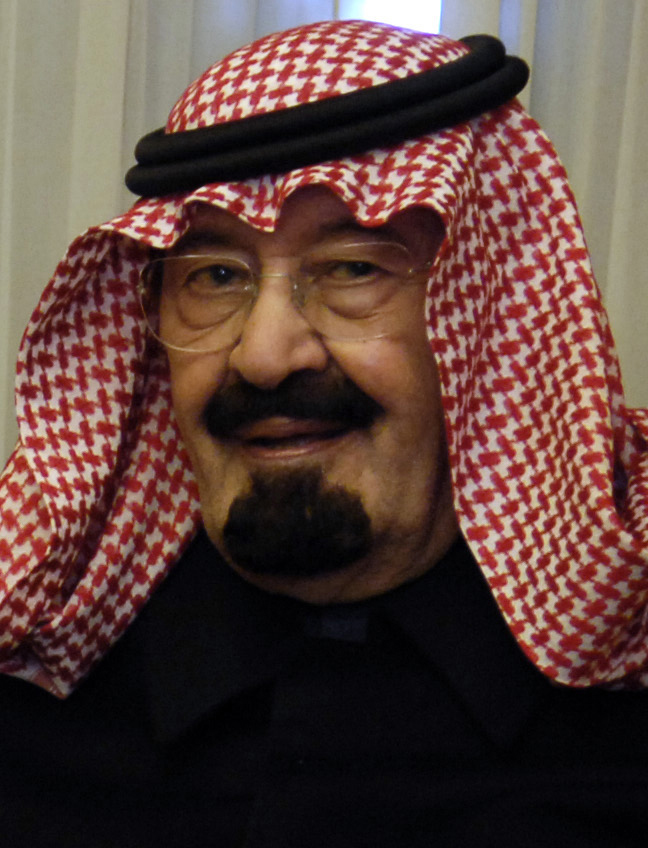
Crown Prince Abdullah

The 9/11 Commission Report stated that that the "origin of [al-Qaeda's] funds remains unknown", and that they "have seen no evidence that any foreign government or foreign government official supplied any funding." Despite this conclusion, and bin Laden having been exiled by the House of Saud in 1991, al-Qaeda is alleged by some U.S. investigators to have received funding from Saudi Arabia in planning 9/11. Saudi Arabia has denied this. The country's de facto ruler at the time of the attacks was Crown Prince Abdullah.

Prior to 9/11—while unaware of the royals' potential connection to al-Qaeda's plot—multiple U.S. intelligence agencies investigated possible financial ties between them and bin Laden. In June 2001, a "high-placed member of a U.S. intelligence agency" told the BBC that after George W. Bush was inaugurated as president that January, his administration forced the agencies to stop looking into any connections. One of the investigations was being done by Robert Wright Jr. at the FBI. He was focusing on Yassin Kadi, a Saudi businessman who owned Ptech, a company which supplied computer systems to U.S. government agencies and NATO. In October 2001, the U.S. officially identified him as one of bin Laden's primary financiers. They discovered that he had led the Muwafaq Foundation, an arm of al-Qaeda. Ptech's other higher-ups were also revealed to be connected to Islamic extremism. In 2002, Wright claimed 9/11 was "a direct result of the incompetence of the FBI's International Terrorism Unit", who halted his investigation, as he felt he would have gained advanced knowledge of the attacks if he was allowed to continue.

In 2002, 28 pages of the Joint Inquiry into Intelligence Community Activities' final report were not released to the public, at the order of the Bush administration. Bipartisan congressional leaders criticized the decision. In 2004, Senator Bob Graham, chairman of the Senate's Select Committee on Intelligence during the inquiry, stated that some details of al-Qaeda's alleged financing by Saudi Arabia were in the pages. All 28 were declassified by president Barack Obama in 2016; the inquiry was revealed to have written that, "while in the United States, some of [the] hijackers were in contact with, and received support or assistance from, individuals who may be connected to the Saudi government".

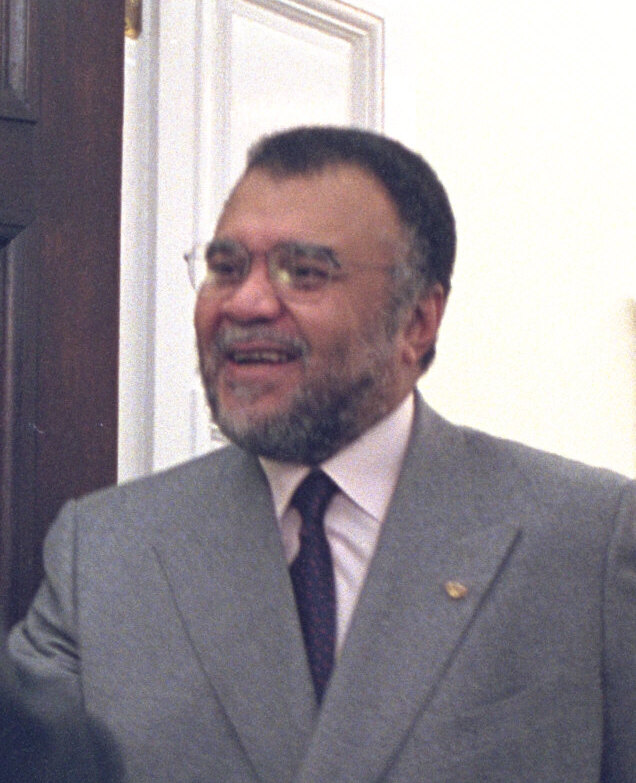
Prince Bandar

From around 1999 to 2002, a bank account under the name of Saudi Princess Haifa, the wife of then-Saudi ambassador to the U.S., Prince Bandar, sent thousands of dollars USD to Majida Dwaikat, the wife of a man named Osama Basnan—Khalid al-Mihdhar and Nawaf al-Hazmi's friend while they were in San Diego. This information was leaked in November 2002, sourced from an FBI investigation. Time subsequently wrote that the leak "[has] thrown the FBI and Justice Department on the defensive", as both denied that the revelation was evident of Saudi funding of al-Qaeda. In San Diego, Al-Mihdhar and al-Hazmi may also have been connected to al-Qaeda via Omar al-Bayoumi, who some investigators suspect was a Saudi intelligence agent. In the aforementioned 2001 search of his U.K. apartment, investigators found an address book with contact details of Saudi government officials. In 2024, the FBI stated that al-Bayoumi taped his 1999 Washington, D.C. video while standing next to two Saudi diplomats who had ties to al-Qaeda at that time.

In 2015, during Zacarias Moussaoui's trial over involvement in 9/11, he testified that members of the House of Saud, including Prince Bandar, had helped finance the attacks. In a statement, the Saudi government noted that Moussaoui's own lawyers presented evidence of him being mentally incompetent during the trial.

=== Into Pakistani involvement ===
In October 2001, U.S. authorities were reported as seeking the removal of Mahmud Ahmed as head of Pakistan's Inter-Services Intelligence agency (ISI), as the FBI had recently found that Ahmed Omar Saeed Sheikh wired the aforementioned $100,000 to Mohamed Atta at Mahmud's request. The FBI determined this after looking into the cell phone company Sheikh had been subscribed to. The allegation had severe implications for the privacy of U.S. intelligence operations prior to 9/11, as Ahmed had had a professional relationship with numerous American officials, including Bush's vice president Dick Cheney. Soon after the allegation was publicized, he resigned as head of the ISI. In 2002, numerous Pakistani officials were reported to have rejected the FBI's theory, instead believing that Sheikh's money came from the CIA.

=== Into hijackers' Maine and Nevada trips ===
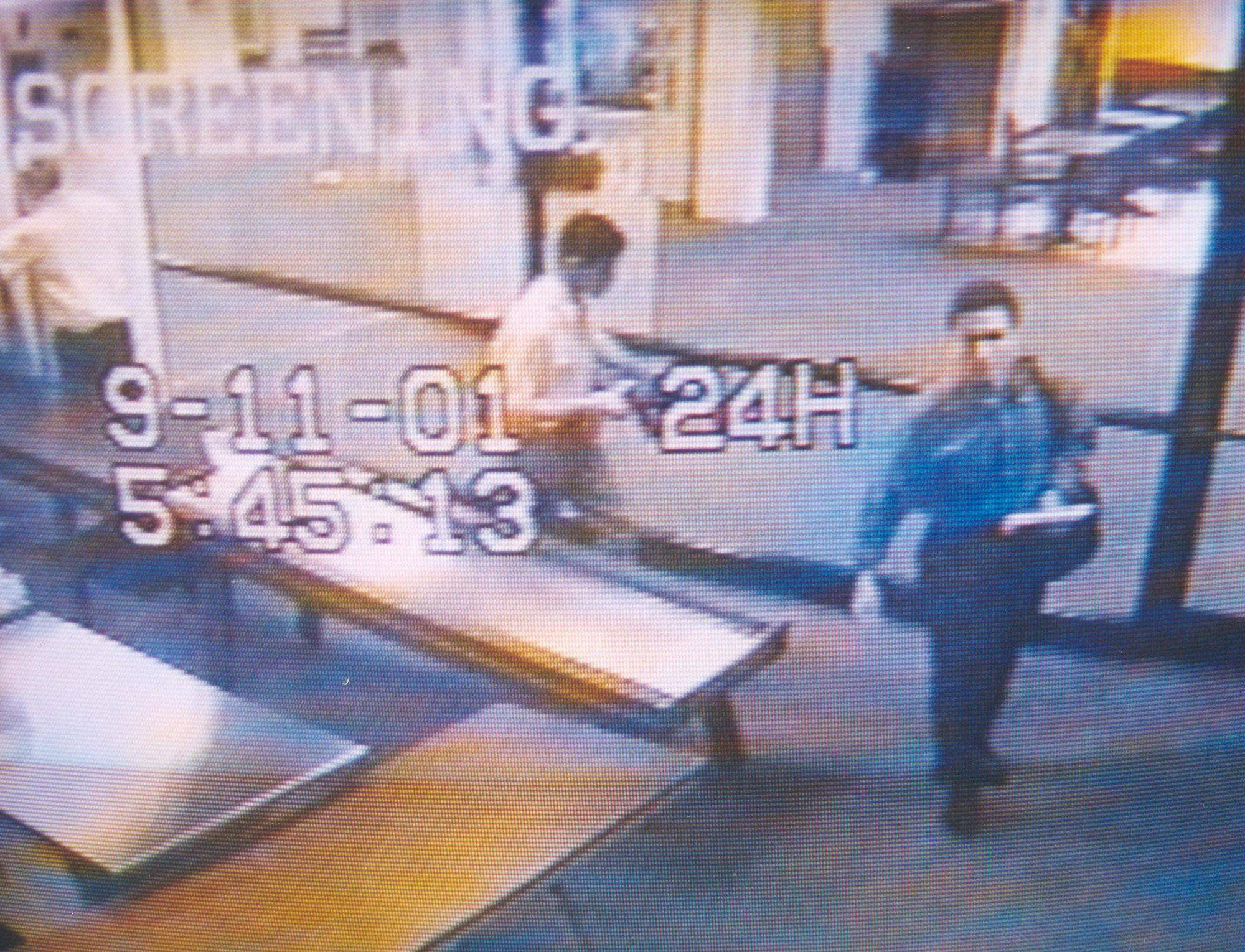
Al-Omari (in white, center) and Atta (in blue) at Portland International Jetport in Maine on 9/11

Al-Omari and Atta's presence in Portland, Maine, on September 10 and 11 was publicized upon the attacks; by the end of that week, many of the city's residents told investigators they had seen Atta and other hijackers there the previous summer, which could imply the city was home to a terrorist cell. The FBI investigated the claims, and found them unsubstantiated. Portland Police Chief Michael Chitwood also investigated them; he could not find any evidence of a cell, yet his investigation was ended prematurely, as "I was told I needed to stop investigating and let the FBI handle it." As of 2020, why the hijackers went to Las Vegas several times in uncertain, and as of 2021, the Portland visit could possibly have been an attempt by al-Omari and Atta to obscure their movements from any investigators.

== Conspirators' and suspects' aftermaths ==
=== Conspirators who were convicted or indefinitely detained ===
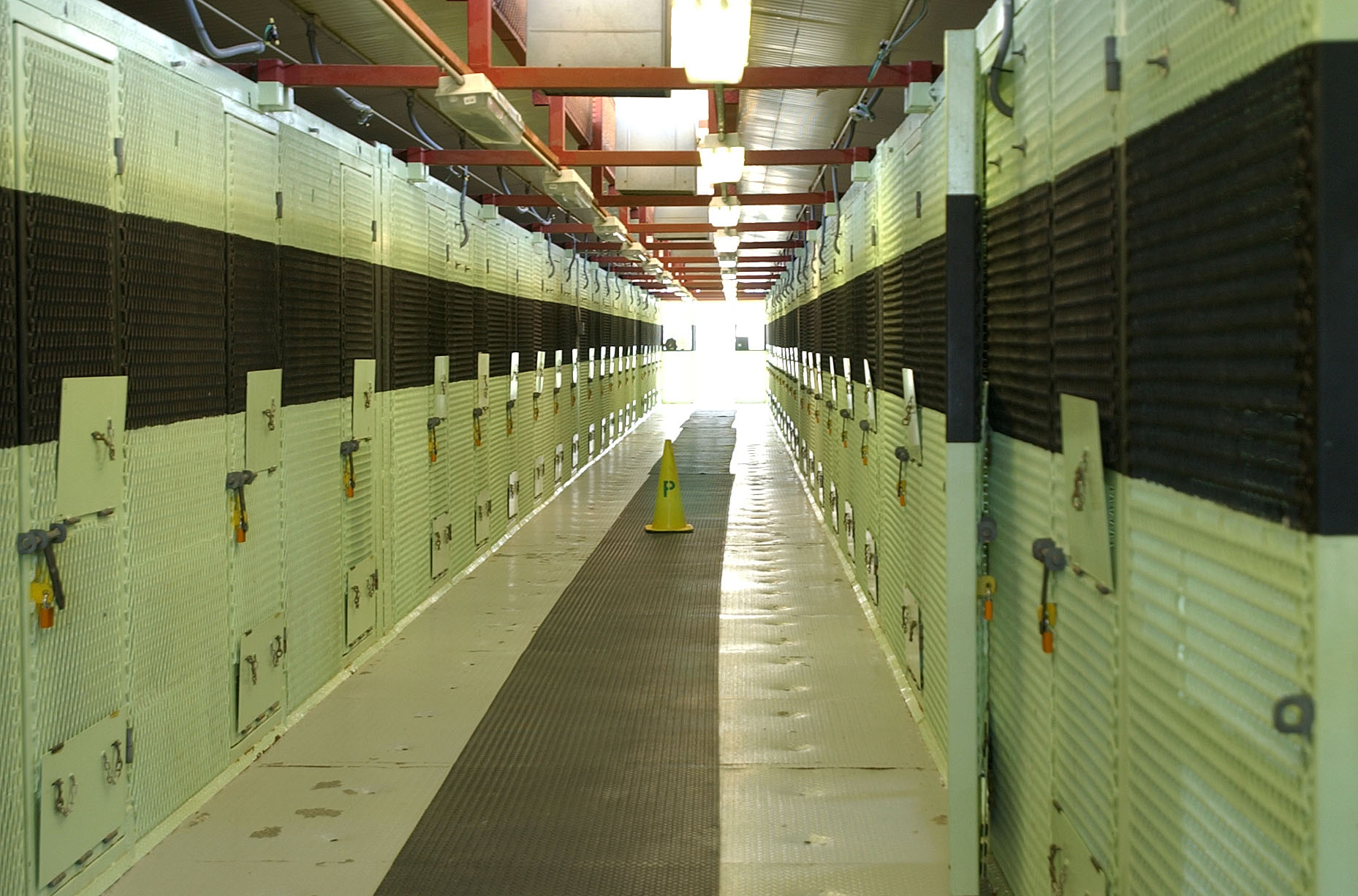
A cell block at Camp Delta, part of the Guantanamo Bay detention camp

After 9/11, the CIA opened numerous secret prisons, or black sites, across the world, while the U.S. opened the Guantanamo Bay detention camp in Cuba and the Bagram prison in Afghanistan—all to house confirmed or suspected militants and terrorists. At those places, the U.S. deployed torture methods, officially named "enhanced interrogation techniques", against prisoners, sometimes in an attempt to get info about 9/11, or al-Qaeda generally. Research has found torture is not effective as an interrogation technique, and often leads to the victims giving false information. The FBI used the U.S. government's reports of interrogations at Guantanamo in the PENTTBOM investigation.

==== Khalid Sheikh Mohammed and Ramzi bin al-Shibh ====
Khalid Sheikh Mohammed and bin al-Shibh hid in Pakistan after 9/11. In April 2002, Al Jazeera journalist Yosri Fouda met with them while blindfolded in their safe house in Karachi; Mohammed later said this was the first time a journalist ever interviewed him. The two admitted to their role in the attacks. When Fouda asked them, "Did you do it?", Mohammed replied that they did, as he headed al-Qaeda's "military committee", and bin al-Shibh was "the coordinator" of the attacks. The interview was the first time the public—even the CIA and FBI—knew Mohammed to be the third-in-command of al-Qaeda, and that "his importance to the group as a terrorist organizer" was even greater than bin Laden. Mohammed also revealed that al-Qaeda discussed plane crash targets years prior to the attacks, considered hitting nuclear facilities, and had a "department of martyrs". Furthermore, he handed Fouda a box of CDs and Mini-Cassettes containing info about al-Qaeda to take with him. One of the items featured a will statement of one of the hijackers.

Bin al-Shibh was captured in 2002, then tortured at CIA black sites for four years. While in custody, his lawyer put out a statement from him that the Hamburg cell's only members were him, al-Shehhi, Atta, and Jarrah, despite eleven members being known. He was transferred to Guantanamo, where he was also tortured. He is charged at the camp's court with planning 9/11, and intends to defend himself from the charges, despite admitting to his involvement. In a trial that started in 2012 and continued for years, he was jointly prosecuted with Mohammed, Ammar al-Baluchi, Mustafa al-Hawsawi, and Walid bin Attash. In 2023, the court found bin al-Shibh was not mentally able to defend himself in a joint case due to psychological trauma from torture. He was moved to a separate, tentative trial.

Khalid Sheikh Mohammed was captured in 2003, then tortured at CIA black sites for three years. He was waterboarded 183 times, deprived of sleep, and forced to be nude. He was transferred to Guantanamo. At some point before the 9/11 Commission Report, when he was being interrogated, Mohammed denied knowing Omar al-Bayoumi.

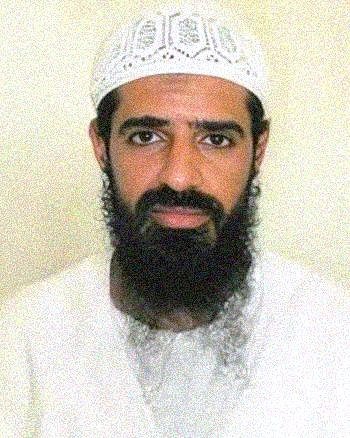
Walid bin Attash

==== Mustafa al-Hawsawi and Walid bin Attash ====
Al-Hawsawi was captured in 2003. He was tortured at CIA black sites for three years, which his attorneys claim gave him lasting damage to his rectum. He was transferred to Guantanamo, where he has repeatedly waived his right to be in court, claiming that he finds it too uncomfortable to sit in, even on his provided donut pillow. Walid bin Attash is also detained at Guantanamo.

==== Mohammed Haydar Zammar ====
After 9/11, Germany believed Mohammed Haydar Zammar had connections to the attacks, but when he made plans to visit Morocco in October, German authorities did not have enough evidence on him to deny him a temporary passport. In June 2002, Morocco announced they had arrested Zammar, and that the U.S. helped them to deport him to Syria for interrogation by American officials. Zammar was imprisoned there until 2014, when he was released in a prisoner exchange between Syria and Islamic militant group Ahrar al-Sham. He then joined the Islamic State militant organization as they were invading Syria, and did numerous jobs for them. In 2018, he was captured in Syria, and imprisoned there again.

==== Mounir el-Motassadeq ====
Mounir el-Motassadeq was arrested in Germany shortly after 9/11. During his trial over involvement in the Hamburg cell, German prosecutors requested the U.S. that both bin al-Shibh and Khalid Sheikh Mohammed, by then in custody, be made to testify in his trial. The U.S. refused. He was still found guilty, but later, his conviction was thrown out, when a court determined his trial should have included those testimonies. El-Motassadeq was released from prison, then arrested again, and a new trial began. He was convicted in 2006, and imprisoned from 2007 to 2018. Upon his release, he was deported to Morocco.

=== Conspirators who were not convicted ===
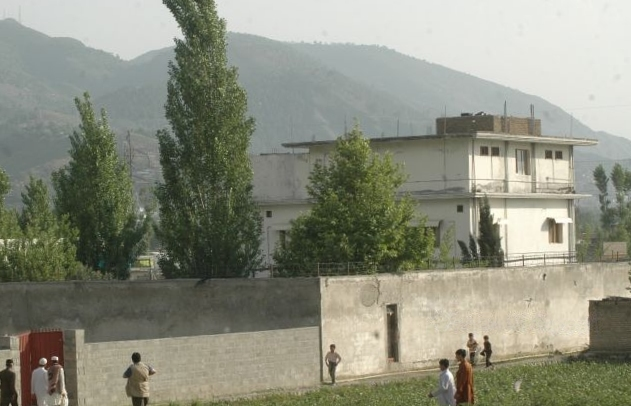
Bin Laden's compound in Abbottabad, Pakistan, in 2011

==== Osama bin Laden ====
From 2001 to 2011, the U.S. engaged in a widespread manhunt for Osama bin Laden, who, some time after 9/11, left Afghanistan for a safe house in Abbottabad, Pakistan. He had narrowly escaped death from a U.S. assault during the Battle of Tora Bora in December 2001. A decade later, U.S. intelligence tracked a courier of bin Laden to the compound, which the courier frequently entered and exited. On May 1, 2011, in Operation Neptune Spear, a team of U.S. Navy SEALs raided the compound and killed bin Laden.

==== Abdelghani Mzoudi ====
Abdelghani Mzoudi was arrested in Germany, and trialed over his role in the cell. Like with el-Motassadeq, the U.S. did not allow bin al-Shibh and Mohammed to testify in his trial. He was acquitted in 2004, as without the testimonies, prosecutors did not have a strong enough case against him. In 2005, he was also deported to Morocco.

==== Mamoun Darkazanli ====
Mamoun Darkazanli was not arrested for being in the Hamburg cell. In 2004, Spain issued a European Union (EU) warrant for his arrest over alleged involved in the Madrid train bombings earlier that year. An attempt to extradite Darkazanli back to Spain was blocked by a judge in Germany, and then German authorities found that the EU arrest warrant violated Germany's constitution, so in 2005, he was freed.

The al-Quds Mosque stayed open after 9/11, despite Germany knowing it had ties to jihadist terrorism. During this time, it possibly continued having a connection to al-Qaeda via a frequent visitor named Ahmad Sidiqi. In 2010, Sidiqi was captured in Afghanistan, and interrogated at Bagram prison. According to the U.S., he told them that he was involved in al-Qaeda's plot to conduct terrorist attacks across Europe. German authorities then raided and shut down the mosque for links to terrorism. Al-Qaeda's plot was ultimately foiled.

==== Said Bahaji, Zakariya Essabar, and Naamen Meziche ====
Shortly after 9/11, Germany stated that likely, Said Bahaji and Zakariya Essabar had recently moved to Pakistan or Afghanistan. Naamen Meziche is known to have left Germany for Afghanistan on or around the 11th. As of 2011, he is rumored to have died there, while Essabar's whereabouts are still unknown. From 2001 to 2010, evidence was found supporting Bahaji's entry into Pakistan. Between 2001 and 2004, letters and emails he sent to relatives in Germany came from somewhere in Pakistan. At some point, he may have associated with the Pakistani Taliban, who, during the war on terror, captured de facto Pakistan government territory; in 2009, Pakistan took back a Taliban-controlled town, and found there a supposed Pakistani passport issued to Bahaji. Sidiqi allegedly claimed to have met Bahaji at an Islamic militant camp in Pakistan around 2009. According to the U.N. Security Council, Bahaji died at the Pakistan–Afghanistan border in 2013. However, as of 2025, Germany still has an active arrest warrant for him.

=== Suspects ===
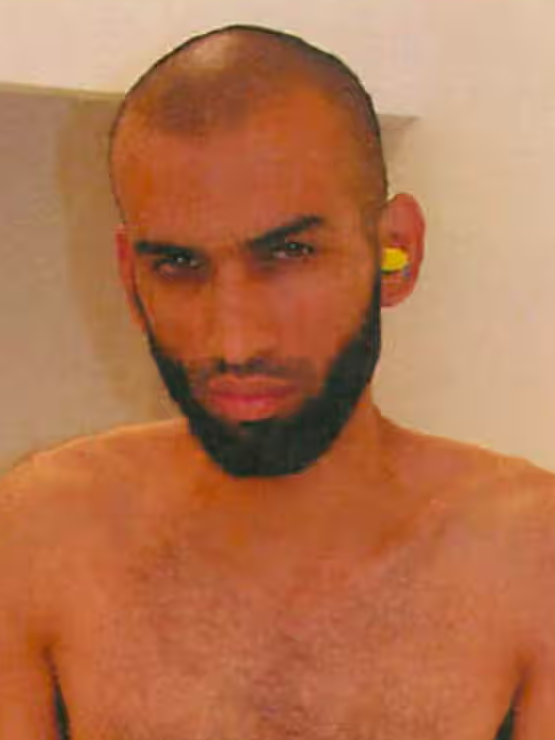
Ammar al-Baluchi being forced to be nude, likely at a CIA black site in Romania in 2004

==== Ammar al-Baluchi ====
Ammar al-Baluchi was captured in 2003. For three years at CIA black sites, he was subject to 1,100 interrogations, with some questions being provided by the FBI. He was regularly beaten, forced to be nude, and allegedly received brain damage from being repeatedly thrown at a wall. In one instance, al-Baluchi was simultaneously waterboarded, forced to be nude, and forced to stand for 82 hours, causing sleep deprivation. He was transferred to Guantanamo. In 2007, prosecutors alleged he admitted guilt in planning 9/11; in 2025, a judge denied this, claiming al-Baluchi's psychological trauma caused a forced confession.

==== Mohamedou Ould Slahi ====
The 9/11 Commission claimed that Mohamedou Ould Slahi, a Mauritanian businessman living in Duisburg, Germany, played a role in the Hamburg cell joining al-Qaeda after meeting "Khalid al-Masri"; supposedly, on the train to Chechnya, "al-Masri" asked the cell to visit Slahi, who warned them it was hard to enter Chechnya, and that they should instead visit al-Qaeda in Afghanistan. Slahi had trained with al-Qaeda in 1991, but claims he soon severed ties with them." Soon after 9/11, he was captured by the U.S., and sent to Guantanamo, where he was tortured during interrogations. He was freed in 2016, when a court found that the Commission's findings regarding him and "al-Masri" were false.

== See also ==
- Timeline of the September 11 attacks
- September 11 attacks advance-knowledge conspiracy theories
- Brussels Islamic State terror cell
- Planning of the January 6 United States Capitol attack
