= Intelligence field =

Collection of people and organizations dedicated to intelligence

The intelligence field, also known as the intelligence business, the intelligence establishment, the intelligence complex, the intelligence industry, the field of intelligence, or the business of intelligence is the global industry revolving around intelligence in all of its forms. The intelligence field is composed of people, groups, and organizations who deal—directly or indirectly—with intelligence, and/or support those people that do.

This industry contains; lawyers (not only those practicing intelligence law), professors and academics (not just those in intelligence studies), diplomats, biologists, chemists, astronomers, photographers, videographers, information technology specialists, historians, economists, data scientists, graphic designers, psychologists and profilers, essayists, intelligence analysts, c-suite executives, hackers, coders, and software developers, among others. Individuals employed by intelligence organizations are usually fully employed officers of intelligence agencies called intelligence officers.

Those persons popularly called "spies" make up only a small part of the intelligence field—so small that some scholars have even argued that the work of spying, called espionage, is anachronistic and unnecessary in the modern intelligence field. In other words, just as not everyone in the film industry is an actor, not everyone in the intelligence field is a spy, or even deals with intelligence.

In sum, Hager Ben Jaffel and Sebastian Larsson write:

...doing intelligence today could mean anything from informing high politics and producing risk assessments, to dealing with the mundanities of the everyday labor of law enforcement, to managing vast databases involving intricate computerized surveillance solutions.

One derogatory term that has been used to describe the intelligence field, especially in the United States, is the intelligence-industrial complex.

== Global industry leaders ==
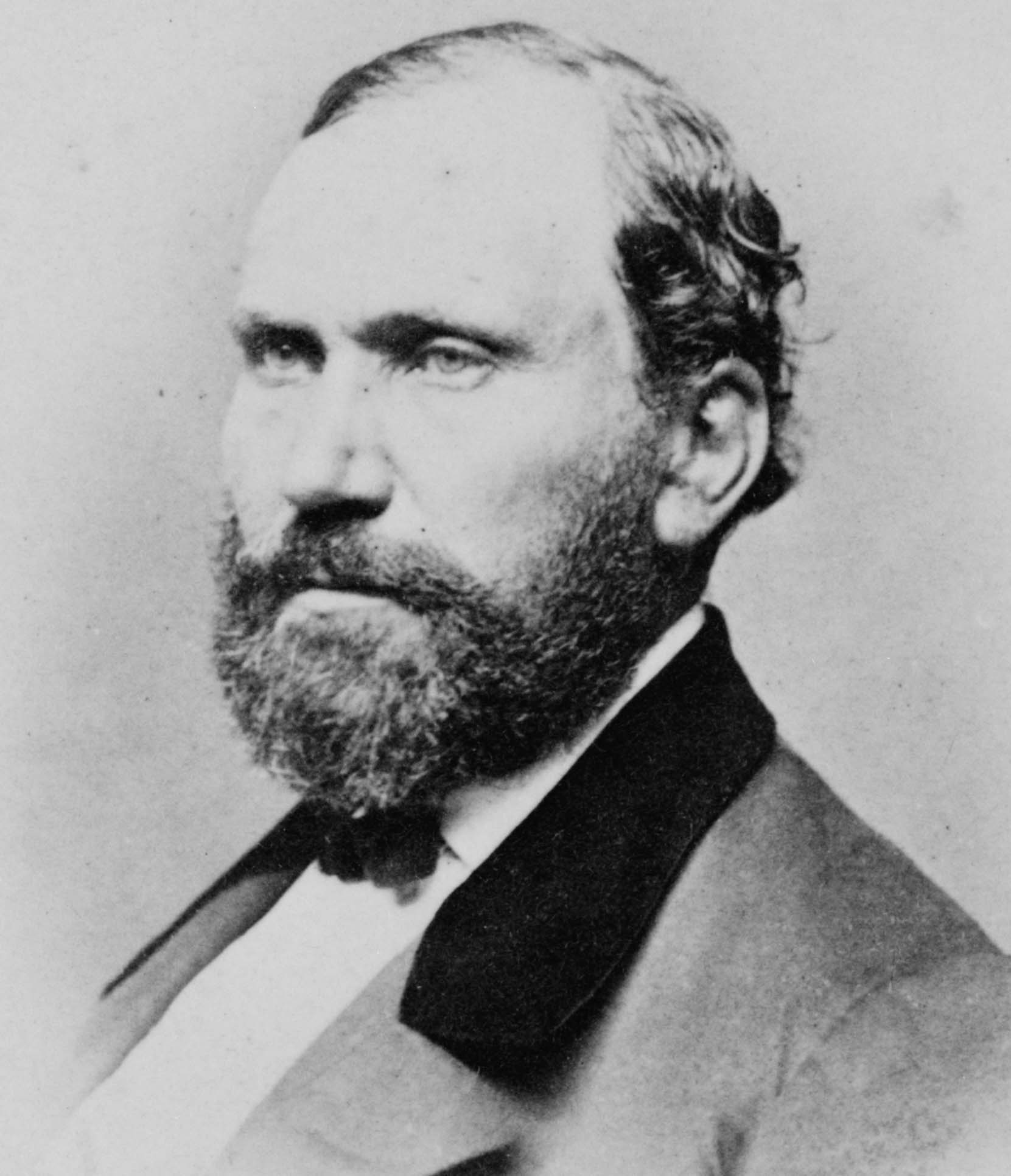
Allan Pinkerton was formerly the global industry leader of the intelligence field, at one point, possessing for the Pinkerton Agency more reserves than the US Army, mostly used for union busting. Pinkerton is nowhere near the global leader today, purchased in the early 2000s by Securitas AB and relegated to basic security duties.

Due to the secretive, often covert, nature of the intelligence field, gaining accurate employment figures or profit and revenue figures in either the public sector or private sector anywhere is difficult for data scientists, human resources officers, or economists. From an etymological perspective, when the professions of intelligence were being developed, the intelligence field deliberately chose words that were mundane and obtuse, so their enemies would not know what these jobs really were. Job postings are even today often intentionally or unintentionally mislabeled by employers. Most of the employment figures below are best-estimates.

The one thing that is not measured below is the effectiveness of the industry leaders, because, while those measurements are often performed within the industry, those reports are mostly kept secret or classified.

=== Public sector ===
Intelligence communities are the collective efforts of a country surrounding intelligence – but confusingly, most of the employment studies today only measure the size of individual intelligence agencies. It is inadequate to measure individual agencies alone, because, for example, the Central Intelligence Agency (CIA) is only 1/18th of the entire United States Intelligence Community (USIC) – meaning that the CIA is only one of 18 intelligence agencies in the United States. Comparing the size of the CIA to the size of the KGB is not adequate, because it does not include all of the other people in those governments employed in the industry.

The following are, therefore, the top leading intelligence communities where figures are found. These rankings incorporate both the number of employees and the owned physical assets of these communities, like access to satellites and deployment times:

Rank	Intelligence Community	Estimated employees	Annual budget
1	United States Intelligence Community (USIC)	100,000 –200,000	$101.6 billion (+)
2	Chinese intelligence community	?	(allocated from defense budget)
3	Russian Intelligence Community	?	(allocated from the ₽3.5 – ₽3.91 trillion national defense budget)
4	Israeli intelligence community	?	₪20 billion
5	Indian intelligence community		₹4,2343 crore (+/- thousands)
6	Pakistani Intelligence Community		15-20% of ₨1.8 – 2.55 trillion
7	United Kingdom Intelligence Community (UKIC)	15,550 (+)	£4.2 billion
8	Australian Intelligence Community (NIC)	7,000 – 10,000	$44.6 million – $2.05 billion
9	France	20,000	€67 million
10	Germany	10,000 (+)	€1 billion
11	Japan	5,000	(allocated from defense budget)
12	South Korea	60,000	(allocated from defense budget)

The ten most powerful government intelligence agencies, when compared to the relative size of their intelligence communities, are the following:

Rank	Intelligence agency	Estimated employees	Annual budget	Country
1	Central Intelligence Agency	21,575 – 22,000	$15 billion (+)	United States
2	Secret Intelligence Service (MI6)	3,500 (+)	N/A (shares an account with MI5 and GCHQ)	United Kingdom
3	Mossad	7,000 (+)	₪10 billion	Israel
4	Research & Analysis Wing	5,000 (+)	$100 – 500 million	India
5	Federal Security Service	200,000 – 500,000	?	Russia
6	Ministry of State Security	800,000 (+)	?	China
7	Bundesnachrichtendienst	6,500 (+)	€1.6 billion (+)	Germany
8	Inter-Services Intelligence	10,000 (+)	₨200 – 300 billion	Pakistan
9	Australian Secret Intelligence Service			Australia
10	Directorate General for External Security	7,200	€1 billion (+)	France

=== Private sector ===
Many of the companies below are involved in more industries than only the intelligence field. The following are the most powerful private sector intelligence agencies in the world:

Rank	Company	Estimated employees	Annual revenue	Country
1	Kroll Inc.	6,500	$1.31 billion	United States
2	K2 Integrity	350	$74 – 121 million	United States
3	Surefire Intelligence	50	$5 – 30 million	United States
4	Booz Allen Hamilton	34,200	$2.9 billion	United States
5	Constellis Holdings	22,000	$1 – 5 billion	United States
6	AggregateIQ	12–50	$6 million	Canada
7	Hakluyt & Company	200	£130 million	United Kingdom
8	Black Cube	50–200	$1 – 5 million	Israel
9	Earth League International	50 (+)	N/A (Nonprofit)	United States
?	Leidos	48,000	$16 billion	United States
?	CACI International	25,500	$9 million	United States
?	Science Applications International Corporation	24,000	$7.5 million	United States
?	Palantir Technologies	4,000 (+/-)	$3 billion	United States
?	5 Stones Intelligence	200 (+)	$15 – 16 million	
?	Pinkerton	500	N/A (now owned by Securitas)	United States
?	Amazon	UNKNOWN	UNKNOWN	United States
?	Alphabet Inc.	UNKNOWN	UNKNOWN	United States

=== Criminal intelligence ===
Where they do exist, the leading criminal intelligence organizations are the following:

Rank	Name	Estimated size	Annual budget	Parent department
	Beijing State Security Bureau	?	?	Ministry of State Security
	United States Postal Inspection Service	2,500	$150 million	United States Postal Service
	Counterterrorism and Intelligence Bureau	360(+)	$230,000	New York City Police Department
	SO15	1,800	?	Metropolitan Police
	Counter-Terrorism and Special Operations Bureau	300(+)	$650,000	Los Angeles Police Department
	Bureau of Counter Terrorism	1,300	$2.5 million	Chicago Police Department
	Intelligence Bureau	?	?	Los Angeles County Sheriff's Department
	Regional Operations and Intelligence Center	?	$250 million	New Jersey State Police
	Specialized Investigations	?	?	Miami-Dade Police Department
	Police Intelligence Department	15,000	?	Singapore Police Force

== Industrial cultivation ==
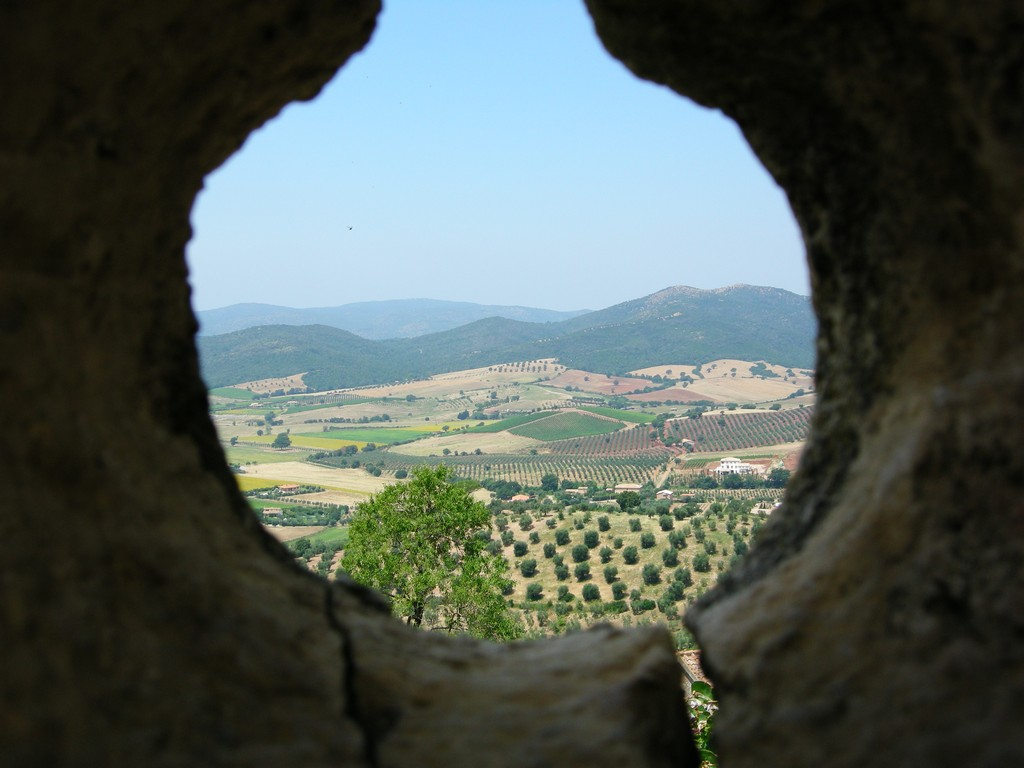
Clients of intelligence products usually desire a sight picture of their operating environment to help them make decisions.

The global intelligence field, and especially the private sector, is today increasingly diversified in its portfolio, moving away from its core industrial production and management. This industry has often branched-out into secondary and tertiary goods and services, such as union busting, policy recommendation, estimates and planning, sanctioned assassinations, mass surveillance programs, malware production and deployment, and so on. One common adage for the intelligence field is that "intelligence is as intelligence does."

However, the singular product which remains at the core of this industry is intelligence. Intelligence as information is to have some secret knowledge of something. To governments and the public sector, this information is knowledge of and/or belonging to the enemy, which will often gain an advantage in armed conflict. To the private sector, intelligence is usually knowledge of a competitor, and/or "trade secrets" belonging to that competitor – such as blueprints and patents. However, because governments are often liable if they get caught spying on their own citizens, they will often hire-out private intelligence agencies to perform that same intelligence.

Unlike coffee, which is the core product of the coffee industry, or sugar, which is the core product of the sugar industry – intelligence is not a manufactured product, but it is nevertheless collected and cultivated in some manner.

Intelligence work can be conducted by government intelligence agencies, police forces, and military intelligence units. This work can also be engaged by private organizations, including; private intelligence agencies, multinational corporations, private investigators, drug cartels, narcotic cartels, terrorist groups, and others.

=== Intelligence collection (also known as espionage) ===
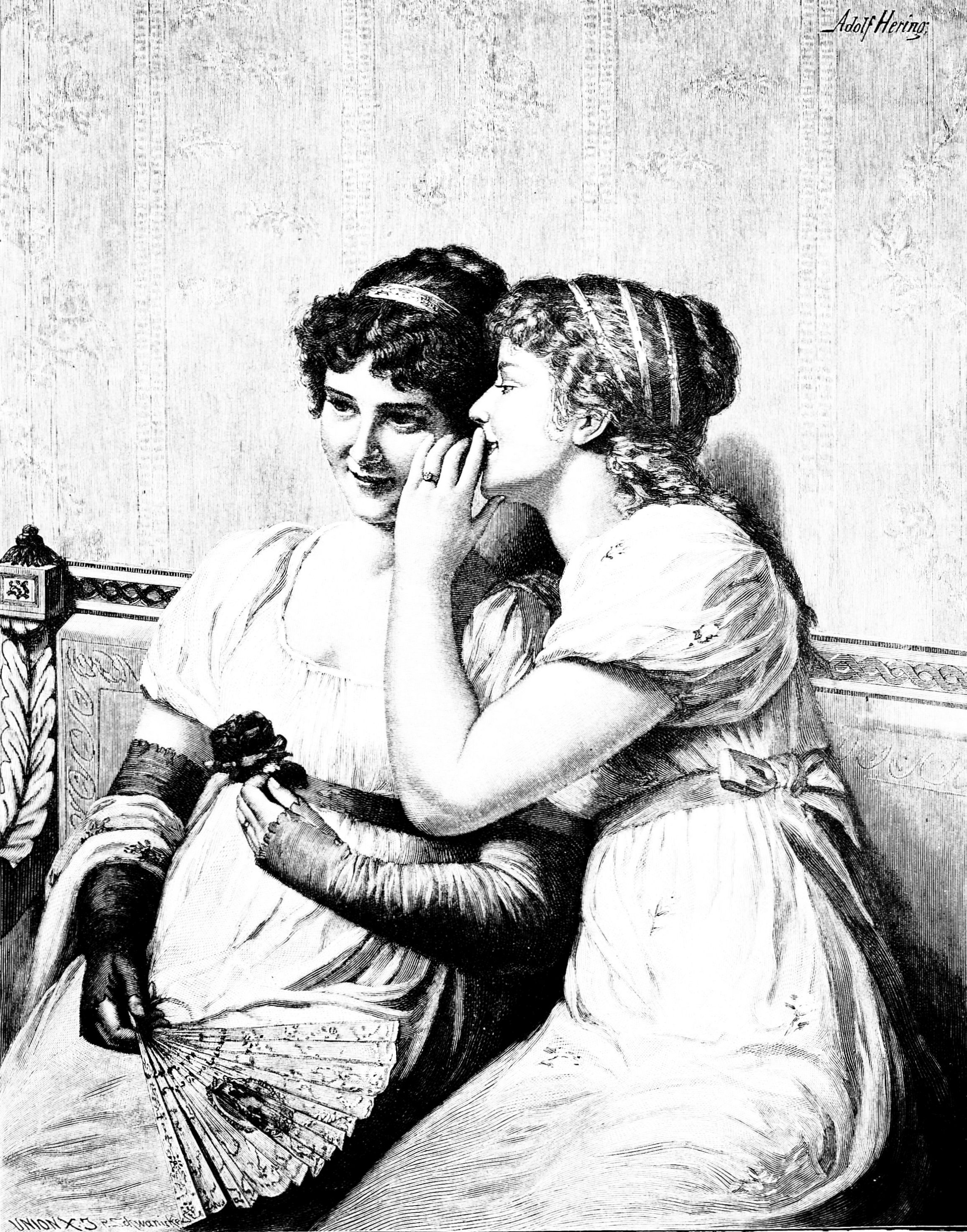
Similar to how farmers might "collect," wheat or oranges through the practice known as farming – the traditional collectors of the intelligence field are called spies, and they practice the craft of espionage, also known as intelligence gathering. This craft is declining in numbers with newer technologies.

The traditional manner in which intelligence has been cultivated, gathered, or collected throughout history, is by using contractual agents known as "spies." It is the job of a spy to gather this information, and their career field is known as espionage. For governments, spying occurs during both wartime and peacetime, so to say that intelligence is knowledge of the enemy is an incomplete definition, because intelligence collection also occurs against allies. Spies are often single and mission-specific solitary contracting agents who are commonly known as "secret agents."

Espionage, as an occupation, is older than the intelligence field by thousands of years. Espionage is so old that it is often jokingly called "the world's second oldest profession." However, and especially with the advancement of modern technologies – the collection of information has grown far beyond the capabilities of the traditional spy.

=== Surveillance and mass surveillance ===
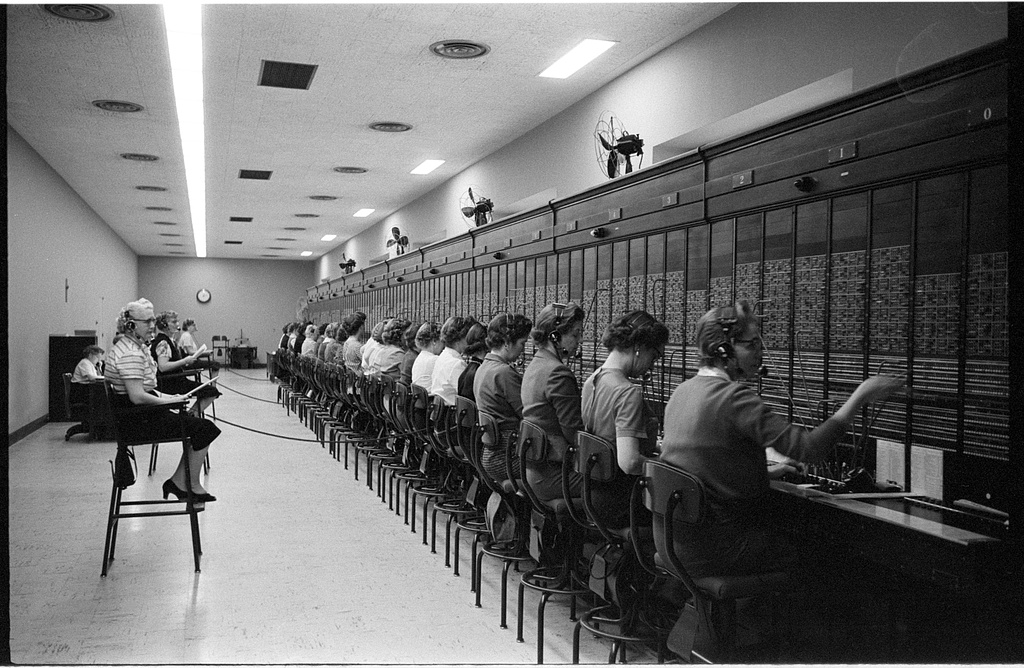
The advent of new technologies – such as this telephone switchboard – allowed for the creation of a new form of intelligence collection through surveillance.

Surveillance is often considered as either a tool or a method, and it is one of the newer and non-traditional forms of intelligence collection, which has grown with the advent of modern technologies, such as the printing press and postal systems. The first mass surveillance systems ever created were those post offices in response to the proliferation of written correspondences after the former barriers to communication were lowered. While governments and companies provided the service of carrying the post and dispatches, they also engaged in postal censorship. In fact, the oldest law enforcement agency in the world was the Post Office Investigation Branch – until the British Royal Mail was privatized in 1996, splintering from Post Office Limited.

After centuries, newer communications technologies were invented using radio frequencies, especially the telegraph and the telephone. One such radio device was called a bug. The Thing was a famous bug deployed by the NKGB shortly after the end of World War II. It was a gift of the Soviet Union to US Ambassador W. Averell Harriman, and hung on the walls of the Embassy of the United States in London from 1945 to 1951.

Today, mass surveillance is carried out over the internet. Computer programs, softwares, and malware – like keyloggers and spyware – are deployed by any interested party in collecting massive pattern of life profiles through the monitoring of digital footprints. Revelations discovered after the Snowden disclosures by the former US government contract employee revealed that the National Security Agency (NSA) had already deployed malware against American citizens without their knowledge or consent.

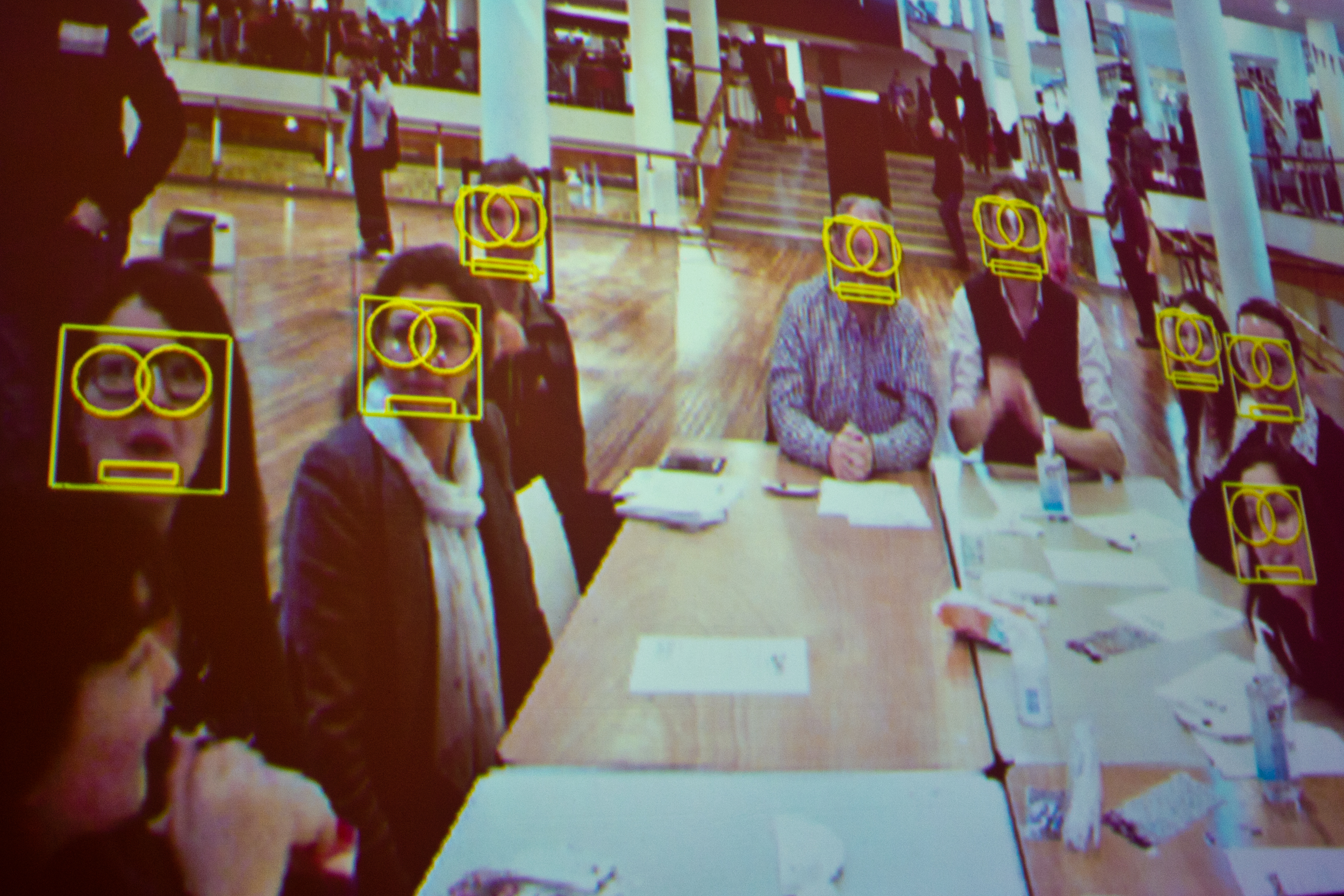
Facial recognition systems are being increasingly deployed by intelligence agencies to track the movements of humans across the planet.

Surveillance has also become the progenitor of over one billion surveillance cameras scattered around the world, which are video cameras designed for the purposes of monitoring human movements. Mostly, these cameras are used by police departments or security services, but they are also often incorporated into the capabilities of the intelligence field. Greater London was once known as the surveillance capitol of the world, and there remains a surveillance camera on nearly every street corner there. Over 50% of all the world's surveillance cameras are in China.

Today, video camera surveillance uses facial recognition systems and gait analysis to identify "suspected" individuals. In London, for example, the Metropolitan Police officers working at video monitors use facial recognition to match a list of suspects – as many as 6,000 or more within the city alone – to those "matches" identified by the system. The surveillance network of the United Kingdom is overseen by the Biometrics and Surveillance Camera Commissioner.

=== Open-source intelligence collection and management ===
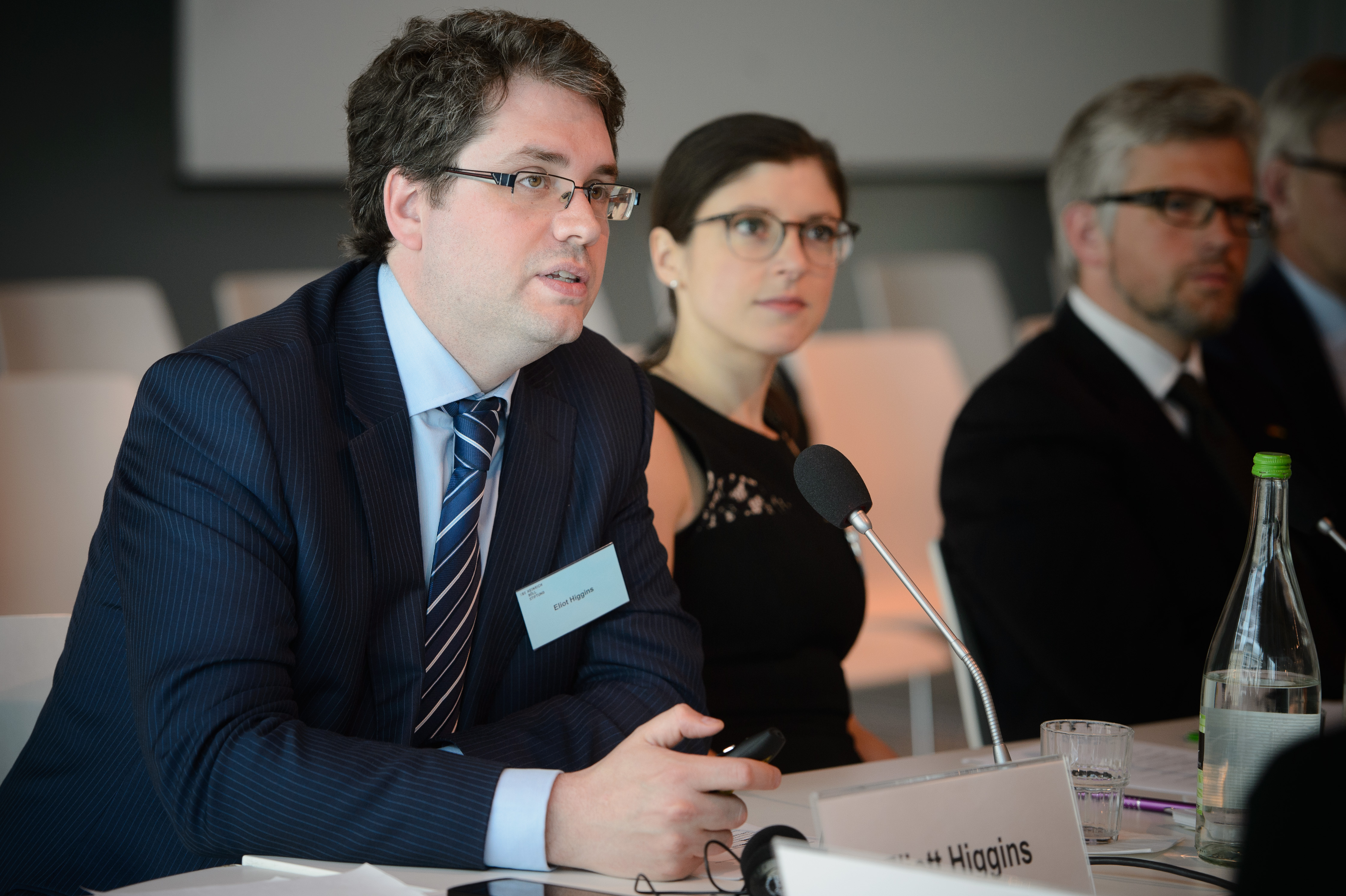
Eliot Higgins created the OSINT-specific intelligence agency known as Bellingcat, and is largely credited for transforming the OSINT space into a viable career path alternative.

Open-source intelligence (often abbreviated as OSINT) is the information that has been collected through means that are publicly available to anyone and collating that information into consumable intelligence products. OSINT collection is considered to be one of the more traditional crafts within intelligence, dating back to at least the 16th century and the Council of Ten.

Through much of history, after the creation of publicly available information to be found in newspapers, journals, and news magazines – the job of an OSINT officer was to sit for hours every day reading those relevant publications. OSINT still maintains that core principle, but has also become inundated with the rapid and constant flow of modern information on the internet with ever-shrinking news cycles.

OSINT has become so integrated into intelligence collection that some scholars of intelligence studies write that it is "the lifeblood of intelligence." In order to sift through the massive amounts of raw data nearly overwhelming the basic wage government employees of intelligence agencies, the Central Intelligence Agency created In-Q-Tel to raise the capital for private intelligence agencies that would manage OSINT for them.

Wikipedia is often a source for open-source intelligence collection – even though most analysts regard it as unreliable.

After the 2010s, the definition of OSINT collection often incorporates the website Wikipedia somewhere in that definition, or conversation – because this website itself is built as an open source information platform. Wikipedia is now often considered a first-base for OSINT collectors, and veteran analysts will train their newer recruits to use this website. While the information here is sometimes wrong, leaders train that it is important for an OSINT collector to know where a Wikipedian got their information, because the information landscape here represents knowledge in the popular zeitgeist.

OSINT collection is merely the practice of observing the information provided by a source, but it is no longer considered OSINT collection when those collectors decide to contribute information to Wikipedia – that is when it becomes information warfare. In 2007, for example, one incident that violated the Wikipedia terms of service occurred when users at IP addresses registered to computers owned by the Federal Bureau of Investigation (FBI) and the CIA were discovered having edited several pages, violating the conflict of interest.

Another concern for the industry is that enemies and "bad actors" might use open sources to send hidden communications. For example, since anyone is allowed to edit Wikipedia, something that might appear as random editing or vandalism might actually be a coded message to sleeper agents, stay-behind networks, or other spies deployed in the field. This is called steganography – one famous example was the secret code broadcast over the radio in Rwanda which signaled to the militia that the Rwandan genocide had begun, and that they needed to begin fighting: "It's time to cut down the tall trees."

=== Collection management ===
There are two types of intelligence officers that typically "manage" spies in the field. One is called a Case officer, who is assigned to "handle" agents. The other works in the field of collection management, and is usually some form of subject matter expert who is entrusted to verify the veracity of claims. In the United States, these officers might be called Reports Officers (ROs) or Collection Management Officers (CMOs). In other countries, these people might be called Collection Managers or Collection Strategists.

=== Counterintelligence ===
In order to counteract any enemy activities, counterintelligence (CI) exists to ensure that the information has not been contaminated in some way by moles or rats. Counterintelligence officers, as they are called, are not assigned to collect intelligence about the enemy, but about the enemy's ability to collect intelligence. The primary subfield of CI is known as counterespionage (CE), and it is the job of CE to hunt, find, and catch other spies.

== Industrial production, from produce to product ==
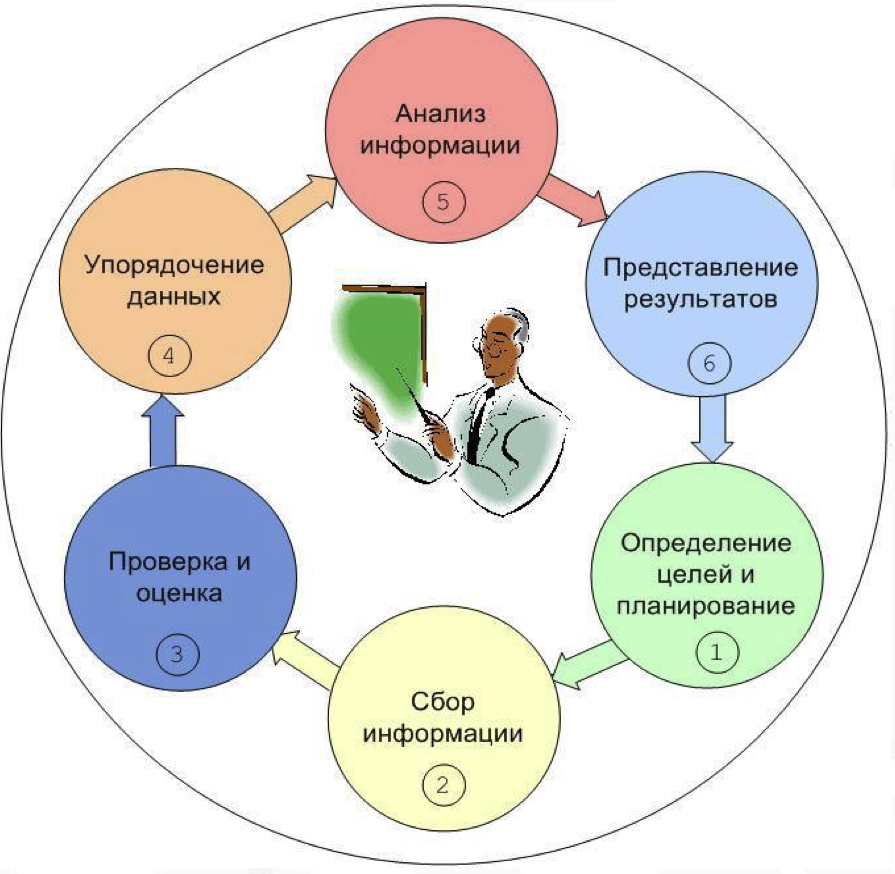
The Intelligence Cycle, while it was invented by the United States Army in 1948, has been adopted and glocalized throughout the world, largely as a result of the Officer in Residence program. Most organizations have today adapted it to suit their cultures. Here, the cycle appears in the Russian language.

=== Theories of management ===
There are several working theories as to how intelligence management should work, and how the intelligence field should be structured around that process. During the French Revolution, certain approaches to professionalizing the approach to working with the products produced by espionage were invented, laying many of the foundations to the modern intelligence management approach. Many years later, during World War I, further advancements were made on both sides of the war.

In 1948, the intelligence cycle was theorized in the United States by Phillip Davidson and Robert R. Glass while they were serving as staffers at the United States Army Command and General Staff College. The theory first spread throughout the United States Intelligence Community, where it was then absorbed by most of the intelligence field. Today, the intelligence cycle, and its accompanying theory of intelligence cycle management, is the predominate working theory in nearly every modern intelligence agency. The intelligence cycle is not, however, a law of human nature that must be followed everywhere, it is only a theoretical model of how some scholars and practitioners think that the industry should operate. In those countries that follow the cycle model, you will find their intelligence communities structured around it. Elsewhere, intelligence communities might appear different, and with different priorities.

Many scholars of intelligence studies have identified faults in the standard theory of the intelligence cycle, and have created alternatives. Art Hulnick created the Matrix Model, for example. The Target-Centric Approach To Intelligence is another breakaway from the intelligence cycle invented by Robert M. Clark.

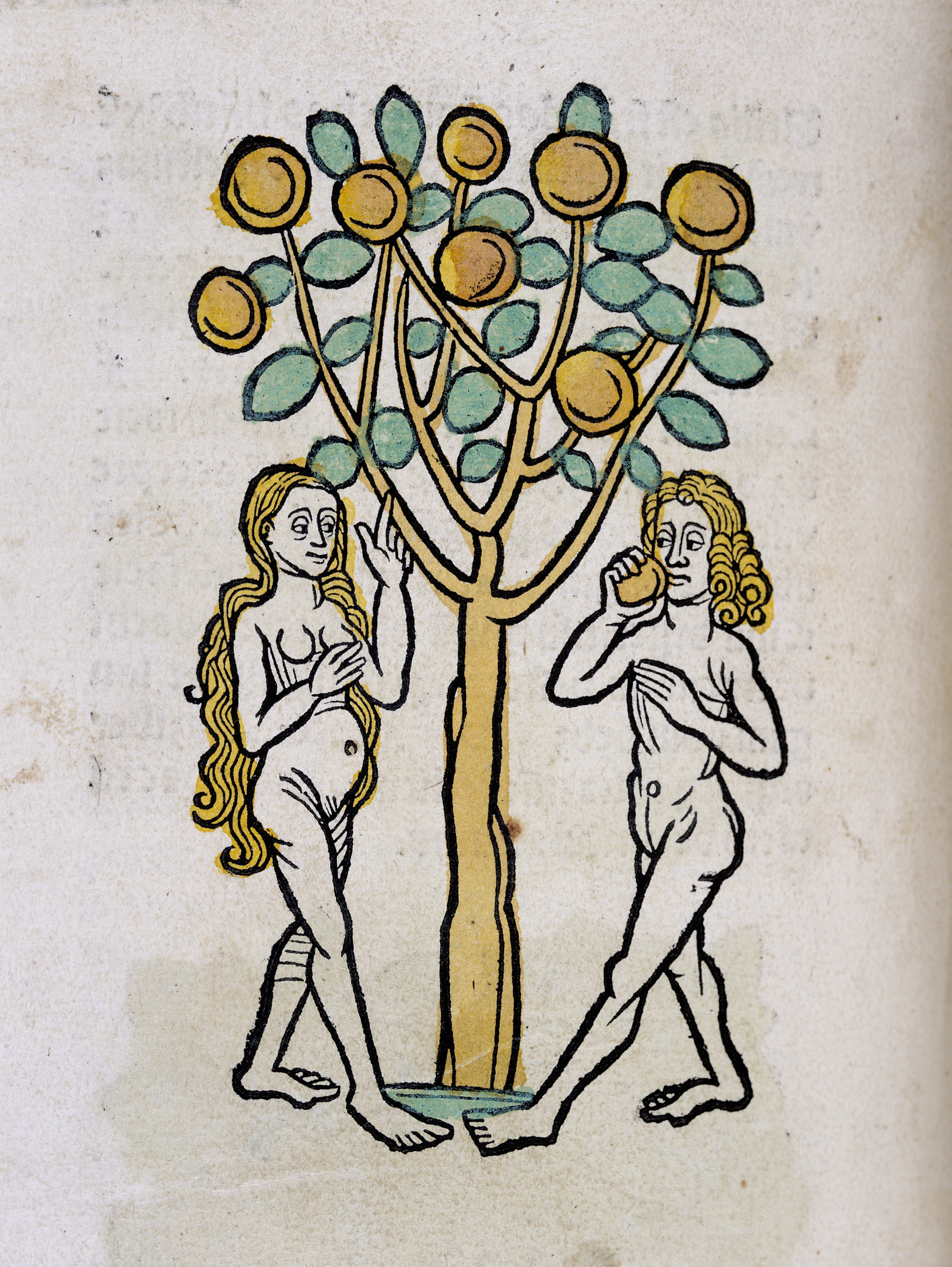
Specifically in the English language, many intelligence-related terms are metaphors derived from stories in The Bible, and especially interpretations of the Tree of Knowledge. This is why so many of the terms used in traditional espionage sound like they belong on an apple orchard: cultivating, gathering, processing, and so on.

=== Processing raw intelligence ===
Similar to how raw hops collected from the field must be processed and distilled to create beer, and how many other crops must be processed into products prior to consumption – when raw intelligence is collected from the field, or gathered by other methods, it must also be properly processed. This is literally called intelligence processing, and it is the intermediary step in between collection and analysis. Often, case officers and collection managers do a decent enough job at processing that they are able to pass on field reports directly to analysts. But in the modern era, digital technologies also scoop-up thousands of bits of secret information every second; telephone intercepts, text messages, satellite photographs, emails, laser mic surveillance transcripts, are all in need of processing by intelligence managers.

When Michael Hayden, then the Director of the National Security Agency, was asked what his major problems were shortly after the September 11 attacks, the pithy aphorism that he gave in response was: "I have three: processing, processing, and processing."

Raw intelligence is pure and unfiltered, meaning that it might be written in another language that needs to be translated into the working language of that intelligence community, or it might need to be deciphered if it is something written in code. Intelligence comes in to headquarters or field bases from every method of collection and gathering, and sometimes even from all-source intelligence.

Much of these processing responsibilities have in recent decades been taken out of public sector intelligence agencies and hired-out to contractors in Big Tech.

=== Analyzing that intelligence ===
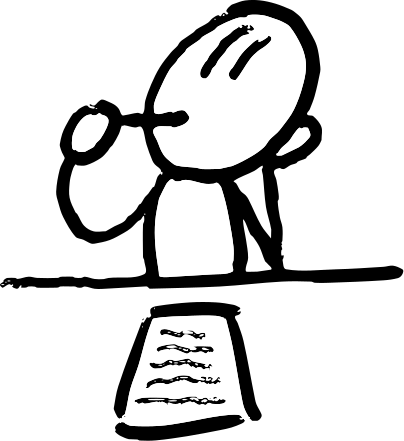
Intelligence analysts are the deep thinkers of the intelligence field. Their job is to sit, read, and think about what it all means, before producing consumable intelligence products.

After raw intelligence is adequately processed, it is passed to intelligence analysts. Analysts make up the bulk of intelligence work throughout the world. Analysis is effectively the thinking stage of the intelligence process, where creativity is often considered a paramount trait for an effective analyst, alongside quick thinking and wisdom. The industry prefers to hire those people called "the best brains possible" as intelligence analysts.

While traditional spies are often hired straight out of the Marines or the infantry, and are not necessarily depended upon for their book smarts, but for their street smarts. Intelligence analysts must be smart, they are almost always required to be college graduates and deep thinkers.

However, as the world of intelligence tends to shift focus from one primary fascination, such as from the "evil virus of Satan" that was either Capitalism or Communism during the Cold War, to the illusive threat of terrorism with the rise of groups like Al-Qaeda – it takes time to train analysts on new topics, new geographies and demographies, and new cultures. Especially within government intelligence work, analysts serve at the pleasure of their bosses, and are often given work that lies outside of their expertise because new situations develop. It is preferable for intelligence communities to also hire recent graduates with language proficiencies in the region or area where they might be operating.

While in the corporate sector, analysts might be valued more for their opinions than merely their assessments – most government analysts are expected to be dispassionate in their work. It is impossible for humans not to feel emotion, but the objective of public sector intelligence analysis is to avoid what is called political spin. When analysts succumb to the pressures of politicians, the resulting products are called "intelligence to please," which is generally frowned upon by the rest of the intelligence field. Government intelligence does not exist to tell politicians what they want to hear, it exists to tell them the truth about their enemies.

If analysts do not work quickly enough, their work might receive something called an OBE, which means that the intelligence was "overtaken by events."

== Clientele and target market ==
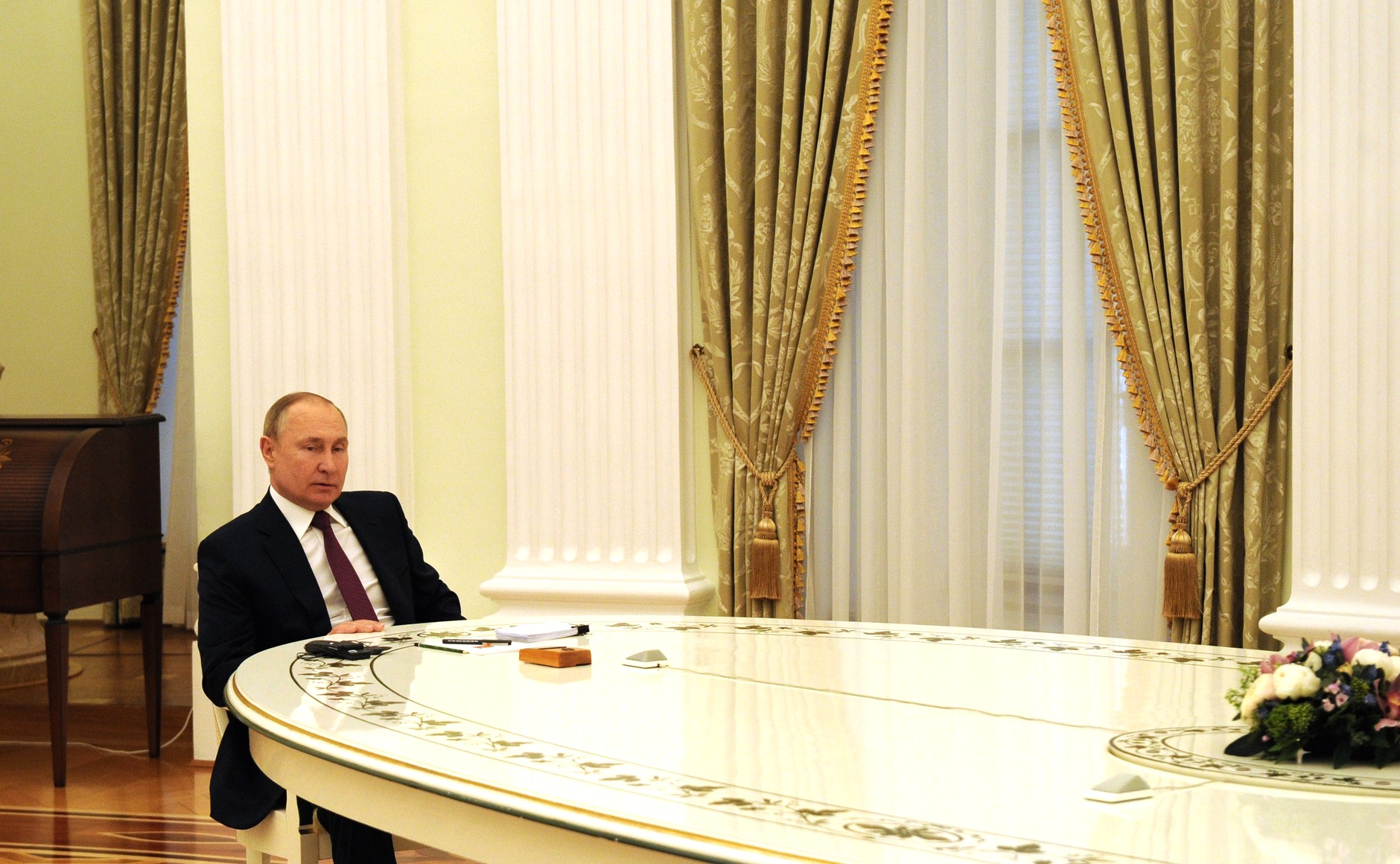
Vladimir Putin, a former Case officer for the KGB, and the longest-serving leader of Russia since Stalin, has developed a streamlined and personalized intelligence consumption schedule.

The relationship between the intelligence field and their clients changes depending on whether the work is in the public sector or the private sector, because the CEOs of companies and the politicians of governments usually want different things, and expect different outcomes.

Those persons at intelligence organizations who are assigned to interact or face with their clientele are called briefers, and their specific responsibility is to present intelligence briefings (which is similar, but different to a debriefing). Most intelligence analysts are not usually assigned to provide briefings. Intelligence briefings are usually in some form of presentation, in addition to some form of written intelligence product called finished intelligence.

=== Policymakers ===
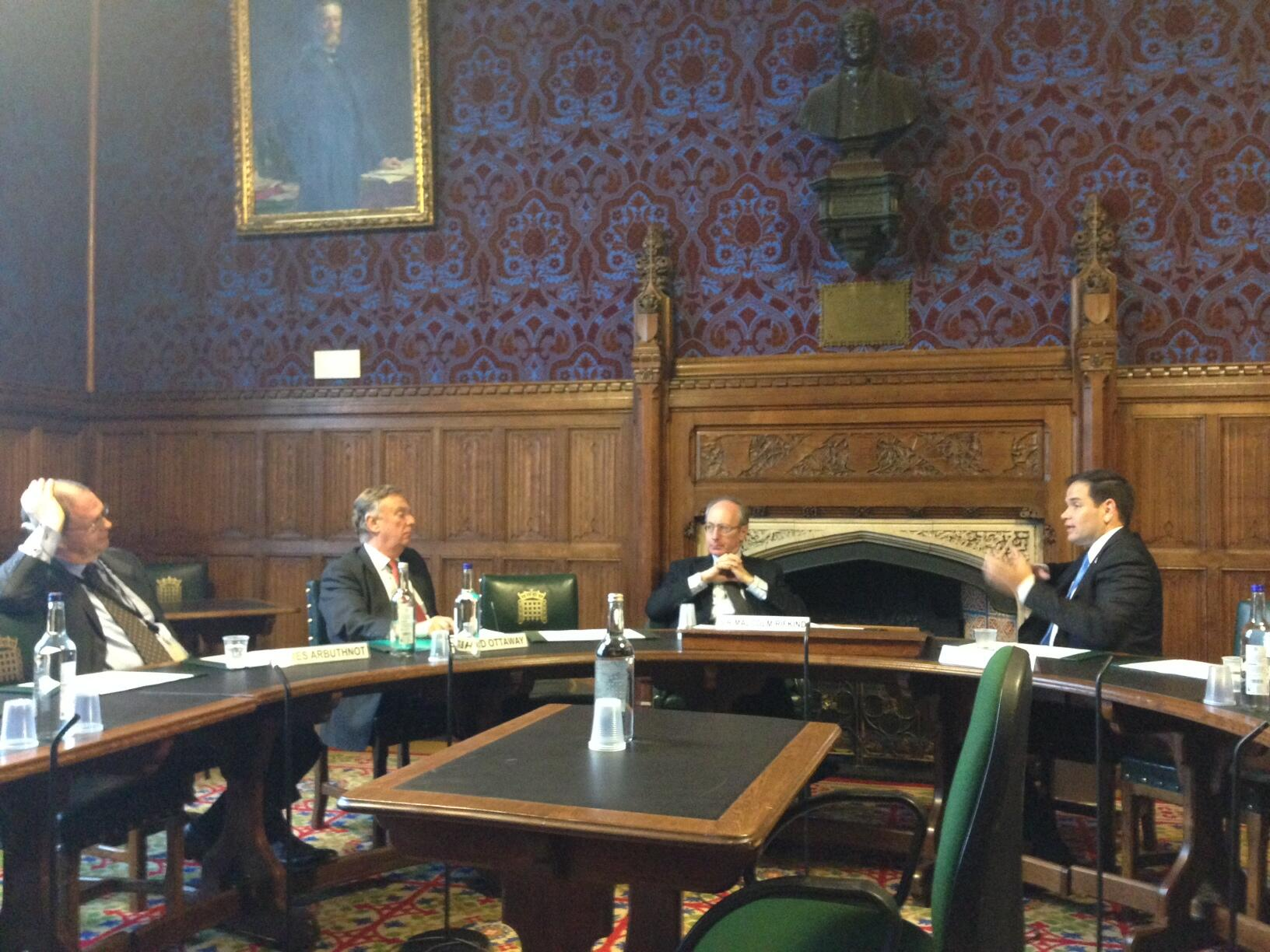
The Intelligence and Security Committee of Parliament, while assigned oversight for British intelligence, also consume intelligence products.

For government agencies, the primary client and consumer of intelligence products are the politicians somewhere at the top of that governmental structure – every government is different, but usually, the decision makers are often elected officials or members of the monarchy. Intelligence products exist to support that policymaking and decision-making. These decisions primarily revolve around matters related to national security, military affairs, law enforcement, and international relations.

==== United States President's Daily Brief ====
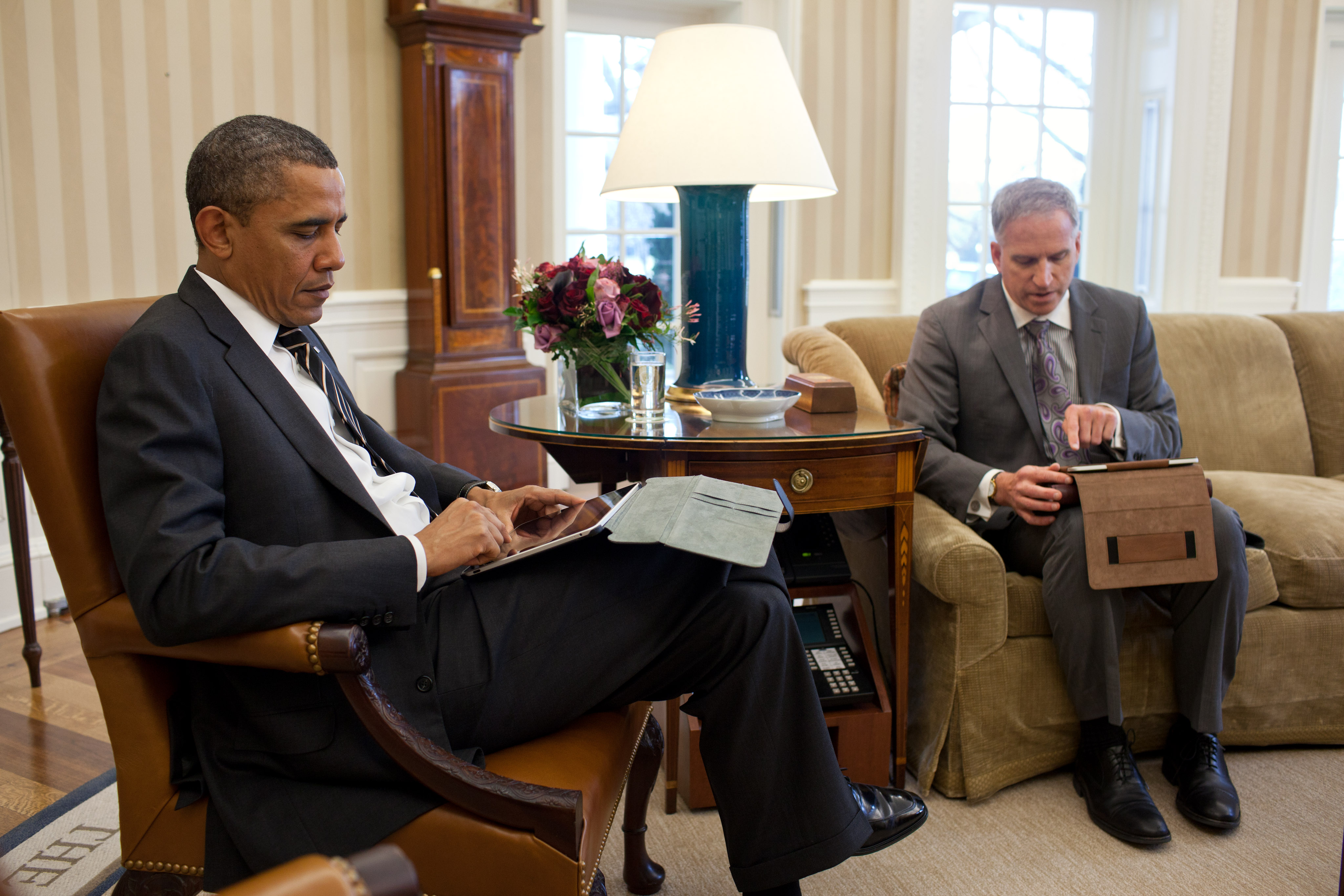
President Barack Obama is seen here receiving the President's Daily Brief from Robert Cardillo.

The most well-known intelligence briefing in the history of the intelligence field is the United States President's Daily Brief (PDB), of which intelligence analysts have been assigned as briefers to the President of the United States over the years, to present the daily product of the largest intelligence community in the world. The PDB has existed for over half-a-century, and every US President has had different methods of consuming the intelligence. Some Presidents have preferred to arrange full briefing sessions with several people in the room and a question-and-answer session, while other Presidents have preferred to consume the PDB as a written product silently by the fireplace.

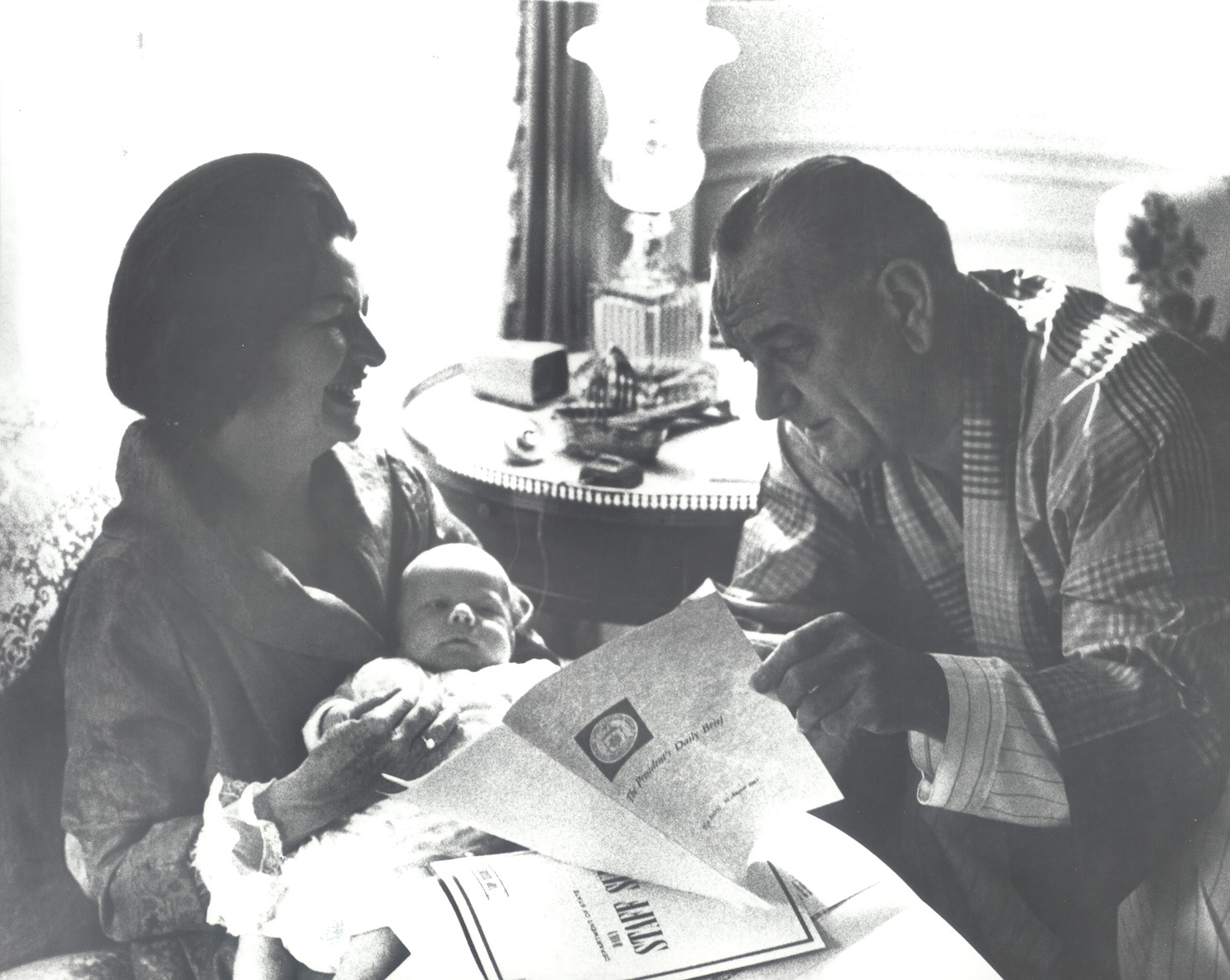
President Lyndon B. Johnson and First Lady Lady Bird Johnson read the President's Daily Brief aloud to their grandchild, Patrick Lyndon Nugent, for story time.

During his first term, Donald Trump notoriously refused to partake in many of the PDB's that had been tasked specifically for him, preferring to pass on this responsibility and give it to people more qualified, often because he could not understand the concepts that had already been simplified for him. Many people assumed that Trump could not read well enough to consume the written products, and on the rare occasions that he attended, he preferred to receive his briefings orally. He did look at the pictures. When he did attend, he would sometimes receive verifiable information that he dismissed immediately, preferring to believe foreign leaders over his own CIA staff, especially concerning an incident where Trump was informed that Russia had ordered bounties on US servicemembers stationed in Afghanistan. During his second term, he has nearly scrapped the PDB altogether.

The Chinese and the Russians have similar variations on the theme of the PDB, received at Zhongnanhai and the Kremlin.

=== Military leadership ===
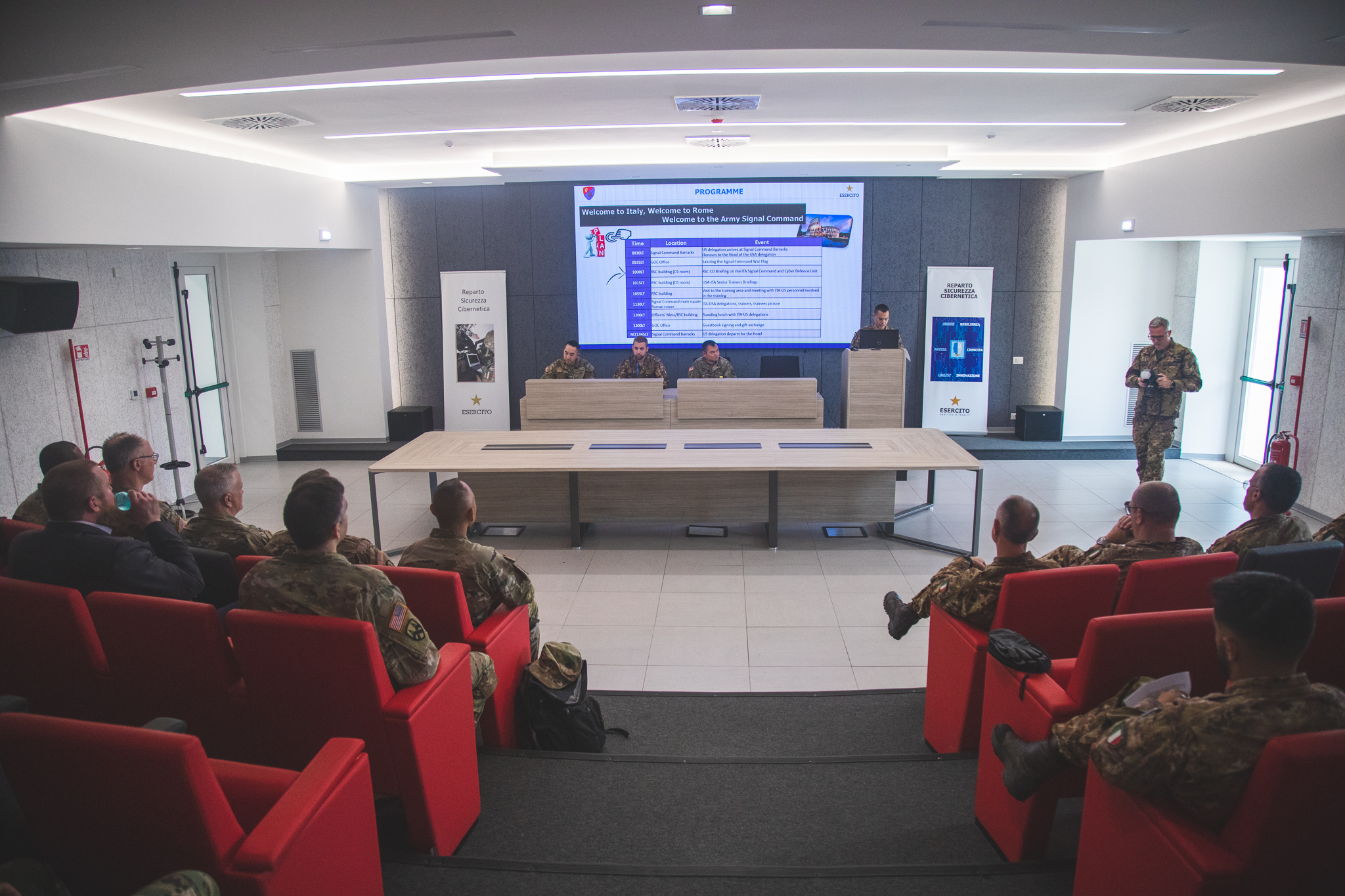
Militaries rely on the active voice and quick presentation styles for their intelligence briefings, which are not dissimilar to the style of any other branch except in content.

In militaries, and especially in the world of military intelligence (MI), the consumers of large intelligence products are usually the Generals and Admirals in charge of the order of battle or some form of military echelon. However, military intelligence is incorporated into every level of command, and clients are not limited to the highest ranks – even Butterbars and Landlubbers barely out of officer training school consume intelligence products when they are assigned to their units.

=== C-suite executives ===
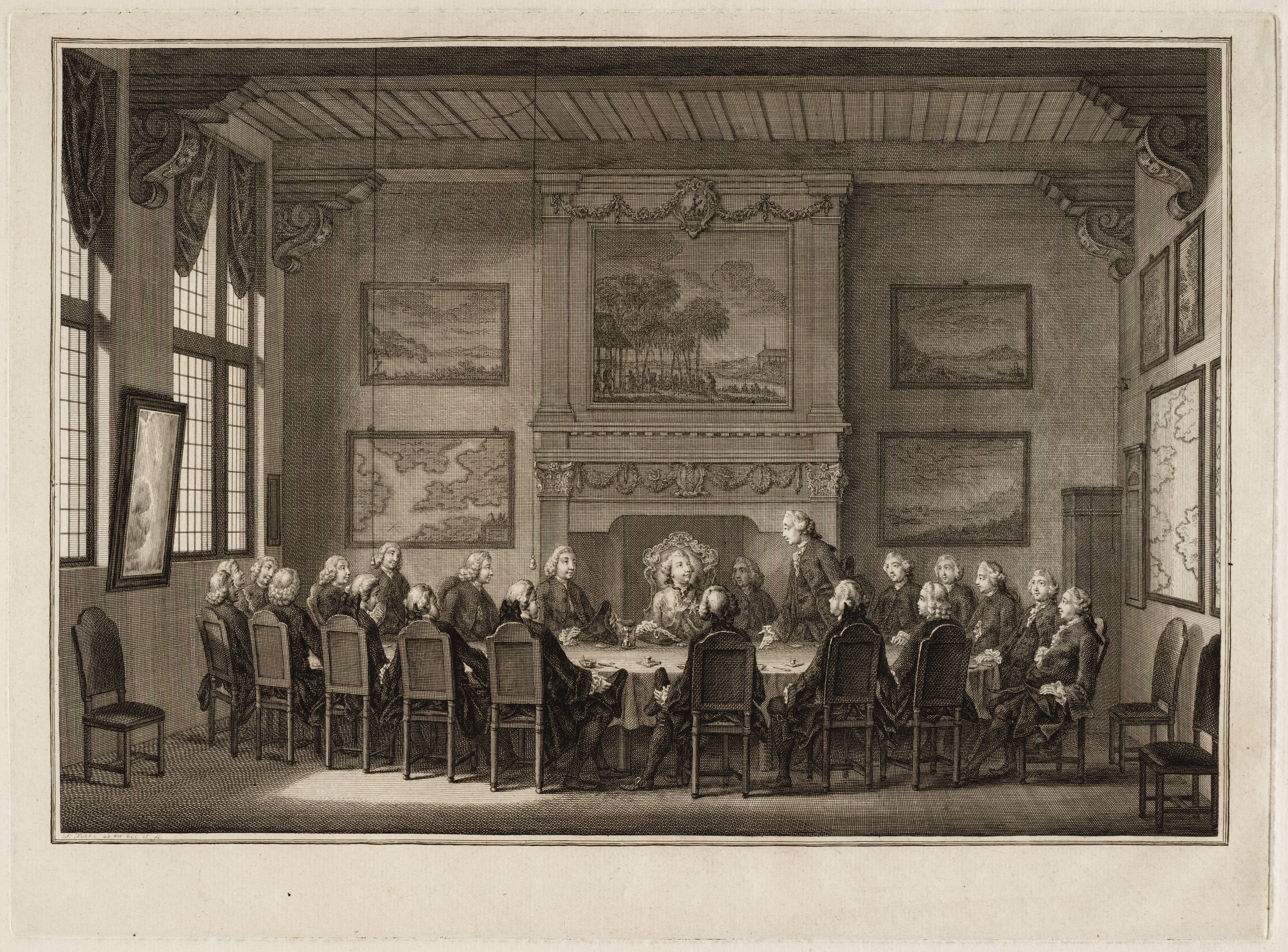
The Gentlemen Seventeen in the Directors' Room at the East India House, Amsterdam. The Dutch East India Company relied heavily on military intelligence to make corporate decisions.

In the corporate world, intelligence products are used for an even broader set of decisions than in the realm of governments and politicians. The primary client here is usually the C-Suite business executive, or perhaps the Board of directors of a large company. As opposed to the primary objective of public sector intelligence, which is mostly to gain an advantage over a perceived enemy, the objective the private sector is to serve the executive's agenda. Private intelligence often fails when executives do not understand the purpose of intelligence, and expect their intelligence analysts to perform predictive judgements, which are often outside of their core function.

Despite the fact that there are large private intelligence agencies that specialize in performing intelligence operations, most multinational corporations maintain some staff of corporate intelligence, sometimes a staff of only a few analysts. The Coca-Cola Company, for example, maintains their Global Intelligence Division (GID), as of 2026 led by Matthew Howe. However, Coca Cola also hires private intelligence agencies such as Stratfor to provide intelligence on potential oppositional forces, such as in 2007, when they hired Stratfor to investigate members of PETA in Canada.

=== Police departments ===
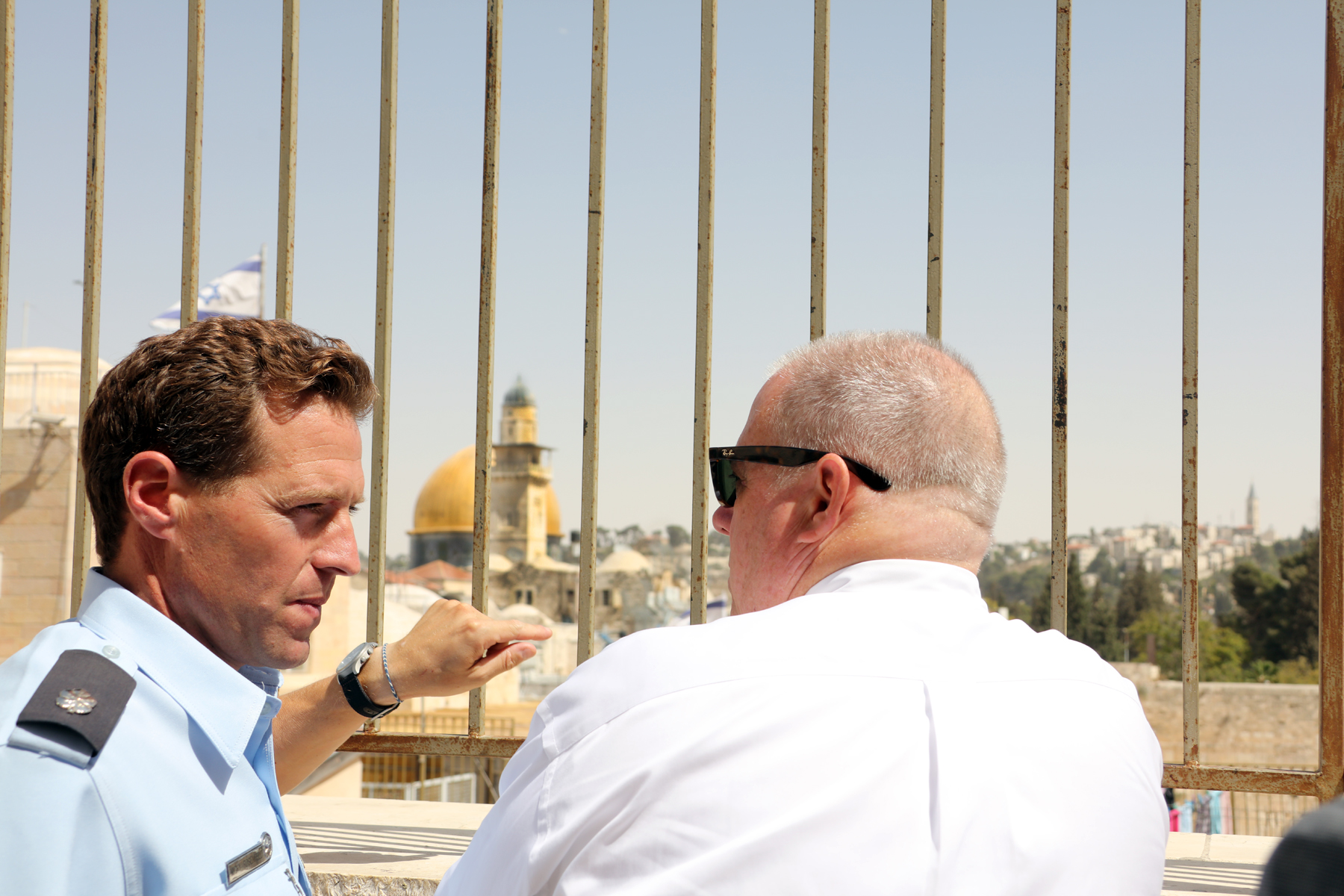
The Governor of Maryland, Larry Hogan, is seen here receiving intelligence from Israeli police during a trip there.

In what has often been called mission creep, the leading criminal intelligence bureaus and departments in cities around the world often change their core mission set depending on what Art Hulnick called the threat du jour. Threat du jour, in this respect, follows that when the perceived threat against society was Communism, criminal intelligence units focused on suppressing Communist organizations. Similarly, when the USSR was created and the Okhrana was dissolved, Russian criminal intelligence focused on suppressing what they called the Capitalist disease there. When that threat became organized crime, these units shifted to largely become gang units, and when narcotics became the threat du jour, those gang units became anti-narcotics task forces.

Today, criminal intelligence organizations have largely been absorbed into counterterrorism bureaus, with terrorism becoming the new threat du jour. The same work might be performed, but around the world, more money and effort has been allocated to counterterrorism over standard intelligence collection since the start of the Global War On Terror. Specifically in the United States, however, that relationship goes back much further, to the 1980s, when William Colby created the Counterterrorism Task Force. London's former Special Branch, for example, which was the single-largest municipal criminal intelligence branch in the world, was absorbed into the Counter Terrorism Command in 2006. Los Angeles's Counter-Terrorism and Criminal Intelligence Bureau was merged in 2010 with the former Special Operations Bureau to create the Counter-Terrorism and Special Operations Bureau. Chicago's Bureau of Organized Crime (which was designed to hunt gangsters like Al Capone), is now the Bureau of Counter Terrorism.

== History ==
Despite the fact that espionage is thousands of years old, the intelligence field as it is known today is roughly 100–200 years old. The original definition of intelligence (in English) was as to be synonymous with journalism and news, and has morphed and transformed into whatever uses it has today. Hence the name of many newspapers today still called The Intelligencer. At least by the 1600s in the English language, intelligence officers were categorized into several categories, to include spies, scouts, and intelligencers.

== See also ==
- Security sector governance and reform
