= Intelligence (information) =

Information as knowledge of the enemy

Intelligence, or intel, can be information or knowledge about anyone or anything considered contrary to the modus operandi of an organizational entity, such as a government or a business. Information is unprocessed knowledge, and they are both forms of intelligence, but at different levels of maturation and actionability. Usually, policymakers and executives prefer knowledge over information, which is why the information must be processed by members of the intelligence field.

For governments and militaries, intelligence is especially considered knowledge of an enemy combatant in war, and the overall environment in which they operate. For the corporate world, intelligence might be knowledge of a competitor or the members of trade union. It often provides leaders with answers to the Five Ws; who, what, when, where, and why. Intelligence is not a singular type of product, it can be found in many different states of existence and formats. When it is unprocessed as raw information and data, it is called raw intelligence, and when it is a fully-developed product of information, it is called finished intelligence.

The collection of people and organizations around the world that work with intelligence is called the intelligence field, where intelligence is cultivated, gathered, processed, analyzed, and distributed. Because intelligence as information is so closely linked to the intelligence field, many scholars argue that intelligence is both a thing and the process of how that thing evolves. However, the process is more commonly referred to as intelligence management – of which the most popular working theory today is known as the intelligence cycle, which is in essence a corollary to the life cycle of intelligence.

== Vectors of information ==
Before the invention of the written word, intelligence was conveyed through oral tradition.

Later, the most common form of intelligence product was made with disposable materials, such as paper and ink to create written products; scrolls, pamphlets, reports, diaries, books, and so on. Dr. Irving Finkel laments that the ancient cultures of India most likely wrote their information on materials that have largely degraded through time, leaving us only with their official seals and only fractions of a language.

In the Middle Ages, scrolls containing secret intelligence were stamped with wax seals to ensure the secrecy of that information. Letters, both before and after the invention of envelopes, were also sealed with wax for many years, and later with adhesives and glues.

Other paper products have also carried intelligence: maps, photographs, sketches.

Microdots, microfilm, and microfiche were later invented to carry large quantities of printed material in small space.

When computers became commonplace, the floppy disk, the CD-ROM and DVD-ROM, the SD card, the external hard disk, and the USB flash drive were ubiquitous carriers of intelligence.

In the modern technologic age, intelligence is often digital, existing as PDFs, Microsoft Word, and other software-specific products.

== Classification ==
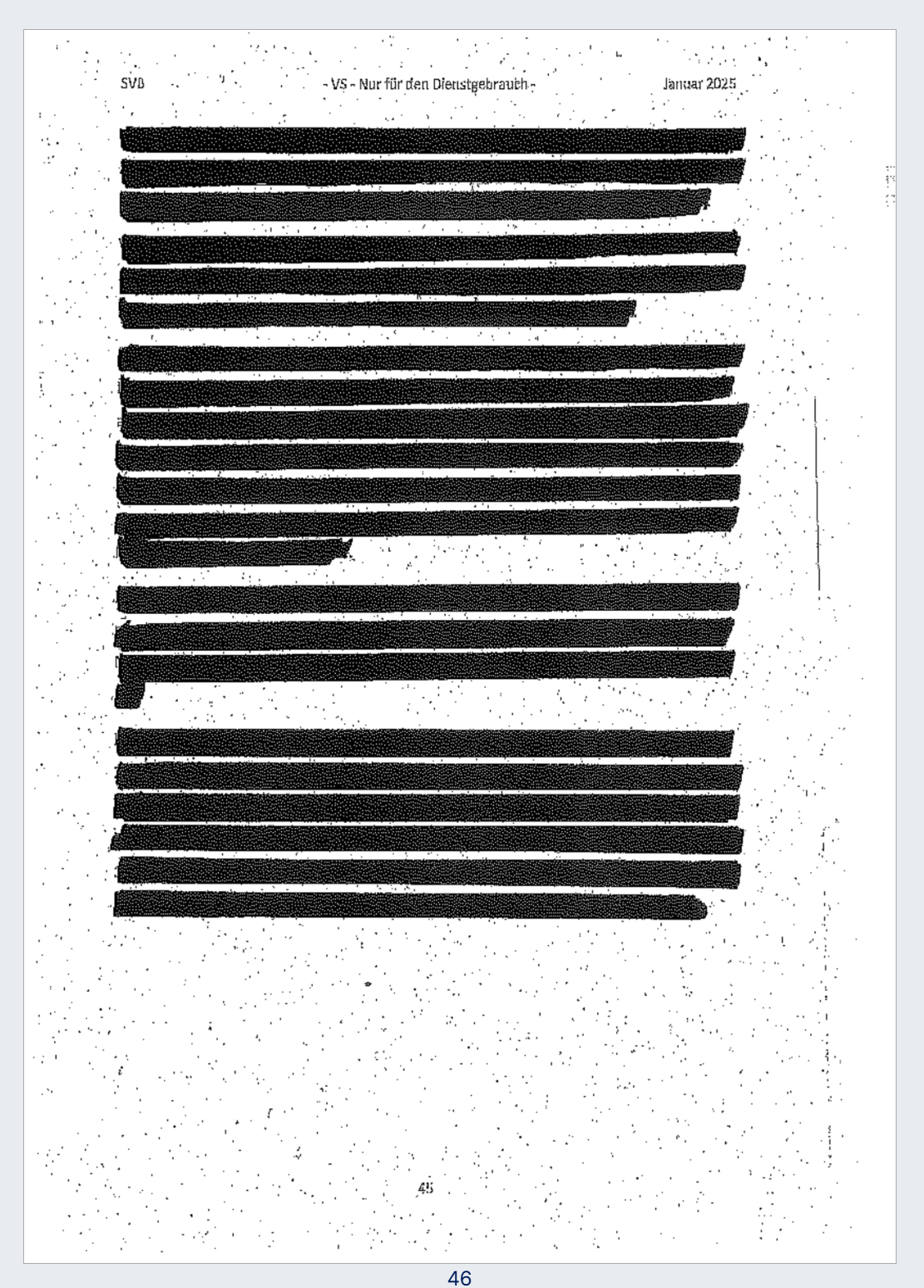
Much of the information known as intelligence is classified information

Generally, the differentiation between what is called intelligence today and all other information is that intelligence is usually placed into some sort of classification.

Even that information which has been obtained as open-source intelligence can often become classified by a government when it is all put together. Disparate pieces of information on their own might not be as dangerous as when they come together to form one understanding of reality.

== States of existence ==
Michael S. Warner writes that intelligence as information is incomplete (in the English language). He asks the reader to imagine a phone book, and then to ask yourself how many of the phone numbers in the phone book you are actually searching for. The phone book is compared to raw intelligence, which is the foundational form of intelligence, while the phone number of the person you are looking for is defined as "actionable" intelligence, or processed intelligence.

1. Raw intelligence is that intelligence that is merely data. Raw data that has not yet been processed.
2. Processed intelligence is that data that has become information ready to be analyzed.
3. Finished intelligence is that information which has been analyzed to become knowledge, and is ready to be disseminated.

== Levels of intelligence and actionability ==
Intelligence, as a product, is often measured by its "actionability," which determines which customers will be consuming it. The levels of intelligence are often described as those levels by which we measure intelligence actionability.

=== Strategic intelligence ===
Strategic intelligence, literally the intelligence designed for strategy, is that intelligence which is "forward thinking," and looks at predictable trends in the environment to monitor movements and buildups.

=== Tactical intelligence ===
Tactical Intelligence evaluates the situation at the tactical level.

=== Operational intelligence ===
Operational intelligence is that intelligence is used in real-time.

== Scopes of knowledge ==
=== Knowledge of who ===
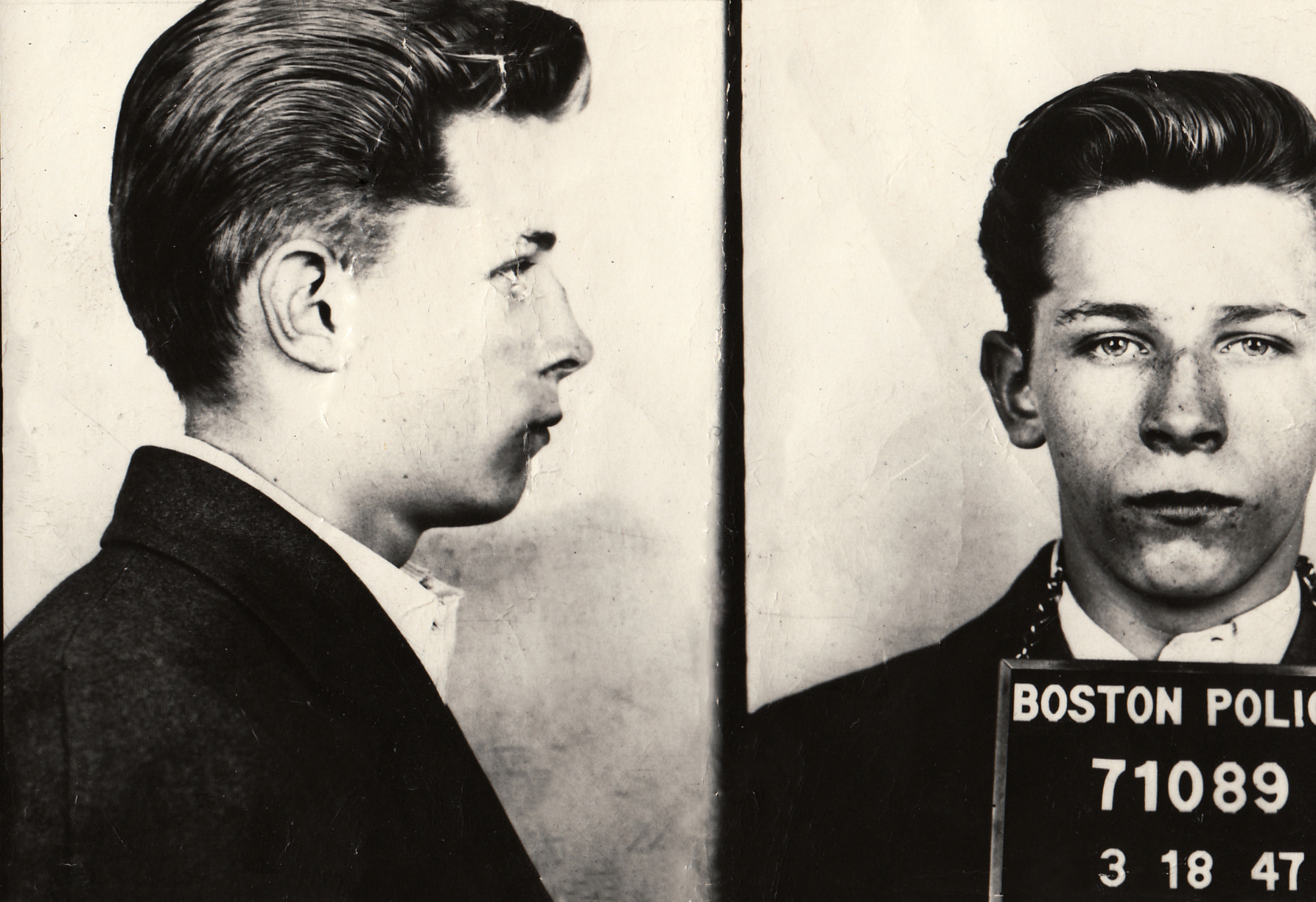
Mugshots are often used in compilations of intelligence profiles.

Knowing the character of a target is the first step in determining if they are an enemy, an ally, an oppositional force, merely a hinderance to an organization's modus operandi, or no threat at all. Knowing who someone is, and especially what they believe, is also beneficial to determining the severity of actions against them.

Despite some claims that intelligence is not collected on allies, intelligence is always collected on allies.

==== Pattern of life ====
Pattern-of-life analysis produces intelligence on how a person moves through the world, what they interact with, other people that might be in their social networks, and what actions they perform.

==== Profiles ====
Profiles are the more traditional full-spectrum of a person.

=== Knowledge of when ===
==== Foresight and prediction ====
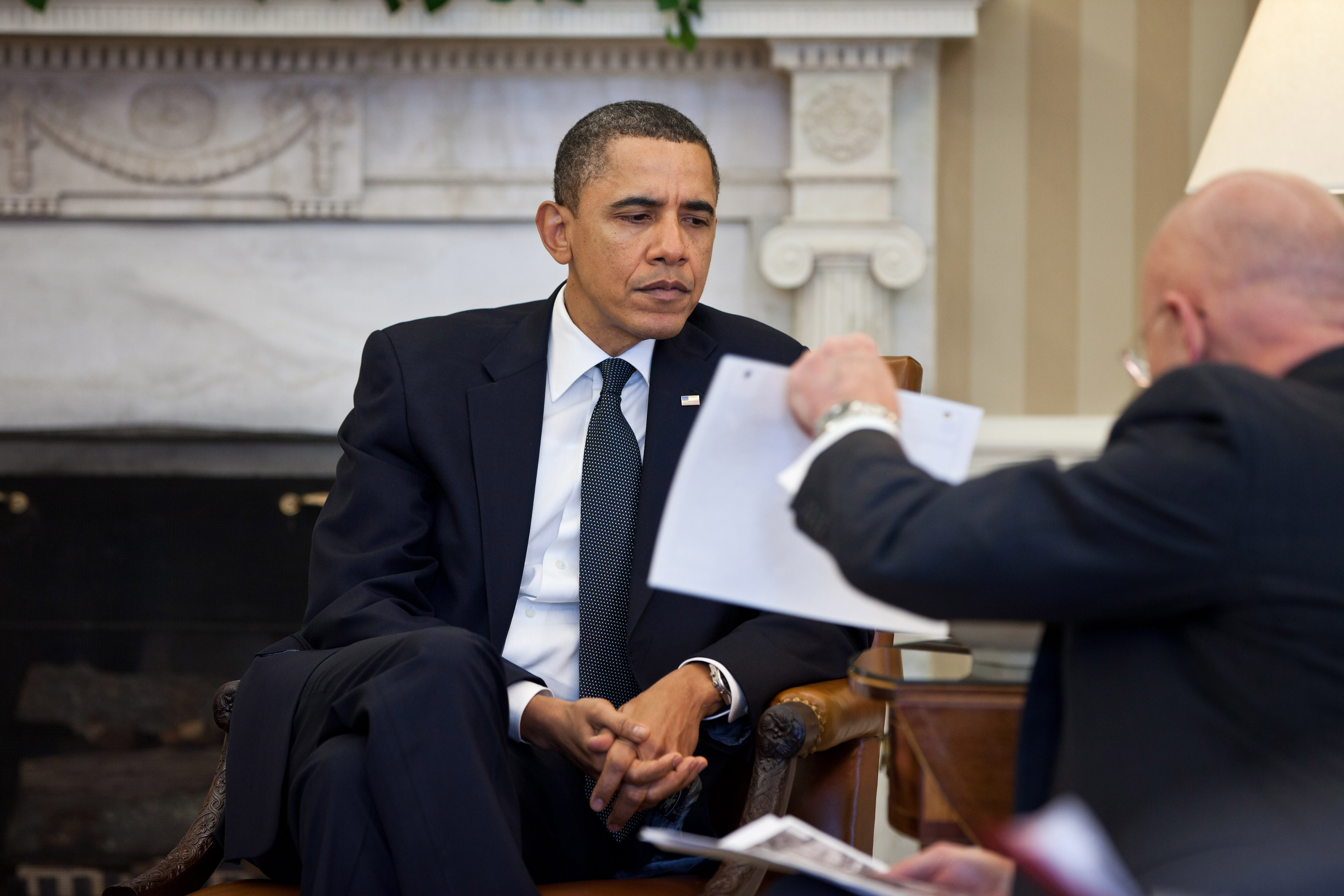
President Barack Obama, seen here receiving intelligence from James Clapper and the President's Daily Brief.

Prediction is not only limited to intelligence as information, but in general is one of the defining characteristics of intelligence itself. Brains automatically anticipate outcomes, often before the body moves itself. Extrapolating from that core theory of the automated systemic prediction of human action, knowing when something will happen on the macro scale is foundational to the intelligence field, and especially to the subfield of prevention. In the intelligence field, many types of events are determined to be "threats" that must be prevented from happening, including; terrorist attacks, ambushes, nuclear strikes, airstrikes, and explosions. Preventing attacks is of vital importance on the battlefield, and is one of the core functions of the military intelligence and counterterrorism.

Prediction, however, is not the same thing as prevention, which is not the same as preemptive action – but many politicians desire to confuse the two.

Since the rise of the intelligence field during World War II, two terms have arisen to become dominant in the knowledge of prediction in intelligence. The American version has long been known as an intelligence estimate, used by the distribution of National Intelligence Estimates. The British, meanwhile, prefer the term foresight intelligence assessments, while insight assessments are assessments of past actions. Assessments and estimates rank the future based on probabilities of future action, determining between certainty and unlikeliness. In Estimates and Assessments, the language used will often be in the form of words of estimative probability.

The field of preventive arts can take the form of risk management, crime prevention, and risk prevention. However, there is a worry that knowledge of the future might be conflated with estimates – both are equally important, but commanders are much more concerned about what an enemy "will do" rather than what they "can do." It is much more actionable to predict future enemy actions in the short-term, rather than the long-term.

In the corporate world, prevention does include all of those general disasters, and most private intelligence agencies refer to this knowledge as strategic intelligence. However, specifically to the corporate world there are a suite of threats to a business that do not exist for governments. Businesses might consider a threat to be a strike action, and will seek to prevent this from happening. Businesses might also seek to avoid being outbid during a hostile takeover, and seek to know when they need to act to prevent that from happening.

Predictive analytics is a more recent practice, as it uses the tools of modern computing. Much of the literature of predictive knowledge has become inundated with articles about the use of artificial intelligence, where the traditional knowledge of threat intelligence is becoming obsolete as employers seek to save money by replacing their employees with robots.

==== History and insight ====
Intelligence history, military history, and intelligence studies provide insights into the past to create models for the future. The British differentiate here that foresight looks into the future while insight looks into the recent past, but they use assessments for both.

=== Knowledge of where ===
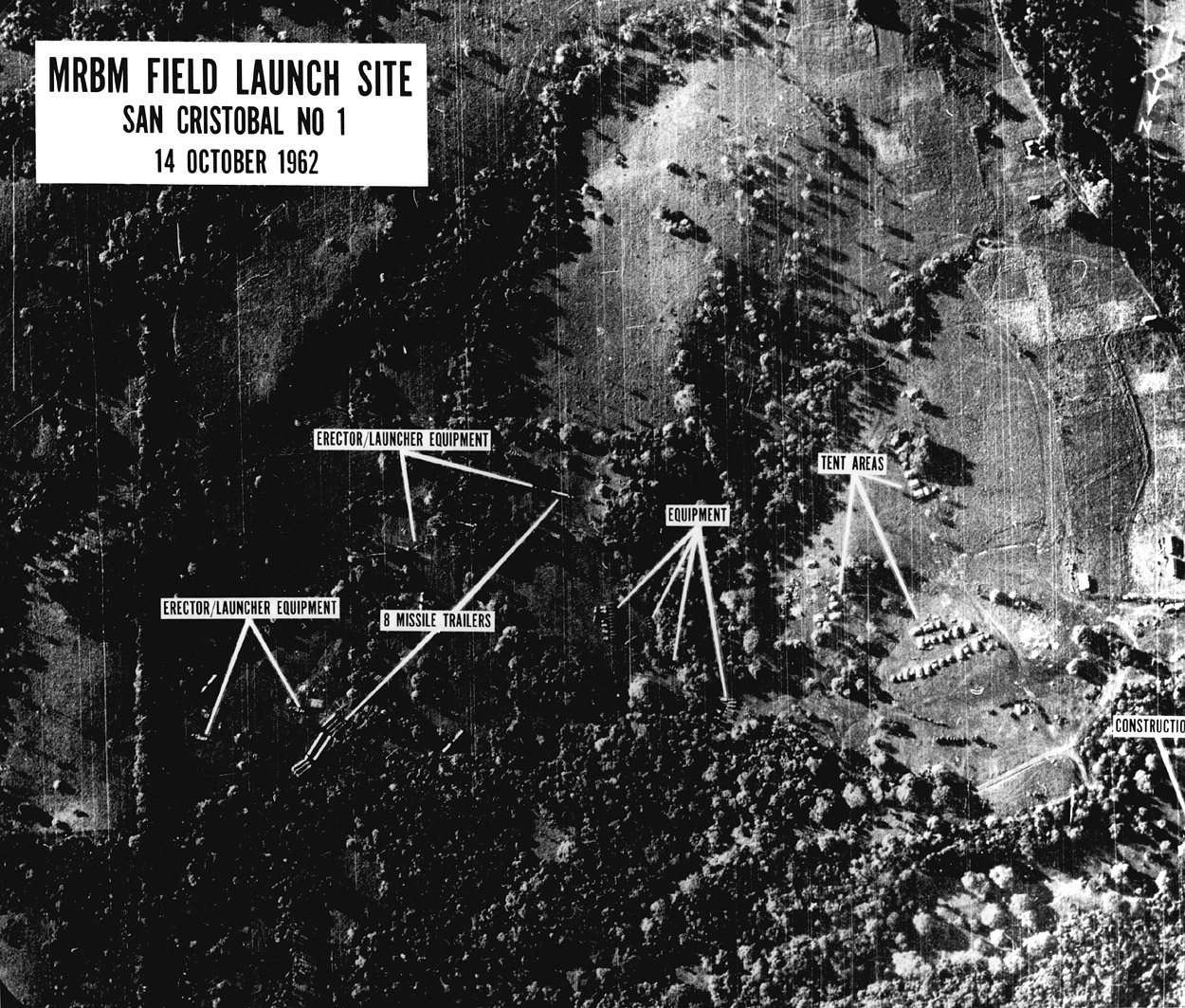
This aerial reconnaissance image of missile bases under construction in Cuba was shown to President Kennedy shortly before the Cuban Missile Crisis.

There are several types of geospatial intelligence (GEOINT), primarily that of knowing where something or someone is right now, knowing where that target was in the past, and knowing where that target will be in the future. Geospatial intelligence combines the practices of geospatial science with intelligence. GEOINT layers raw intelligence alongside geolocation and time to place activity at a specific location. GEOINT finds the locations of enemy forces or oppositional groups to both understand their intentions, and to coordinate strikes against them. GEOINT utilizes all of the tools available to place things in space; imagery intelligence, aerial reconnaissance, Global Positioning Systems, geographic information systems, cartography, geography, triangulation, remote sensing, Lidar, basic field reports, interrogative information.

GEOINT is not limited to the intelligence field, either. It can be used in any industry desiring of its products; agriculture, firefighting, and so on.

=== Knowledge of what and how ===
Evaluating the capabilities, fortifications, and load-out of an enemy force.
