= September 11 intelligence before the attacks =

Regarding 9/11 terrorist attacks

In the aftermath of the September 11 attacks on the United States, by the al-Qaeda terrorist group, a number of investigations were conducted to determine what intelligence may have existed before the attacks and whether this information was ignored by authorities.

== Clinton era report ==
In December 1998, the CIA's Counterterrorist Center reported to President Bill Clinton that al-Qaeda was preparing for attacks in the U.S. that might include hijacking aircraft.

Since 1999, information about the hijackers and the preparations for the eventual attack already held by the NSA and the CIA wasn't passed to the FBI until August 2001, primarily due to communications lapses between the agencies and the erroneous belief that said attacks wouldn't happen on US soil, but overseas.

A President's Daily Brief prepared for senior Clinton administration officials warned that Osama bin Laden's preferred option was to attack the United States, including the possibility that al-Qaeda might use an explosive-packed airplane against a U.S. city. The document was among several dozen presidential intelligence briefings declassified by the CIA on September 11, 2026, as part of a release marking the 25th anniversary of the September 11 attacks.

== April 2001 Massoud speech ==
Another warning came from Ahmad Shah Massoud, leader of the anti-Taliban Northern Alliance, in April 2001 in a speech before the European Parliament in Brussels, Belgium, in which he asked for humanitarian aid for the people of Afghanistan. Massoud told the parliament that his intelligence agents had gained limited knowledge about a large-scale terrorist attack on U.S. soil being imminent. Massoud was assassinated by al-Qaeda two days before the 9/11 attacks on September 9, 2001.

== Russian intelligence ==
On 9 September 2001, Russian President Vladimir Putin called Bush and expressed his concerns over Massoud's assassination, warning him that "something larger might be afoot".

== British intelligence ==
In the book MI6: Life and Death in the British Secret Service, Gordon Corera says that Britain's spy chiefs had known a terrorist attack was coming. Later, Richard Dearlove said that "the fact that a large-scale terrorist event occurred was not a surprise," and that "the fear was that it would be an attack against American interests probably not in the mainland". Eliza Manningham-Buller recalled that "we had prior intelligence that summer of Al-Qaeda planning a major attack" but that "we didn't know, nor did the Americans, where it was going to take place."

Nebulous reports had coagulated and then dissipated over the summer; in June 2001, British and American intelligence held one of their joint summits, according to Richard Dearlove "the primary topic of discussion was a major terrorist event," and that a routine meeting "turned into something not routine...there was an increase in chatter [intercepted communications], an increase in indicators." That month, the British passed on details that a senior Al Qaeda figure was planning car-bomb attacks against US targets in Saudi Arabia in the coming weeks, but the attack did not happen. A British report from 6 July 2001 read: "the most likely location for such an attack on western interests by UBL (Usama Bin Laden) and those that share his agenda is the Gulf States or the wider middle east." A JIC report that month said that attacks were in their final stage of preparation.

== Israeli intelligence ==
On 23 August 2001, the Mossad gave the CIA a list of 19 suspects living in the US who were believed to be mounting an imminent attack on the United States. Only four of the names are known, all belonging to eventual hijackers in the attacks — Mohamed Atta, Marwan al-Shehhi, Khalid al-Mihdhar, and Nawaf al-Hazmi — and it is not known if the list had 19 names by coincidence or if it had all the hijackers who would participate in the attacks.

== Algerian intelligence ==
The head of the Algerian state intelligence service DRS, General Mohamed Mediène, known as 'Toufik', had close ties with his counterparts in the US intelligence community, having been received at the Pentagon and CIA headquarters.

A few days before the attacks of 11 September 2001, he went on a confidential mission to the US. With his American interlocutors, he spoke of an imminent large-scale attack against the United States based on a secret memo sent on September 6, 2001 by Smaïn Lamari, the number two in the DRS at the time.

Shortly after the attacks, only two civilian planes were authorized to take off: the one carrying members of the Saudi royal family and people close to Bin Laden, and the one bringing Toufik to Algiers.

== Bush era reports ==
=== May 1, 2001 ===
On May 1, 2001, the CIA informed the White House that "a group presently in the United States" was in the process of planning a terrorist attack.

=== June 13, 2001 ===
On June 13, 2001, Osama bin Laden made a tape for supporters mentioning a possible attack on the G8 summit in Genoa, Italy. A copy of this tape and related information were obtained separately by Egyptian and Italian intelligence agencies and shared with the US. The plan was said to involve a plane packed with explosives being crashed into the summit to kill President Bush and other world leaders in attendance. The possible attack was widely reported in the days leading up to the summit, and Italy barred commercial air traffic from the area, deployed fighter jets to patrol, and positioned surface to air missiles around the meeting zone.

=== June 29, 2001 ===
The President's Daily Brief on June 29, 2001, stated that "[the United States] is not the target of a disinformation campaign by Osama Bin Laden". The document repeated evidence surrounding the threat, "including an interview that month with a Middle Eastern journalist in which Bin Laden aides warned of a coming attack, as well as competitive pressures that the terrorist leader was feeling, given the number of Islamists being recruited for the separatist Russian region of Chechnya."

The CIA reiterated that the attacks were anticipated to be near-term and have "dramatic consequences".

=== July 10, 2001 ===
On July 10, 2001, J. Cofer Black, CIA's counter-terrorism chief and George Tenet, CIA's director, met with Condoleezza Rice, the National Security Advisor, to inform her about communications intercepts and other top-secret intelligence showing the increasing likelihood that al-Qaeda would soon attack the United States. Rice listened but was unconvinced, having other priorities on which to focus. Secretary of Defense Donald Rumsfeld questioned the information suggesting it was a deception meant to gauge the U.S. response.

On the same day, FBI Special Agent Kenneth Williams sent a letter to FBI headquarters warning of suspects connected to al-Qaeda who were attending flight schools in Arizona, and demanding further investigation. This document is known as the Phoenix Memo.

=== August 6, 2001 ===
On August 6, 2001, the President's Daily Briefing, titled "Bin Ladin Determined To Strike in US", warned that bin Laden was planning to exploit his operatives' access to the U.S. to mount a terrorist strike: FBI information... indicates patterns of suspicious activity in this country, consistent with preparations for hijackings or other types of attack. Rice responded to the claims about the briefing in a statement before the 9/11 Commission stating the brief was "not prompted by any specific threat information" and "did not raise the possibility that terrorists might use airplanes as missiles."

== See also ==
- Ali Soufan
- Capture of Zacarias Moussaoui, August 16, 2001
- September 11 attacks advance-knowledge conspiracy theories
- Operation Bojinka - plot by Ramzi Yousef and Khalid Shaikh Mohammed, foiled in 1995, to attack multiple airliners and crash a plane into the CIA
