= Arthur Hulnick =

American intelligence officer and academic (1935–2018)

Art Hulnick

Director of the CIA Watch Office
- In office ?

Personal details
- Born: August 9, 1935 Stapleton, Staten Island, New York
- Died: April 18, 2018 (aged 82) Boston, Massachusetts
- Spouse: Eileen Brandt (1965)
- Awards: Career Intelligence Medal

Military service
- Branch/service: United States Air Force
- Rank: Captain
- Battles/wars: Cold War
- Academic career
- Known for: Progenitor of the "Matrix Model" of intelligence management
- Awards: Distinguished Scholar Award; Templeton Award

Academic background
- Education: Woodrow Wilson School, Princeton University

Academic work
- Discipline: Intelligence studies
- Institutions: Pardee School of Global Studies, Boston University
- Notable works: Fixing the Spy Machine; Keeping Us Safe; What’s Wrong with the Intelligence Cycle?

Arthur S. "Art" Hulnick was an American intelligence officer and academic, considered an impactful scholar in the field of Intelligence studies. During the Cold War, he served in the United States Air Force and helped interview North Korean defectors. During the course of his 28-year career at the Central Intelligence Agency (CIA), he ran the agency's Watch Office, served as speechwriter for CIA director William H. Webster, acted as a spokesman for the agency, and helped write, edit, and brief the President's Daily Brief. In 1989, Hulnick was appointed as the first-ever Officer in Residence at Boston University, where he taught courses in intelligence studies. He remained at BU after his retirement from the CIA in 1992, taking a position as a full-time lecturer. As an academic, his essay What's Wrong with the Intelligence Cycle? has become the most-cited article in the history of the journal Intelligence and National Security. In it and later essays building upon it, he argued for a complete replacement of the outdated Intelligence cycle with a newer, more refined theory of intelligence management that he called the "Matrix Model."

== Written works ==
- Fixing the Spy Machine: Preparing American Intelligence for the Twenty-First Century
- Keeping Us Safe: Secret Intelligence and Homeland Security
- What's Wrong with the Intelligence Cycle?
