= Officer in Residence =

Academic lecturer employed by the Central Intelligence Agency

An Officer in Residence (OIR) is an officer of the Central Intelligence Agency (CIA) who is officially stationed as a lecturer at an American university, usually teaching courses in intelligence studies, intelligence law, national security, and related disciplines. The program was established in 1985. Contrary to popular misconception OIRs are not recruiters, and from the earliest days of the program OIRs have been specifically prohibited from recruiting in any form whatsoever. The primary role of an OIR is to educate about and demystify the intelligence field for the world of academia. Students who take courses from OIR lecturers are under no obligation to join the agency. In 1987, protests were held on the campus of University of California, Santa Barbara where students said that the hiring of a CIA employee as a lecturer would be a tacit approval of torture and covert influence campaigns.

In 2018, a new and related program was initiated known as the Visiting Intelligence Officer program. Whereas the OIR program focuses on intelligence officers who are at the end of their careers and hold a vast sum of knowledge, the VIO program hosts officers who are at an earlier stage in their careers.

Over 40 US universities and colleges have hosted OIRs since the program's inception. Schools that have hosted OIRs include:

- Dartmouth College
- Harvard University
- Rochester Institute of Technology
- University of Miami
- Georgetown University
- University of Texas
- Texas A&M University
- Columbia University
- University of Washington
- Boston University
- Virginia Tech
- Princeton University
- Marquette University
- George Washington University
- University of Illinois Chicago
- Winston-Salem State University
- University of Pittsburgh
- West Virginia University

== See also ==
- Diplomat-in-residence
- Wikipedian in residence
- National Intelligence University
