= Intelligence law =

Field of law dealing with the intelligence field

Intelligence Law is the field of law that relates specifically to the fields of intelligence and espionage; the legality of domestic and foreign intelligence gathered by states, and the illegality of the same activities within the borders of any state.

== Description ==
Intelligence law covers whatever laws that legitimize the existence of intelligence agencies, whether those are public sector, military, or commercial in nature. Intelligence law also covers the criminal proceedings regarding the capture and prosecution of foreign agents captured on a state's sovereign territory.

Intelligence law is closely related to the fields of National Security Law, Criminal Law, and Military Law, and will often blend and crossover into those areas, especially considering the fact that some governments only possess military intelligence mechanisms, and no civilian government agency variants. It should also be noted that experts in intelligence law must also be practitioners of immigration law, and the fact that deportation proceedings are often an immediate reaction to most captures of foreign intelligence officers on a state's sovereign territory should be considered.

However, some forms of intelligence law can also create legal frameworks within states for operations that violate international law, such as; human rights violations, repression of citizens, secret assassinations and murder, state terrorism, state-sponsored terrorism, arms dealing, extraordinary rendition, torture, kidnapping, false imprisonment and more.

== See also ==
- Accountability
- Intelligence literature
- Intelligence studies
- National Security Act of 1947
- Security sector governance and reform
- Category:Whistleblower protection legislation
