= WEP =

WEP may stand for:

- Abbreviation of weapon
- War emergency power, an engine mode for military aircraft
- Weak equivalence principle, in relativity theory
- West European Politics, a journal of comparative politics
- Wetland Park stop, MTR station code
- the pen name of Australian cartoonist William Edwin Pidgeon (1909–1981)
- Windfall Elimination Provision, a statutory provision of the U.S. Social Security system
- Wired Equivalent Privacy (WEP), a wireless network security standard (sometimes mistakenly referred to as "Wireless Encryption Protocol")
- Words of estimative probability, terms used to convey the likelihood of a future event
- Women's Equality Party, political party in the United Kingdom
- Women's Equality Party (New York), political party in the United States
- World Events Productions, an American animation and distribution company
- Wisconsin Experiment Package, an instrument aboard the space telescope Orbiting Astronomical Observatory 2
- Wonder Egg Priority, a Japanese anime series
- Microsoft Entertainment Pack, also known as Windows Entertainment Pack or Simply WEP, a collection of 16-bit casual computer games for Windows published by Microsoft in early 1990s.
