= Bandaranaike Academy for Leadership and Public Policy =

The Bandaranaike Academy for Leadership and Public Policy
- Parent institution: S. W. R. D. Bandaranaike National Memorial Foundation (BNMF)
- Founder: Chandrika Bandaranaike Kumaratunga
- Established: 2023
- Focus: Leadership and Strategy, Public Policy
- Address: BMICH, Block 05, Bauddhaloka Mawatha, Colombo 07
- Location: Sri Lanka
- Website: https://www.balpp.com/

The Bandaranaike Academy for Leadership and Public Policy (BALPP) is a Sri Lankan independent and nonpartisan institution specialising in leadership and public policy education, research and public engagement. Established in 2023 and based at the Bandaranaike Memorial International Conference Hall (BMICH) in Colombo, the academy is intended to focus on policy research, academic programmes and forums bringing together academics, policymakers and politicians, with a focus on contemporary issues of public policy and governance and their implications for Sri Lanka and the region. The Sunday Times described it at the time of its establishment as the first institute in Sri Lanka where education and training in public policy, coupled with strategic leadership, were the principal focus.

The academy was created within the institutional framework of the Bandaranaike Memorial National Foundation, which was created under the S. W. R. D. Bandaranaike National Memorial Foundation Act No. 2 of 1975. Former President of Sri Lanka Chandrika Kumaratunga serves as its founding chairperson. Dr. Tara de Mel, who previously served as Adviser to the President on Education and Social Infrastructure and as Secretary to the Ministry of Education and Higher Education, is the academy's founding Executive Director.

== History ==
The academy developed from the Youth Leadership Academy (YLA) programme at the Bandaranaike Centre for International Studies (BCIS), an initiative of former President Chandrika Kumaratunga to cultivate a new generation of visionary and globally minded leaders drawn from across Sri Lanka.

The initiative emerged amid a period of profound political and economic upheaval in Sri Lanka. The Aragalaya, the mass protest movement of 2022, brought longstanding questions about political leadership, governance and accountability into wider public debate. The movement's demands for "system change" reflected broader dissatisfaction with the political establishment and with the quality and accountability of political leadership. At the same time, the largely decentralised and leaderless character of the Aragalaya prompted debate about the role of leadership itself and the need for a new generation of capable and accountable leaders.

As a result, the YLA initiative was expanded beyond its original focus on youth leadership development to encompass public policy and governance, leading to the establishment of the Bandaranaike Academy for Leadership and Public Policy in 2023.

== Academic programmes and areas of study ==
BALPP's academic activities combine leadership and strategy education with the study of public policy and related fields. Its initial programmes included postgraduate study in strategic leadership, economic policy, education policy and analysis, politics and governance, and cybersecurity policy.

The academy subsequently expanded its academic activities into specialised and emerging areas of public policy. It introduced dedicated programmes in intelligence studies, artificial intelligence policy, climate resilience policy, and energy policy. These represented the first dedicated academic or professional programmes in Sri Lanka in each of these fields, bringing disciplines that had not previously been formally offered to the Sri Lankan public into the country's policy-education landscape.

== Partnerships and collaborations ==
The academy maintains a collaborative relationship with the Parliament of Sri Lanka, through which it provides leadership and professional development programmes for parliamentary officers. This relationship also offers BALPP students opportunities to gain insight into the work of Parliament and the legislative process.

It has also collaborated with organizations such as the South Asia Co-operative Environment Program (SACEP), National Science Foundation, International Labour Organization (ILO), Sarvodaya and the United Nations Development Program (UNDP).
