= National Security Act =

National Security Act may refer to:

- National Security Act, 1980, an Indian law to provide for preventive detention
- National Security Act (South Korea), regarding seditious activities
- National Security Act of 1947, a United States law that established the Central Intelligence Agency
- National Security Act 2017, a Canadian act
- National Security Act 2023 (c. 32), a UK act strengthening laws against espionage, political interference, sabotage, and assassination

National Security Law may refer to:

- National Security Law of the United States
- National Security Law of the People's Republic of China
- National Security Laws of China's Special Administrative Regions, i.e.:
  - Macau National Security Law
  - 2020 Hong Kong national security law
- National Security Law (Brazil)
