= Phoenix Memo =

2001 letter sent to FBI headquarters

The Phoenix Memo is a letter sent to FBI headquarters on July 10, 2001, by FBI Special Agent Kenneth Williams, recommending assembling a worldwide listing of civil aviation schools. Williams, then stationed in Phoenix, Arizona, was investigating students at some of these schools for possible terrorist links.

== Content ==
The memo states that its purpose is to:

Advise the Bureau and New York of the possibility of a coordinated effort by Osama bin Laden to send students to the United States to attend civil aviation universities and colleges. Phoenix has observed an inordinate number of individuals of investigative interest who are attending or who have attended civil aviation universities and colleges in the State of Arizona.

The recommendations outlined by Williams were ignored or put aside because of other concerns. At least one dozen FBI officials saw the memo. Still, it was never passed to acting director Thomas J. Pickard, his successor Robert Mueller, or the Central Intelligence Agency. In addition, the memo's existence was not made known to President George W. Bush and his senior national security staff until May 2002.

Mueller told the U.S. Congress in an emotional hearing in May 2002 that the FBI's failure to act on the memo resulted from deficits in its analytical capabilities.

== Coleen Rowley (2002) ==
The memo became the subject of another communiqué in June 2002, when FBI Agent Coleen Rowley took advantage of the federal Whistleblower Protection Act provisions to inform FBI Director Robert Mueller that his public statements about lack of "advance knowledge" by the bureau had no basis. In her memo, Rowley wrote about the alleged suppression of the investigation concerning Zacarias Moussaoui.

== See also ==
- Bin Ladin Determined To Strike in US, August 6, 2001
- Capture of Zacarias Moussaoui, August 16, 2001
- Khalid al-Mihdhar
- Nawaf al-Hazmi
- Risk aversion
