= Bin Ladin Determined To Strike in US =

2001 US presidential intelligence memo

- The briefing
- Created: August 6, 2001
- Presented: July 22, 2004 (public)
- Media type: President's Daily Brief
- Subject: Terrorism threats indicating the September 11 attacks

"Bin Ladin Determined To Strike in US" is a President's Daily Brief prepared by the Central Intelligence Agency that was given to U.S. president George W. Bush on Monday, August 6, 2001. The brief warned, 36 days before the September 11 attacks, of terrorism threats from Osama bin Laden and al-Qaeda, including "patterns of suspicious activity in this country consistent with preparations for a hijacking" of U.S. aircraft.

== President's Daily Brief ==
The President's Daily Brief (PDB) is a brief of crucial classified information on national security collected by various U.S. intelligence agencies given to the president and a select group of senior officials. On August 6, 2001, the Central Intelligence Agency delivered a President's Daily Brief to President Bush, who was vacationing at his ranch in Crawford, Texas.

President Bush's response of "All right. You've covered your ass" has been erroneously linked to this PDB. This response, however, came from a separate PDB linked to Bin Laden from several months earlier. During 2001, CIA analysts produced several reports warning of imminent attacks by Bin Laden and al-Qaeda. Senior officials, including Vice President Dick Cheney and staff from Donald Rumsfeld's office at the Department of Defense, questioned whether these reports might not be deception on the part of al-Qaeda, purposely designed to expend resources in response needlessly. After re-evaluating the legitimate risks of these recent reports, CIA analysts produced a report titled "UBL [Usama Bin Laden] Threats Are Real." It was after this report that the president gave that now-infamous response.

== Release ==
Like all but a handful of PDBs, the memo's content was kept secret until it was leaked in 2002. CBS Evening News reported on the document on May 15.

The PDB was declassified and approved for release to the 9/11 Commission on April 10, 2004, and was included in the commission's 9/11 Commission Report, published on July 22, 2004. According to the National Security Archive, President Bush was the first sitting president to release a PDB to the public.

== Analysis ==
In response to accusations that the administration failed to act on the contents of the briefing, U.S. secretary of state Condoleezza Rice and General Richard Myers emphasized that the CIA's PDB did not warn the president of a specific new threat but "contained historical information based on old reporting."

== See also ==
- Phoenix Memo, July 10, 2001
