= Intelligence community =

Intelligence community may refer to:

- Australian intelligence community
- Bangladeshi intelligence community
- Croatian security and intelligence system
- French intelligence agencies
- Indian Intelligence Community
- Israeli intelligence community
- Italian intelligence agencies
- New Zealand intelligence agencies
- Pakistani intelligence community
- Russian intelligence agencies
- United Kingdom intelligence agencies
- United States Intelligence Community

== See also ==
- List of intelligence agencies
