= Raw intelligence =

Raw data gathered by an intelligence operation

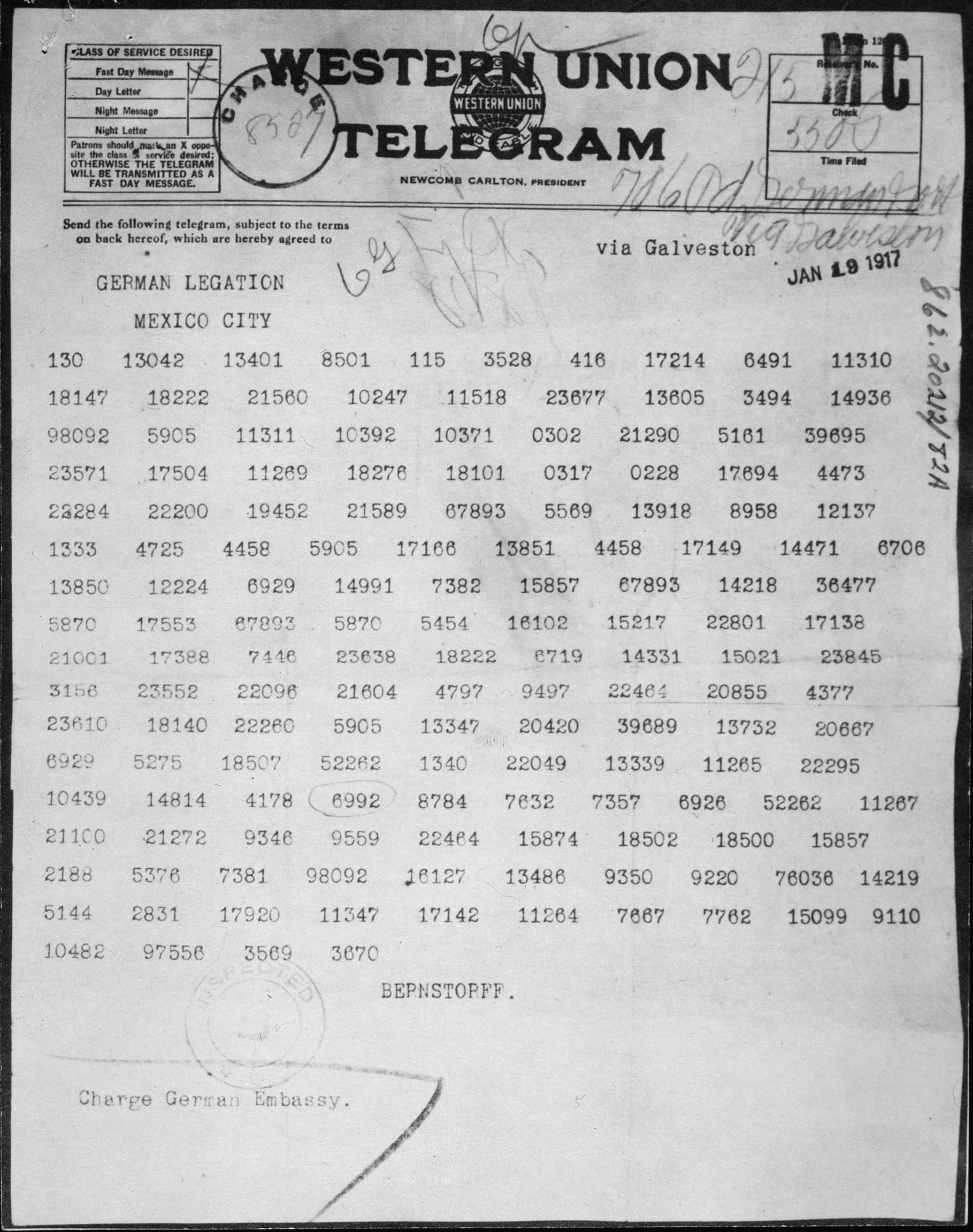
The Zimmermann telegram which was sent by Arthur Zimmermann, proposing an alliance between Germany and Mexico in the First World War. When intercepted by the British, this raw intelligence required decryption, translation and confirmation and then was still just part of the overall case made for US entry into the conflict.

Raw intelligence is raw data gathered by an intelligence operation, such as espionage or signal interception. Such data commonly requires processing and analysis to make it useful and reliable. To turn the raw intelligence into a finished form, the steps required may include decryption, translation, collation, evaluation and confirmation.

In the period after the First World War, British practise was to circulate raw intelligence with little analysis or context. Such direct intelligence was a strong influence on policy-makers. Churchill was especially keen to see raw intelligence and was supplied this by Desmond Morton during his period outside the government. When Churchill became Prime Minister in 1940, he still insisted on receiving raw intelligence and wanted it all until it was explained that the volume was now too great. A selection of daily intercepts was provided to him each day by Bletchley Park and he called these his "golden eggs".

US intelligence has a different tradition from the British. The key event for the US was the failure to prevent the attack on Pearl Harbor and the inquiries which followed concluded that this was not due to the lack of raw intelligence so much as the failure to make effective use of it. The Central Intelligence Agency was created to collate, analyse and summarise the raw intelligence collected by the other departments. US agencies which focus on the collection of raw intelligence include the National Reconnaissance Office and the National Security Agency.

== See also ==
- Source (intelligence)
