= Intelligence studies =

Academic Field

Intelligence studies is an interdisciplinary academic field that concerns intelligence assessment and intelligence analysis. Intelligence has been referred to as the "lost dimension" of the fields of international relations (IR) and diplomatic history, as the secretive nature of the subject means most intelligence successes are unknown.

== Academic Study ==
Among the academic journals concentrating on the subject are the Intelligence and National Security and International Journal of Intelligence and CounterIntelligence while other periodicals in the fields of IR and security studies, such as International Security, publish articles concerned with intelligence studies regularly.

Many universities, such as Aberystwyth, teach intelligence studies as an independent degree or as part of courses in IR, security studies, military science or related subjects.

In Sri Lanka, the Bandaranaike Academy for Leadership and Public Policy (BALPP) launched the country's first public programme in intelligence studies in 2025, introducing the subject as a formal area of study for participants outside the country's intelligence and security services.

== Intelligence studies and international relations ==
Until recently, IR scholars had limited interest in intelligence assessment. Even historical strategists such as Clausewitz and Machiavelli paid scant attention to intelligence. In British universities, intelligence studies developed within international history departments, while in US institutions it became the preserve of political science, and even then the subject was approached in terms of public policy and decision-making rather than IR. Recently attempts to connect intelligence studies with international relations theory have emerged, such as Andrew Rathmell's work on a postmodern theory of intelligence.

According to a 2020 forum in International Studies Review, there are five factors that have generally been important in the development of intelligence studies subfields in different countries: "access to relevant government information, institutionalization of research on intelligence and security in a higher education setting, periodic scientific meetings and networks, teaching and learning opportunities, and engagement between researchers and practitioners."

== Bibliography ==
- Jackson, Peter and Scott, Len (2005). "Intelligence", ed. Finney, Patrick: Palgrave Advances in International History. Palgrave Macmillan
- Evans, Graham and Newnham, Jeffrey (1998). The Penguin Dictionary of International Relations. Penguin
