= President's Daily Brief =

Daily US president intelligence briefing

External videos
- Presentation by Priess on The President's Book of Secrets, April 6, 2016, C-SPAN

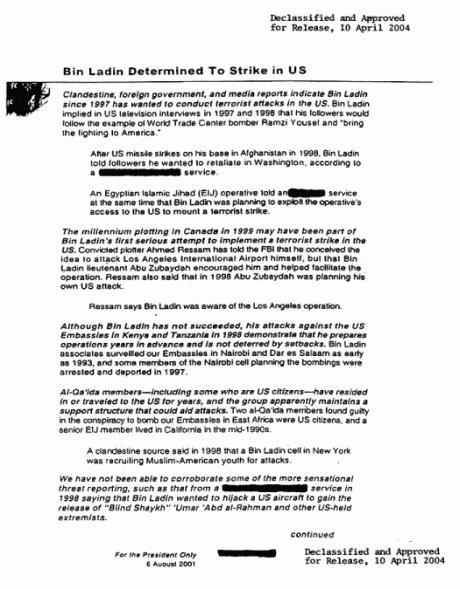
Excerpt from the declassified copy of the President's Daily Brief, dated August 6, 2001

The President's Daily Brief (PDB), sometimes referred to as the President's Daily Briefing or the President's Daily Bulletin, is a top-secret document produced and given each morning to the president of the United States; it is also distributed to a small number of top-level US officials who are approved by the president. It includes highly classified intelligence analysis, information about covert operations, and reports from the most sensitive US sources or those shared by allied intelligence agencies. At the discretion of the president, the PDB may also be provided to the president-elect of the United States, between election day and inauguration, and to former presidents on request.

The PDB is produced by the director of national intelligence, and involves fusing intelligence from the Central Intelligence Agency (CIA), the Defense Intelligence Agency (DIA), the National Security Agency (NSA), the Federal Bureau of Investigation (FBI), the Defense Department, Homeland Security and other members of the U.S. Intelligence Community.

== Purpose and history ==
The need for daily updates for the US president on world affairs became critical following the World War II, as crises around the world developed rapidly. The first routine intelligence briefings began in 1946, as President Truman began to receive a daily summary.

A prototype of the PDB termed the President's Intelligence Check List (PICL) was first produced by CIA officer Richard Lehman at the direction of Huntington D. Sheldon on June 17, 1961, for John F. Kennedy. The PDB was introduced in 1964 to meet the desires of Lyndon B. Johnson.

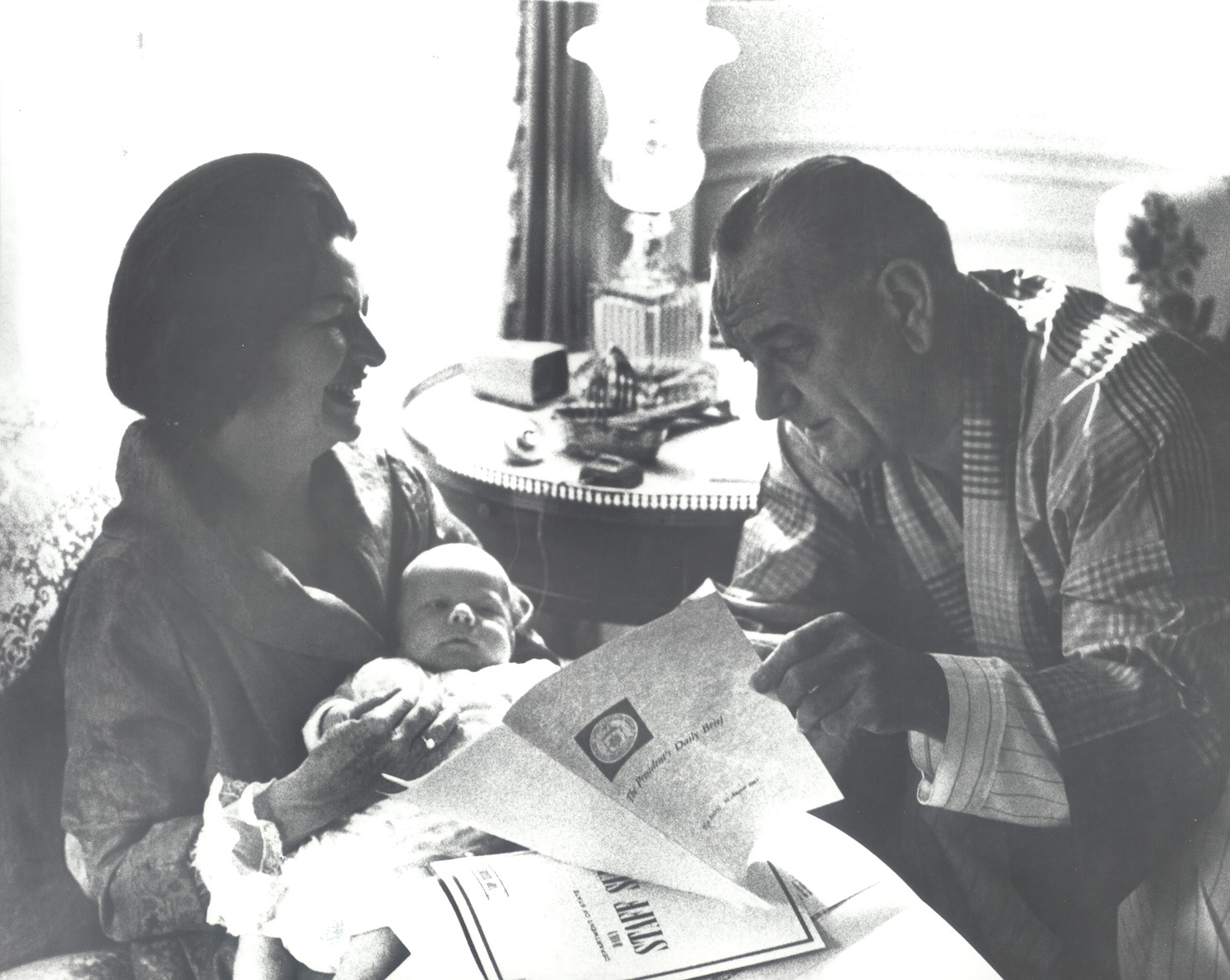
President Lyndon B. Johnson and First Lady Lady Bird Johnson read the Presidential Daily Brief aloud to their grandchild, Patrick Lyndon Nugent, for story time.

Although the production and coordination of the PDB was a CIA responsibility, other members of the U.S. intelligence community reviewed articles (the "coordination" process) and were free to write and submit articles for inclusion.

The PDB is intended to provide the president with new intelligence warranting attention and analysis of sensitive international situations. While the name of the PDB implies exclusivity, it has historically been briefed to other high officials. The distribution list has varied over time but has always or almost always included the vice president, secretaries of state and defense and the national security advisor. Rarely, special editions of the PDB have actually been "for the president's eyes only," with further dissemination of the information left to the president's discretion.

Production of the PDB is associated with that of another publication, historically known as the National Intelligence Daily, that includes many of the same items but is distributed considerably more widely than the PDB.

== Sources ==
The PDB is an all-source intelligence product summarized from all collecting agencies. The Washington Post noted that a leaked document indicated that the PRISM SIGAD (US-984) run by the NSA is "the number one source of raw intelligence used for NSA analytic reports." The PDB cited PRISM data as a source in 1,477 items in the 2012 calendar year. Declassified documents show that as of January 2001 over 60% of material in the PDB was sourced from signals intelligence (SIGINT). According to the National Security Archive, the percentage of SIGINT-sourced material has likely increased since then.

== Political importance ==
Former CIA director George Tenet considered the PDB so sensitive that during July 2000 he indicated to the National Archives and Records Administration that none of them could be released for publication "no matter how old or historically significant it may be."

During a briefing on May 21, 2002, Ari Fleischer, former White House press secretary, characterized the PDB as "the most highly sensitized classified document in the government."

On September 16, 2015, CIA director John Brennan spoke at the LBJ Presidential Library, at the public release of a total of 2,500 daily briefs and intelligence checklists from the John F. Kennedy and Lyndon B. Johnson presidencies. The release was a reversal of the government's previous stance in legal briefs attempting to keep the PDB indefinitely classified. On August 24, 2016, the CIA released a further 2,500 briefs from the Richard Nixon and Gerald Ford presidencies at a symposium held at the Nixon Presidential Library.

== Public awareness ==
The PDB was scrutinized by news media during testimony to the 9/11 Commission, which was convened during 2004 to analyze the September 11, 2001, attacks. On April 8, 2004, after testimony by National Security Advisor Condoleezza Rice, the commission renewed calls for the declassification of a PDB from August 6, 2001, entitled Bin Ladin Determined To Strike in US. Two days later, the White House complied and released the document with redaction.

== Usage by presidents and presidents-elect ==
During the 2012 re-election campaign, a former Bush administration official and President Barack Obama critic reported that "officials tell me the former president [Bush] held his intelligence meeting six days a week, no exceptions" (for a putative 86% in-person attendance record) though "Bush records [were] not yet available electronically for analysis".

Obama records, by contrast in this analysis, showed that during "his first 1,225 days in office, Obama attended his PDB just 536 times—or 43.8 percent of the time. During 2011 and the first half of 2012 [within the 1,225 days analyzed], his attendance ... [fell] to just over 38 percent." Obama initiated electronic delivery of the written brief in 2014 and received it six days a week.

In the first six weeks of the first presidential transition of Donald Trump in 2016, the president-elect averaged about one PDB a week. He had "participated in multiple PDBs in some weeks, CNN has learned. And the transition team said last week Trump would be increasing his PDB participation to three times a week." However, by the final weeks of his presidency Trump didn't have a single PDB listed on his schedule.

During the presidential transition of Joe Biden in 2020, Biden and Vice President-elect Kamala Harris gained access to the PDB in late November 2020. Upon taking office, Biden started committing to receiving the PDB on most days, with Harris in attendance.

In the second presidential transition of Donald Trump in 2024, President-elect Trump began to receive PDBs starting in November 2024. On May 9, 2025, Politico reported that Trump had sat for only 12 PDBs since taking office, which would be an average of one PDB every nine days.
