= Foreign policy of the Reagan administration =

American foreign policy during the presidency of Ronald Reagan (1981–1989) focused heavily on the Cold War which shifted from détente to confrontation. The Reagan administration pursued a policy of rollback with regard to communist regimes. The Reagan Doctrine operationalized these goals as the United States offered financial, logistical, training, and military equipment to anti-communist opposition in Afghanistan, Angola, and Nicaragua. He expanded support to anti-communist movements in Central and Eastern Europe.

By 1982, the Reagan-led CIA had in fact regarded Libya, the Soviet Union, and Cuba to be "some sort of unholy trinity," with controversial Libyan leader Muammar Gaddafi being "our international public enemy number one."

Reagan's foreign policy also saw major shifts with regard to the Middle East. US intervention in the Lebanese Civil War was halted as Reagan ordered an evacuation of troops following the 1983 Marine Corps Barracks Attack. The 1979 Iran hostage crisis in Tehran strained relations with Iran and during the Iran-Iraq War, the administration publicly supported Iraq and sold weapons to Saddam Hussein.

Anti-communism was at the forefront with Reagan's Latin American foreign policy and the US supported forces fighting communist insurgencies or governments. As his administration progressed, opposition to continued US aid for these groups began to gather steam in Congress. Eventually, Congress forbade any US financial or material aid to certain anti-communist groups, among them the Contras in Nicaragua. In response, the Reagan administration facilitated covert arms sales to Iran and used the proceeds to fund Latin American anti-communists. The fallout from the Iran-Contra affair dominated Reagan's second term in office.

His policies are credited to have helped weaken the Soviet Union and its control over Warsaw Pact countries, although scholars have pushed back against giving Reagan the lion's share of the credit. Western confrontation combined with the Soviet Union's mishandling of domestic affairs led to its weakening and ultimate dissolution. In 1989, after Reagan left office, the Revolutions of 1989 saw Eastern European countries overthrow their communist regimes. Following the Soviet Union's dissolution in 1991 the United States emerged as the world's sole superpower and Reagan's successor George H.W. Bush sought to improve relations with former communist regimes in Russia and Eastern Europe.

== Appointments ==
Reagan's 1985 foreign policy team

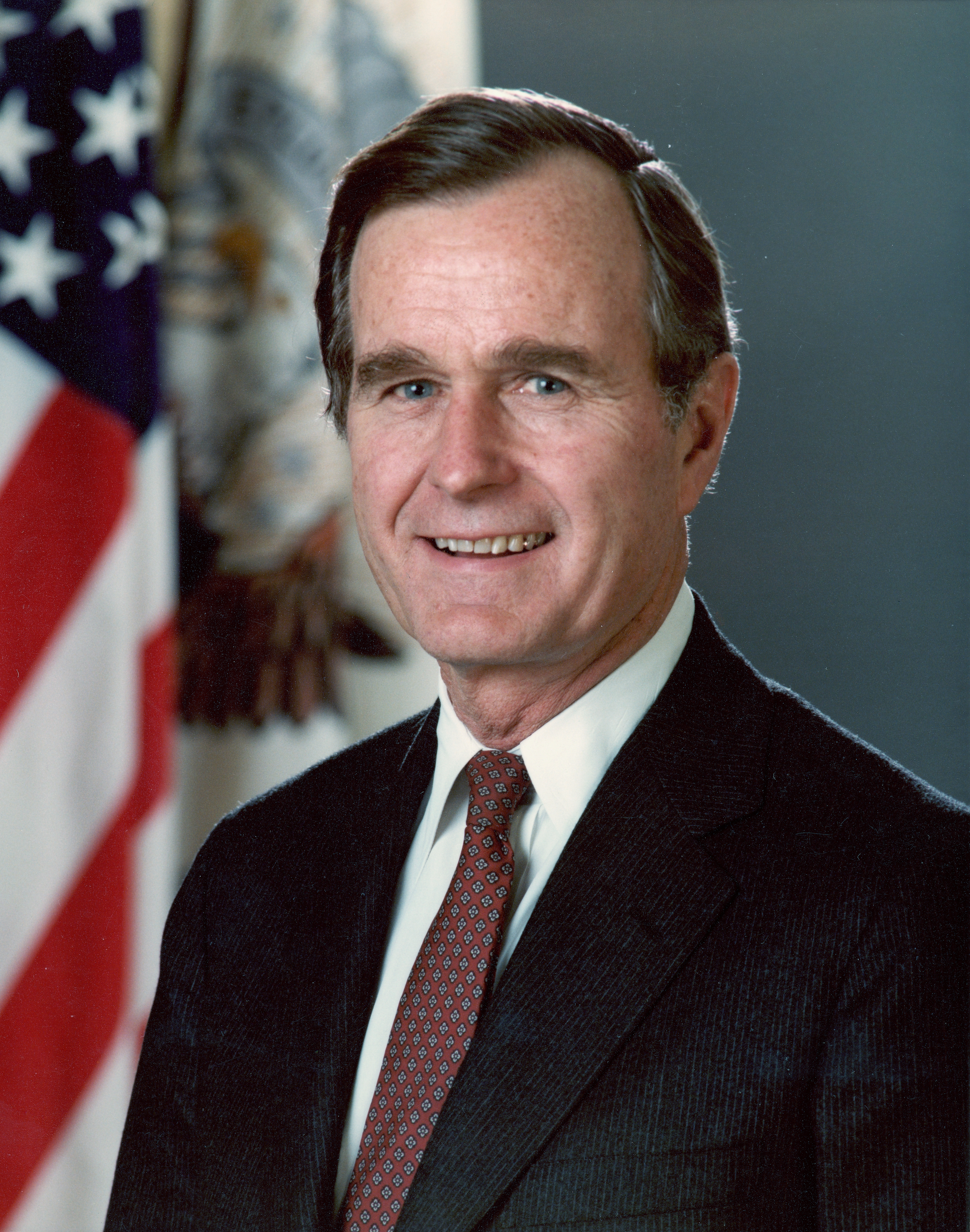
George H. W. Bush

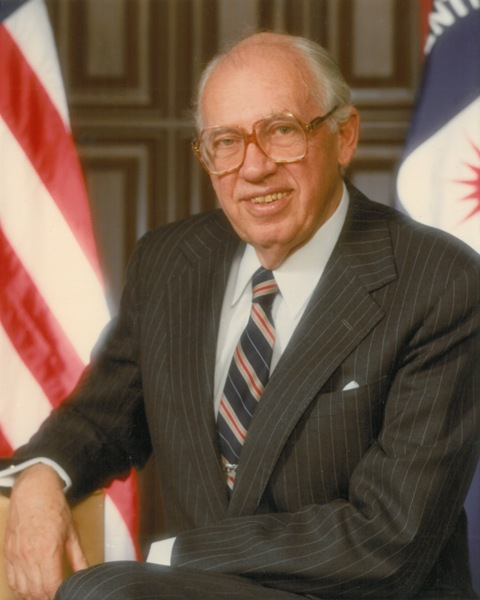
William J. Casey

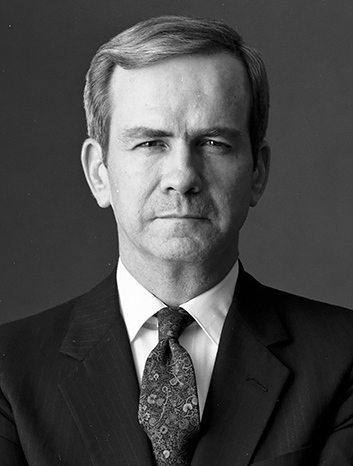
Robert McFarlane

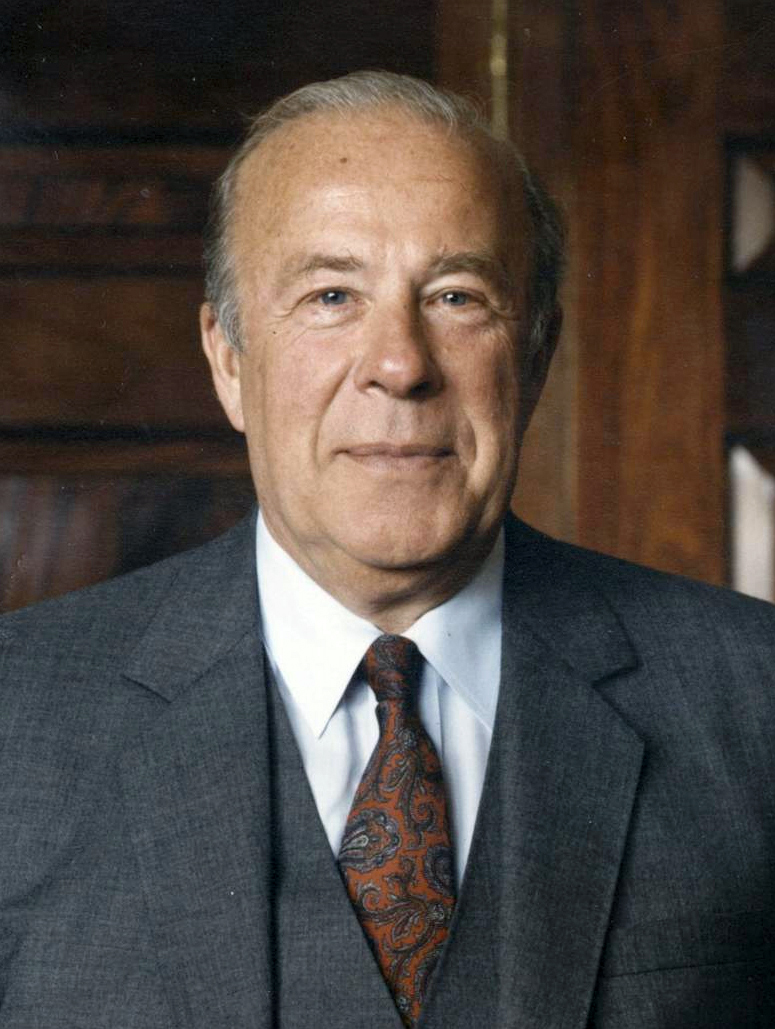
George Shultz

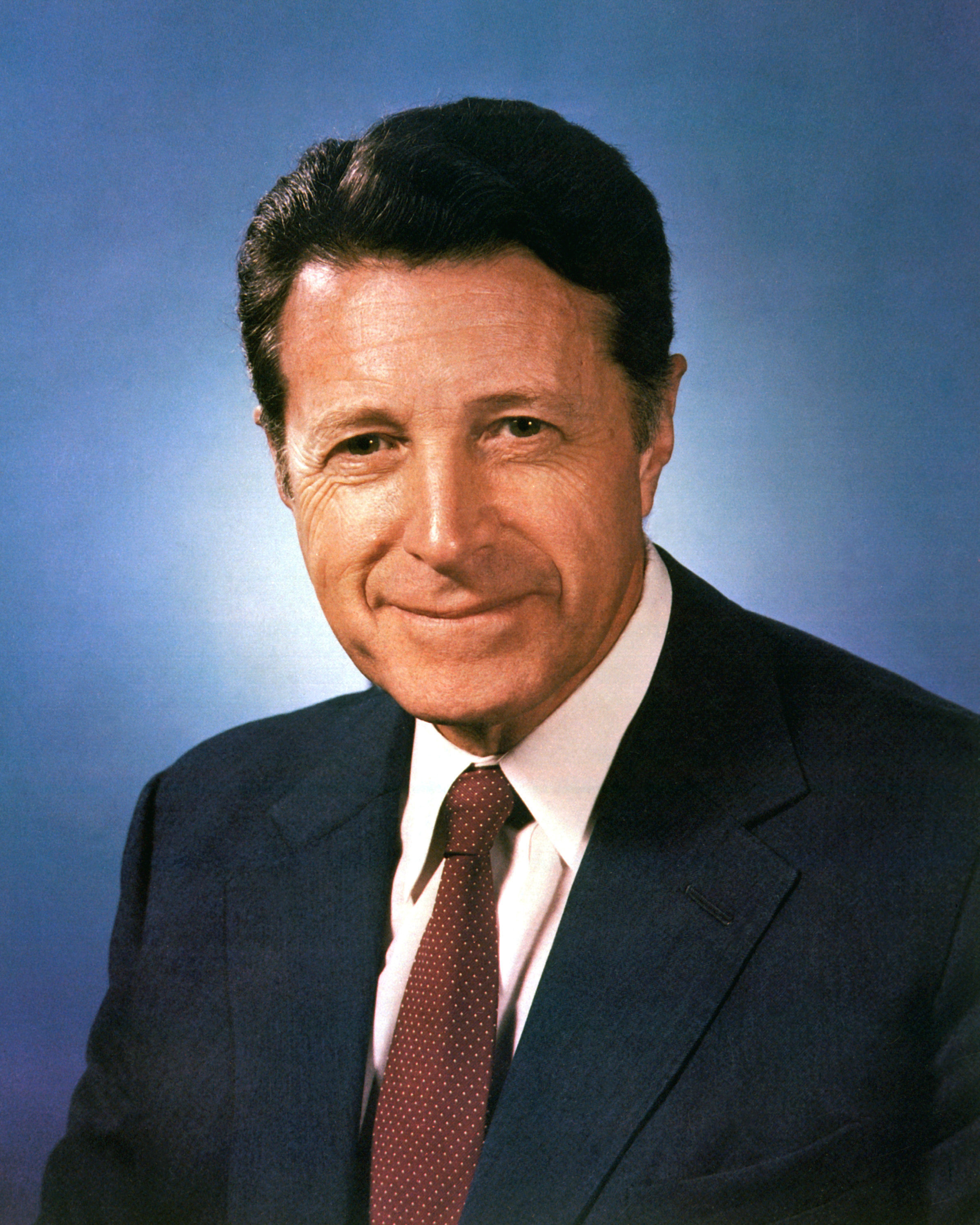
Caspar Weinberger

Reagan administration foreign policy personnel
| Vice President | Bush (1981–1989) | | | | | | |
| Secretary of State | Haig (1981–1982) | Shultz (1982–1989) | | | | | |
| Secretary of Defense | Weinberger (1981–1987) | | | | | | Carlucci (1987–1989) |
| Ambassador to the United Nations | Kirkpatrick (1981–1985) | | | Walters (1985–1989) | | | |
| Director of Central Intelligence | Casey (1981–1987) | | | | | | William H. Webster (1987–1989) |
| Assistant to the President for National Security Affairs | Allen (1981–1982) | Clark (1982–1983) | McFarlane (1983–1985) | Poindexter (1985–1986) | Carlucci (1986–1987) | | Powell (1987–1989) |
| Deputy Assistant to the President for National Security Affairs | Nance (1981–1982) | McFarlane (1982–1983) | Poindexter (1983–1985) | Fortier (1985–1986) | Rodman (1986) | Powell (1986–1987) | Negroponte (1987–1989) |
| Trade Representative | Brock (1981–1985) | | | Yeutter (1985–1989) | | | |

== Eastern Europe and the USSR ==
Reagan had close friendships with key political leaders across the globe, especially the two strong conservatives Margaret Thatcher in Britain, and Brian Mulroney in Canada. He and Thatcher provided mutual support in terms of fighting liberalism, reducing the welfare state, and confronting the Soviet Union in what turned out to be the final years of the Cold War.

Reagan ultimately departed from the historical policy of détente with the Soviet Union, which had been followed after World War II by consecutive U.S. presidents, including Richard Nixon, Gerald Ford, and Jimmy Carter. The Reagan administration implemented a new policy towards the Soviet Union, detailed in NSDD-32, a National Security Decisions Directive, to begin confronting the Soviet Union on three fronts: decreasing Soviet access to high technology and diminishing their resources, including depressing the value of Soviet commodities on the world market; to (also) increase American defense expenditures to strengthen the U.S. negotiating position; and to force the Soviets to devote more of their economic resources to defense. The massive American military build-up was the most visible.

Reagan supported anti-communist groups around the world. In a policy known as the "Reagan Doctrine", his administration promised aid and counterinsurgency assistance to right-wing repressive regimes, such as the Marcos dictatorship in the Philippines, the South African apartheid government, and the Hissène Habré dictatorship in Chad, as well as to guerrilla movements opposing governments linked to the Soviet Union, such as the Contras in Nicaragua, the Mujahideen in Afghanistan, and the UNITA in Angola. During the Soviet–Afghan War, Reagan deployed the CIA's Special Activities Division (SAD) Paramilitary Officers to train, equip, and lead the Mujahideen forces against the Soviet Army. Although the CIA (in general) and U.S. Congressman Charlie Wilson from Texas have received most of the attention, the key architect of this strategy was Michael G. Vickers, a young Paramilitary Officer. President Reagan's Covert Action program has been given credit for assisting in ending the Soviet occupation of Afghanistan. When the Polish government suppressed the Solidarity movement in late 1981, Reagan imposed economic sanctions on the People's Republic of Poland.

In its national security policies, the administration Reagan administration revived the B-1 bomber program in 1981 that had been canceled by the Carter administration, continued secret development of the B-2 Spirit that Carter intended to replace the B-1, and began production of the MX "Peacekeeper" missile. In response to Soviet deployment of the RSD-10 Pioneer and in accordance with NATO's double-track decision, the administration deployed Pershing II missiles in West Germany to gain a stronger bargaining position to eventually eliminate that entire class of nuclear weapons. His position was that if the Soviets did not remove the RSD-10 missiles (without a concession from the US), America would simply introduce the Pershing II missiles for a stronger bargaining position, and both missiles would be eliminated.

One of Reagan's proposals was the Strategic Defense Initiative (SDI). He believed this defense shield could make nuclear war impossible, but the unlikelihood that the technology could ever work led opponents to dub SDI "Star Wars". Critics of the SDI believed that the technological objective was unattainable, that the attempt would likely accelerate the arms race, and that the extraordinary expenditures amounted to a military-industrial boondoggle. Supporters responded that the SDI gave the President a stronger bargaining position. Indeed, Soviet leaders became genuinely concerned.

Reagan believed that the American economy was on the move again while the Soviet economy had become stagnant. For a while, the Soviet decline was masked by high prices for Soviet oil exports, but that crutch collapsed in the early-1980s. In November 1985, the oil price was $30/barrel for crude, and in March 1986, it had fallen to only $12.

Reagan's militant rhetoric inspired dissidents in the Soviet Empire, but also startled allies and alarmed critics. In a famous address to the National Association of Evangelicals on March 8, 1983, he called the Soviet Union an "evil empire" that would be consigned to the "ash heap of history". After Soviet fighters downed Korean Airlines Flight 007 on September 1, 1983, he labeled the act an "act of barbarism ... [of] inhuman brutality". Reagan's description of the Soviet Union as an "evil empire" drew the wrath of some as provocative, but his description was staunchly defended by his conservative supporters. Michael Johns of The Heritage Foundation prominently defended Reagan in a Policy Review article, "Seventy Years of Evil", in which he identified 208 alleged acts of evil by the Soviet Union since the Bolshevik Revolution in 1917.

On March 3, 1983, Reagan predicted that communism would collapse: "I believe that communism is another sad, bizarre chapter in human history whose—last pages even now are being written", he said. He elaborated on June 8, 1982, to the British Parliament. Reagan argued that the Soviet Union was in deep economic crisis and stated that the Soviet Union "runs against the tide of history by denying human freedom and human dignity to its citizens."

This was before Gorbachev rose to power in 1985. Reagan later wrote in his autobiography An American Life that he "did not see the profound changes that would occur in the Soviet Union after Gorbachev rose to power." To confront the Soviet Union's serious economic problems, Gorbachev implemented bold new policies for economic liberalisation and openness called glasnost and perestroika.

=== End of Cold War ===
Speaking in front of the Berlin Wall at the Brandenburg Gate in West Berlin on June 12, 1987, Reagan challenged reformist Soviet leader Mikhail Gorbachev to "Tear down this wall!"; the famed passage begins at 11:10 into this video.

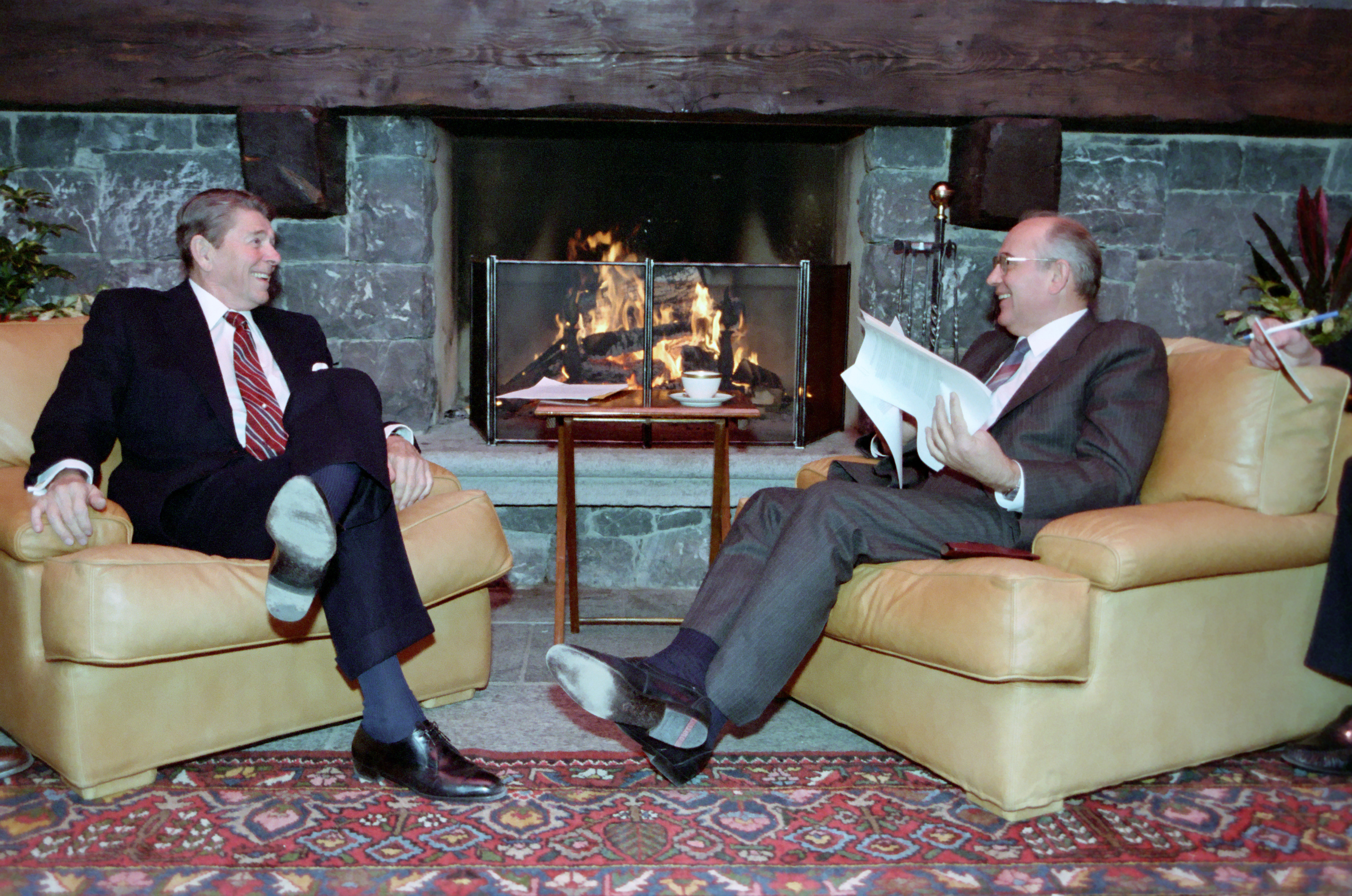
Reagan and Gorbachev built a relatively close relationship that was helpful in ensuring a peaceful end of the Cold War

Reagan relaxed his aggressive rhetoric toward the Soviet Union after Gorbachev became General Secretary of the Soviet Politburo in 1985, and took on a position of negotiating. In turn, the Soviets reversed their hostile view of Reagan and began negotiating in earnest. The Soviet Union was in deep economic trouble, and could no longer afford an increasingly expensive Cold War. The military consumed as much as 25% of the Soviet Union's gross national product at the expense of consumer goods and investment in civilian sectors. But the size of the Soviet Armed Forces was not necessarily the result of a simple action-reaction arms race with the United States. Instead, Soviet spending on the arms race and other Cold War commitments can be understood as both a cause and effect of the deep-seated structural problems in the Soviet system, which accumulated at least a decade of economic stagnation during the Brezhnev years. Soviet investment in the defense sector was not necessarily driven by military necessity, but in large part by the interests of massive party and state bureaucracies dependent on the sector for their own power and privileges.

By the time Mikhail Gorbachev had ascended to power in 1985, the Soviets suffered from an economic growth rate close to zero percent, combined with a sharp fall in hard currency earnings as a result of the downward slide in world oil prices in the 1980s; petroleum exports made up around 60 percent of the Soviet Union's total export earnings. To restructure the Soviet economy before it collapsed, Gorbachev announced an agenda of rapid reform, based upon what he called perestroika, meaning "restructuring", and glasnost, meaning "liberalization" and "openness". Reform required Gorbachev to redirect the country's resources from costly Cold War military commitments to more profitable areas in the civilian sector. As a result, Gorbachev offered major concessions to the United States on the levels of conventional forces, nuclear weapons, and policy in Eastern Europe.

Many U.S.-based Sovietologists and administration officials doubted that Gorbachev was serious about winding down the arms race, but Reagan recognized the real change in the direction of the Soviet leadership, and shifted to skillful diplomacy to personally push Gorbachev further with his reforms.

Reagan sincerely believed that if he could persuade the Soviets to simply look at the prosperous American economy, they too would embrace free markets and a free society.

At a speech given at the Berlin Wall on the city's 750th birthday, Reagan pushed Gorbachev further in front of 20,000 onlookers: "General Secretary Gorbachev, if you seek peace, if you seek prosperity for the Soviet Union and Eastern Europe, if you seek liberalization: Come here to this gate! Mr. Gorbachev, open this gate! Mr. Gorbachev, tear down this wall!" The last sentence became "the four most famous words of Ronald Reagan's Presidency". Reagan later said that the "forceful tone" of his speech was influenced by hearing before his speech that those on the East side of the wall attempting to hear him had been kept away by police. The Soviet news agency wrote that Reagan's visit was "openly provocative, war-mongering".

The east–west tensions that had reached intense new heights earlier in the decade rapidly subsided through the mid-to-late 1980s. In 1988, the Soviets officially declared that they would no longer intervene in the affairs of allied states in Eastern Europe. In 1989, Soviet forces withdrew from Afghanistan.

Reagan's Secretary of State George P. Shultz, a former economics professor, privately instructed Gorbachev on free market economics. At Gorbachev's request, Reagan gave a speech on free markets at Moscow University.

When Reagan visited Moscow, he was viewed as a celebrity by the Soviets. A journalist asked the president if he still considered the Soviet Union the evil empire. "No", he replied, "I was talking about another time, another era."

In his autobiography An American Life, Reagan expressed his optimism about the new direction they charted, his warm feelings for Gorbachev, and his concern for Gorbachev's safety because Gorbachev pushed reforms so hard. "I was concerned for his safety", Reagan wrote. "I've still worried about him. How hard and fast can he push reforms without risking his life?" Events would unravel far beyond what Gorbachev originally intended.

=== Soviet Union's collapse ===
According to David Remnick in his book Lenin's Tomb: The Last Days of the Soviet Empire, Gorbachev's perestroika and glasnost reforms opened the Pandora's box of freedom. Once the people benefited from the reforms, they wanted more. "Once the regime eased up enough to permit a full-scale examination of the Soviet past", Remnick wrote, "radical change was inevitable. Once the System showed itself for what it was and had been, it was doomed."

In December 1989, Gorbachev and George H. W. Bush declared the Cold War officially over at a summit meeting in Malta. The Soviet alliance system was by then on the brink of collapse, and the Communist regimes of the Warsaw Pact were losing power. On March 11, 1990 Lithuania, led by newly elected Vytautas Landsbergis, declared independence from the Soviet Union. The gate to the Berlin Wall was opened and Gorbachev approved. Gorbachev proposed to President George H. W. Bush massive troop reductions in Eastern Europe. In the USSR itself, Gorbachev tried to reform the party to destroy resistance to his reforms, but, in doing so, ultimately weakened the bonds that held the state and union together. By February 1990, the Communist Party was forced to surrender its 73-year-old monopoly on state power. Soviet hardliners rebelled and staged a coup against Gorbachev, but it failed. Boris Yeltsin rallied Russians in the street while Gorbachev was held hostage. By December 1991, the union-state had dissolved, breaking the USSR up into fifteen separate independent states. Boris Yeltsin became leader of the new Russia.

In her eulogy to Ronald Reagan at his funeral, former British Prime Minister Margaret Thatcher, whom Reagan worked very closely with during his tenure in office, said, "Others hoped, at best, for an uneasy cohabitation with the Soviet Union; he won the Cold War — not only without firing a shot, but also by inviting enemies out of their fortress and turning them into friends. ... Yes, he did not shrink from denouncing Moscow's 'evil empire.' But he realized that a man of goodwill might nonetheless emerge from within its dark corridors. So the President resisted Soviet expansion and pressed down on Soviet weakness at every point until the day came when communism began to collapse beneath the combined weight of these pressures and its own failures. And when a man of goodwill did emerge from the ruins, President Reagan stepped forward to shake his hand and to offer sincere cooperation."

For his role, Gorbachev received the first Ronald Reagan Freedom Award, as well as the Nobel Peace Prize.

== Asia ==
=== China ===
Reagan had been a prominent spokesman on behalf of Taiwan in the political arena, but his advisors convinced him to announce in his 1980 campaign that he would continue the opening to China. Haig argued strenuously that the People's Republic of China could be a major ally against the Soviet Union. Beijing refused to accept any two-China policy but agreed to postpone any showdown. As President, Reagan issued the "Six Assurances" to Taiwan and a joint communique with the PRC reaffirming the one-China policy. As the Cold War wound down during Reagan's second term, and Shultz replaced Haig, the need for China as an ally faded away. Shultz focused much more on economic trade with Japan. Beijing warmly welcomed the president when he visited in 1984.

In commercial space travel, Reagan backed a plan which allowed American satellites to be exported and launched on China's Long March rockets. This was criticized by Bill Nelson, then a Florida representative, as delaying U.S.'s own commercial space development, while industry leaders criticized the idea of a nation-state competing with private entities in the rocketry market. The China satellite export deal continued through Bush and Clinton administrations.

=== Japan ===
Trade issues with Japan dominated relationships, especially the threat that American automobile and high tech industries would be overwhelmed. After 1945, the U.S. produced about 75 percent of world's auto production. In 1980, the U.S. was overtaken by Japan and then became world's leader again in 1994. In 2006, Japan narrowly passed the U.S. in production and held this rank until 2009, when China took the top spot with 13.8 million units. Japan's economic miracle emerged from a systematic program of subsidized investment in strategic industries—steel, machinery, electronics, chemicals, autos, shipbuilding, and aircraft. During Reagan's first term, Japanese government and private investors owned a third of the debt sold by the US Treasury, providing Americans with hard currency used to buy Japanese goods. In March 1985 the Senate voted 92–0 in favor of a Republican resolution that condemned Japan's trade practices as "unfair" and called on President Reagan to curb Japanese imports. In 1981, Japanese automakers entered into the "voluntary export restraint" limiting the number of autos that they could export to the U.S. to 1.68 million per year.

Although the main current of the Reagan administration was anti-communism, Michael J. Heale argued that popular fears of Japan amounted to another "Yellow Peril". By 1990, Japan had eclipsed the Soviet Union as "the greatest perceived threat" in opinion polls.

=== Pakistan and India ===
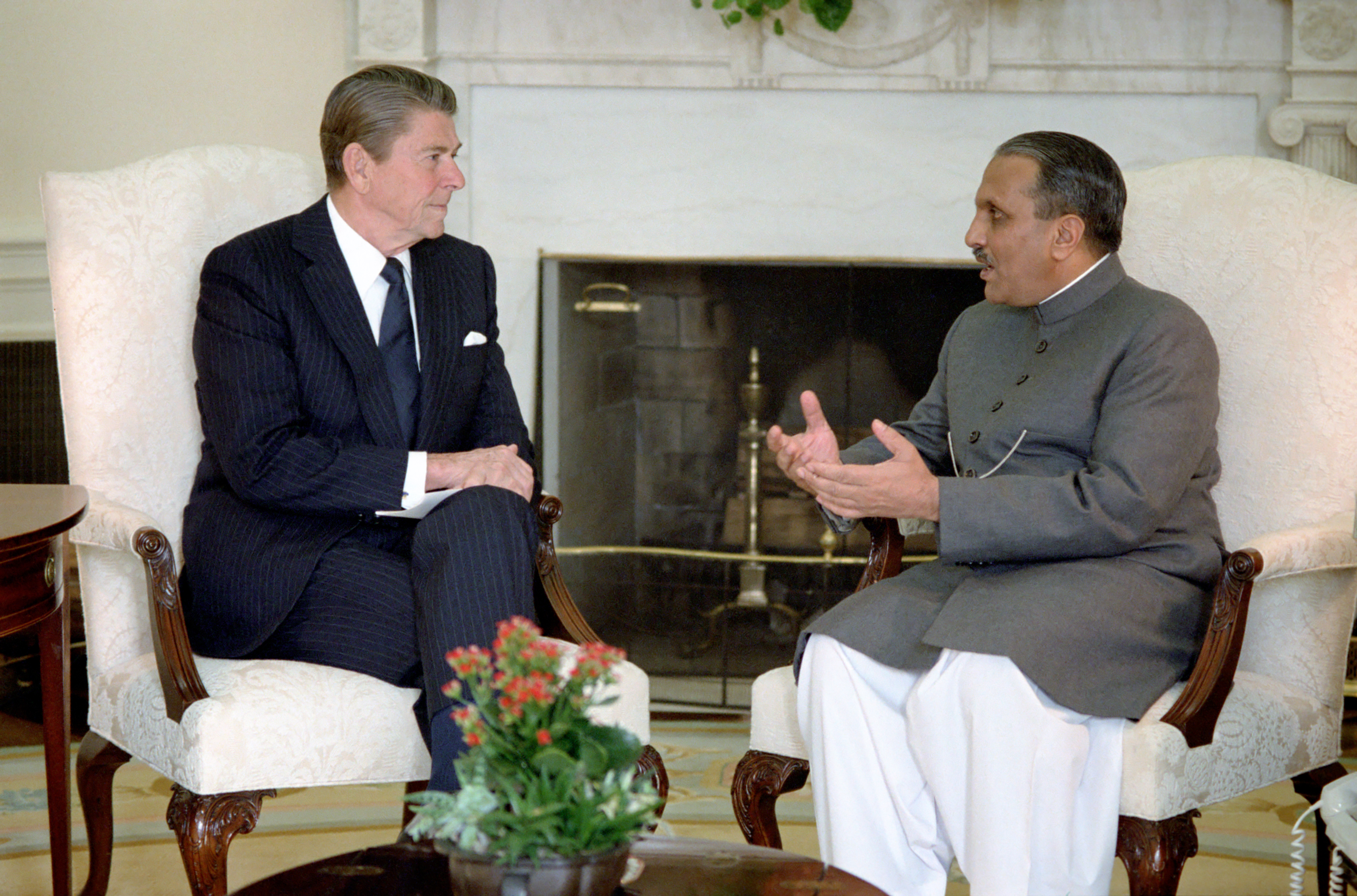
Reagan and Pakistan president Muhammad Zia-ul-Haq in the Oval Office in December 1982

Although Pakistan was ruled by Muhammad Zia-ul-Haq and his military dictatorship (1978–1988), it was an important ally against Soviet efforts to take control of Afghanistan. Reagan's new priorities enabled the effective effort by Congressman Charles Wilson (D-TX), aided by Joanne Herring, and CIA Afghan Desk Chief Gust Avrakotos to increase the funding for Operation Cyclone. Congress passed a six-year $3.2 billion programme of economic and military assistance, plus secret to the Afghan resistance sent through Pakistan. American officials visited the country on a routine basis, bolstering the Zia regime and weakening Pakistan's liberals, socialists, communists, and democracy advocates. General Akhtar Abdur Rahman of ISI and William Casey of CIA worked together in harmony, and in an atmosphere of mutual trust. Reagan sold Pakistan attack helicopters, self-propelled howitzers, armoured personnel carriers, 40 F-16 Fighting Falcon warplanes, nuclear technology, naval warships, and intelligence equipment and training.

Indira Gandhi returned to power in India in 1980 and relations were slow to improve. India gave tacit support to the USSR in the Soviet invasion and occupation of Afghanistan. New Delhi sounded out Washington on the purchase of a range of American defence technology, including F-5 aircraft, super computers, night vision goggles and radars. In 1984 Washington approved the supply of selected technology to India including gas turbines for naval frigates and engines for prototypes for India's light combat aircraft. There were also unpublicised transfers of technology, including the engagement of an American company, Continental Electronics, to design and build a new VLF communications station at Tirunelveli, Tamil Nadu. However, by the late 1980s there was a significant effort by both countries to improve relations.

=== Afghanistan ===
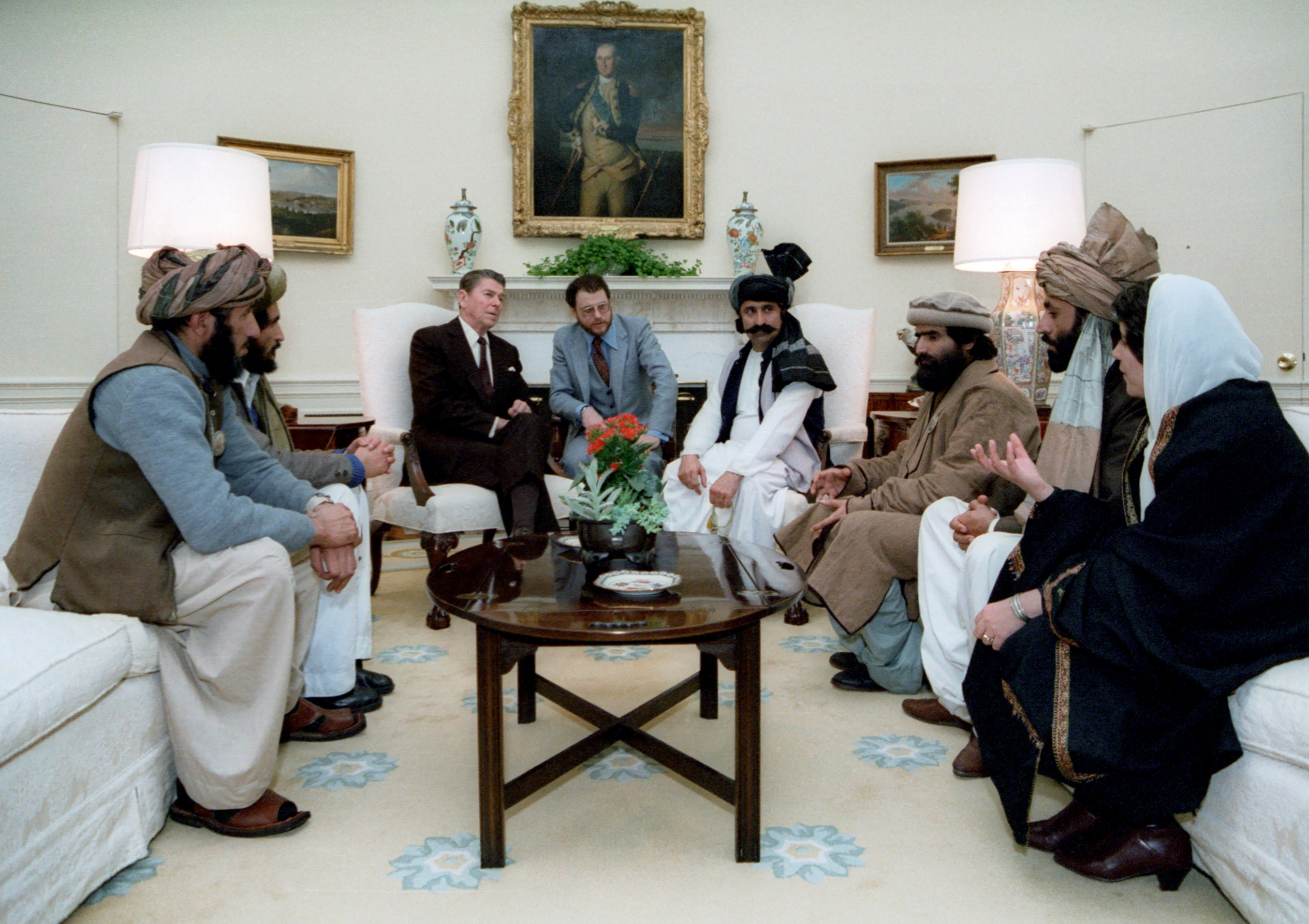
Reagan meeting with Afghan Mujahideen leaders in the Oval Office in February 1983

To watch the courageous Afghan freedom fighters battle modern arsenals with simple hand-held weapons is an inspiration to those who love freedom.

— U.S. President Ronald Reagan, March 21, 1983

Upon becoming president, Reagan moved quickly to undermine Soviet efforts to support the government of Afghanistan, as the Soviet Army had entered that country at Kabul's request in 1979.

Islamic mujahideen guerrillas were covertly supported and trained, and backed in their jihad against the occupying Soviets by the CIA. The agency sent billions of dollars in military aid to the guerrillas, in what came to be known as "Charlie Wilson's War".

One of the CIA's longest and most expensive covert operations was the supplying of billions of dollars in arms to the Afghan mujahideen militants. The CIA provided assistance to the fundamentalist insurgents through the Pakistani ISI in a program called Operation Cyclone. Somewhere between $2–$20 billion in U.S. funds were funneled into the country to equip troops with weapons.

With U.S. and other funding, the ISI armed and trained over 100,000 insurgents. On July 20, 1987, the withdrawal of Soviet troops from the country was announced pursuant to the negotiations that led to the Geneva Accords of 1988, with the last Soviets leaving on February 15, 1989.

The early foundations of al-Qaeda were allegedly built in part on relationships and weaponry that came from the billions of dollars in U.S. support for the Afghan mujahideen during the war to expel Soviet forces from that country. However, these allegations are rejected by Steve Coll ("If the CIA did have contact with bin Laden during the 1980s and subsequently covered it up, it has so far done an excellent job"), Peter Bergen ("The theory that bin Laden was created by the CIA is invariably advanced as an axiom with no supporting evidence"), and Jason Burke ("It is often said that bin Laden was funded by the CIA. This is not true, and, indeed, would have been impossible given the structure of funding that General Zia ul–Haq, who had taken power in Pakistan in 1977, had set up").

=== Cambodia ===
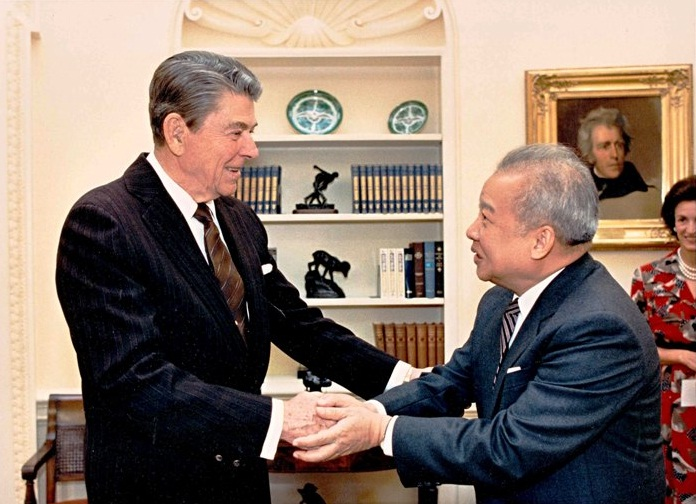
Reagan with Prince Norodom Sihanouk of Cambodia in the Oval Office October 1988

Reagan sought to apply the Reagan Doctrine of aiding anti-Soviet resistance movements abroad to Cambodia, which was under Vietnamese occupation after having ousted Pol Pot's communist Khmer Rouge regime which had perpetrated the Cambodian genocide. The Vietnamese had installed the communist PRK government led by Salvation Front dissident Heng Samrin. The largest resistance movement fighting the PRK government was largely made up of members of the China-backed former Khmer Rouge regime, whose human rights record was among the worst of the 20th century.

Therefore, Reagan authorized the covert provision of aid to smaller Cambodian resistance movements, referred to collectively as the "non-communist resistance" (NCR) and including the partisans of Norodom Sihanouk and a coalition called the Khmer People's National Liberation Front (KPNLF) then run by Son Sann, in an effort to force an end to the Vietnamese occupation. In 1982, covert aid amounted to $5 million per year, ostensibly for non-lethal aid only; this amount was increased to $8 million in 1984 and $12 million in 1987 and 1988. In late 1988, Reagan decreased CIA-mediated funding to $8 million (following reports that the Thai military had diverted $3.5 million), but at the same time gave new flexibility to the funds, permitting the NCR to purchase U.S.-made weapons in Singapore and other ASEAN markets. Meanwhile, in 1985, the Reagan administration established a separate, overt aid program for the NCR known as the Solarz Fund. The overt Solarz Fund channeled about $5 million per year of humanitarian aid to the NCR through USAID.

After the fall of communism in 1989, Vietnam lost Russian help. Vietnam withdrew, and Cambodia's PRK government was forced to negotiate for peace, resulting in the 1991 Paris Agreements. Then, under United Nations supervision, free elections were held in 1993.

=== Indonesia and East Timor ===
Headed by General Suharto, Indonesia invaded East Timor in 1975 and occupied the country until 1999. Under Reagan, the U.S. continued military aid provision to the Suharto regime, a policy established in 1975 under Ford and continued by the Carter administration. In December 1983, a letter signed by 122 members of Congress addressed to President Reagan was publicized. The letter noted "persistent reports from Amnesty International and other organizations of human rights violations" and asked the president "to add the plight of the people of East Timor to [his] agenda." Uncompromising, Reagan continued the arms trade to the Suharto regime.

The Reagan administration's average in yearly arms sales to Jakarta for his first term was $40 million. In 1986, the president approved an unprecedented sale of $300 million, though yearly sales were significantly lower in his term's remainder. The policy of arms trade to Indonesia resumed under Bush and Clinton, and completely ended after the UN-sponsored 1999 East Timorese independence referendum.

=== Philippines ===
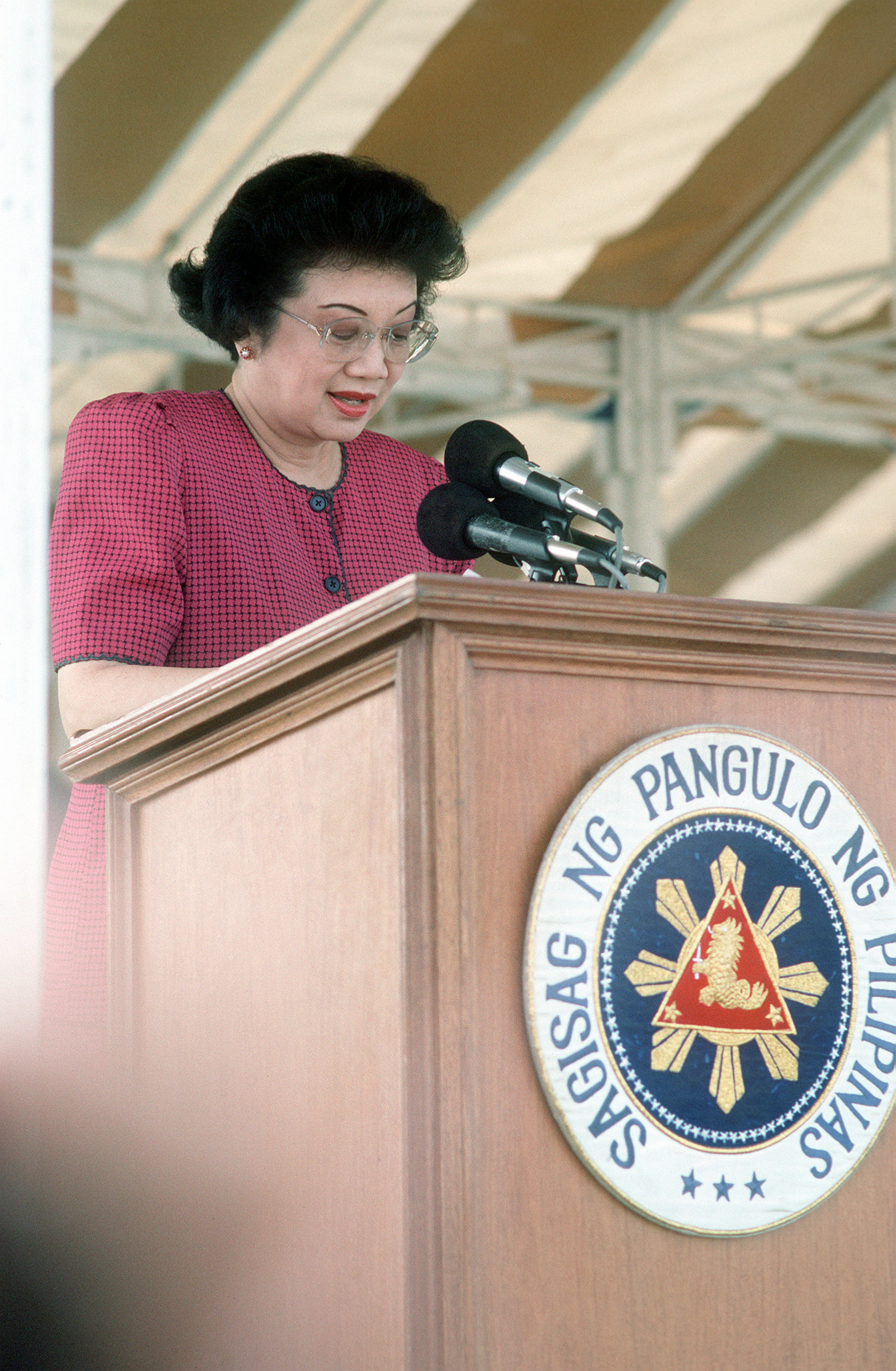
Corazon Aquino, president of the Philippines from 1986 to 1992

The primary U.S. interest in the Philippines was its military bases (e.g. Clark Air Base, Subic Bay Naval Base, etc.) whose land was leased from the Philippine government. The bases' geostrategic importance came from being situated close to the international sea lanes connecting the Persian Gulf, Southeast Asia, and Northeast Asia.

The Reagan administration repeatedly stood by Filipino dictator Ferdinand Marcos. From the declaration of martial law in 1972 until 1983 the U.S. government backed the Marcos regime with $2.5 billion in bilateral military and economic aid and about $5.5 billion through multilateral institutions such as the World Bank. As early as 1973, U.S. officials were aware that Philippine government agents were in the U.S. to harass Filipino dissidents. In June 1981, two anti-Marcos labor activists were assassinated outside of a union hall in Seattle. That same month, Vice President George H. W. Bush praised Marcos for his "adherence to democratic principles and to the democratic processes" after he won the 1981 election. (Note: There is some disagreement between sources about whether President Bush said principle or principles.)

Reagan's support did not waiver, despite the uproar over Marcos' assassination of his chief political rival, Sen. Benigno Aquino Jr. on August 21, 1983. After a Marcos-appointed board of inquiry, called the Agrava Board, blamed the murder on a plot among Aquinos' military bodyguards, the Marcos-appointed Sandiganbayan court acquitted the 25 accused military personnel on December 2, 1985. Despite continued charges that the Marcos regime was corrupt and repressive, Reagan continued to stress the close links that existed between the Philippines and the U.S.

In February 1986, Aquino's widow, Corazon Aquino, ran for president against Marcos. The U.S. and UK sent official delegations to monitor the election. However, when U.S. observers reported widespread election fraud and violence on the part of the Marcos campaign, Reagan turned a blind eye and declared the U.S. neutral. One observer, Sen. Richard Lugar, reported that the Marcos government was trying to juggle the vote count. Lugar, along with Sen. Bob Dole and Sam Nunn, publicly protested the president's indifference. On February 22–25, thousands of citizens took to the streets in a series of demonstrations known as the People Power Revolution. In response, Filipino military and government leaders abandoned Marcos. The Reagan administration swiftly shifted to pressuring Marcos to step down so as to ensure the peaceful transition of power. Corazon Aquino's taking office as president marked the restoration of democracy in the country, and the U.S. recognized the Aquino government on Feb. 25. Still, Reagan's stubborn defense of Marcos strained relations.

This came into play during negotiations to renew the U.S. leases on its Philippine bases. The U.S. had to make concessions and promise substantial increases in economic and military aid before the Aquino government would renew the lease agreements. In September 1991, however, resentment led to the Philippine Senate voting to terminate the leases.

== Western Europe and Poland ==
=== United Kingdom ===
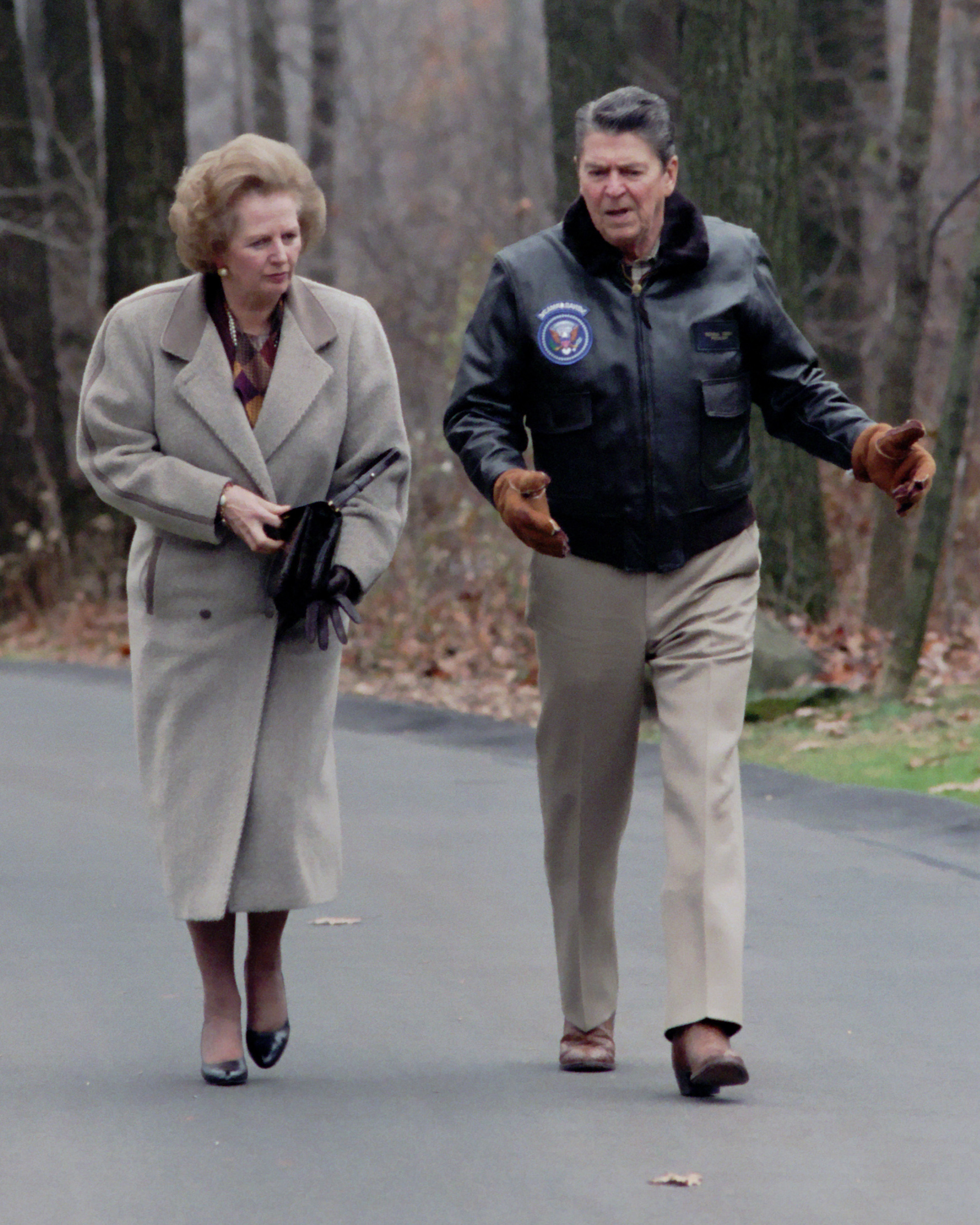
Reagan with British Prime Minister Margaret Thatcher at Camp David in November 1986

Reagan had close friendships with many political leaders across the globe, especially Margaret Thatcher in Britain, and Brian Mulroney in Canada. Despite opposite personalities, Reagan and Thatcher bonded quickly, argues David Cannadine:

In many ways they were very different figures: he was sunny, genial, charming, relaxed, upbeat, and with little intellectual curiosity or command of policy detail; she was domineering, belligerent, confrontational, tireless, hyperactive, and with an unrivalled command of facts and figures. But the chemistry between them worked. Reagan had been grateful for her interest in him at a time when the British establishment refused to take him seriously; she agreed with him about the importance of creating wealth, cutting taxes, and building up stronger defences against Soviet Russia; and both believed in liberty and free-market freedom, and in the need to outface what Reagan would later call 'the evil empire'.

=== Holy See ===
The United States maintained consular relations with the Papal States from 1797 to 1870 and diplomatic relations with the Pope, in his capacity as head of the Papal States, from 1848 to 1868, though not at the ambassadorial level. These relations lapsed with the loss of all papal territories in 1870.

From 1870 to 1984, the United States did not have diplomatic relations with the Holy See. Several presidents, however, designated personal envoys to visit Vatican City periodically for discussions of international humanitarian and political issues. Myron C. Taylor was the first of these representatives, serving from 1939 to 1950. Presidents Nixon, Ford, Carter, and Reagan also appointed personal envoys to the Pope.

Despite long-standing opposition by Protestant denominations to diplomatic recognition of the Vatican, the U.S. and Vatican City announced the establishment of diplomatic relations on January 10, 1984. On March 7, 1984, the Senate confirmed William A. Wilson as the first U.S. ambassador to the Vatican. Ambassador Wilson had been President Reagan's personal envoy to the Pope since 1981. The Holy See named Archbishop Pio Laghi as the Vatican's first Apostolic Nuncio (equivalent to ambassador) to the U.S. A coalition of Protestant groups responded by filing a lawsuit to nullify this diplomatic relationship, claiming it violated the separation of church and state.

=== Poland ===
The U.S. supported the Solidarity movement in Poland, led by Lech Wałęsa. In power was the Communist Prime Minister Wojciech Jaruzelski, who tried to keep control without Soviet intervention. He launched a crackdown in 1981. Washington protested but had little leverage. In response to Jaruzelski's October 1982 ban on labor organizations, Reagan imposed economic sanctions and major European nations eventually did the same. Martial law ended in July 1983. Using the CIA project codenamed QRHELPFUL, the Reagan administration funded and supported Solidarity and cooperated with the Pope in mobilizing anti-Communist forces in Poland.

== Middle East ==
=== Iran–Iraq War ===
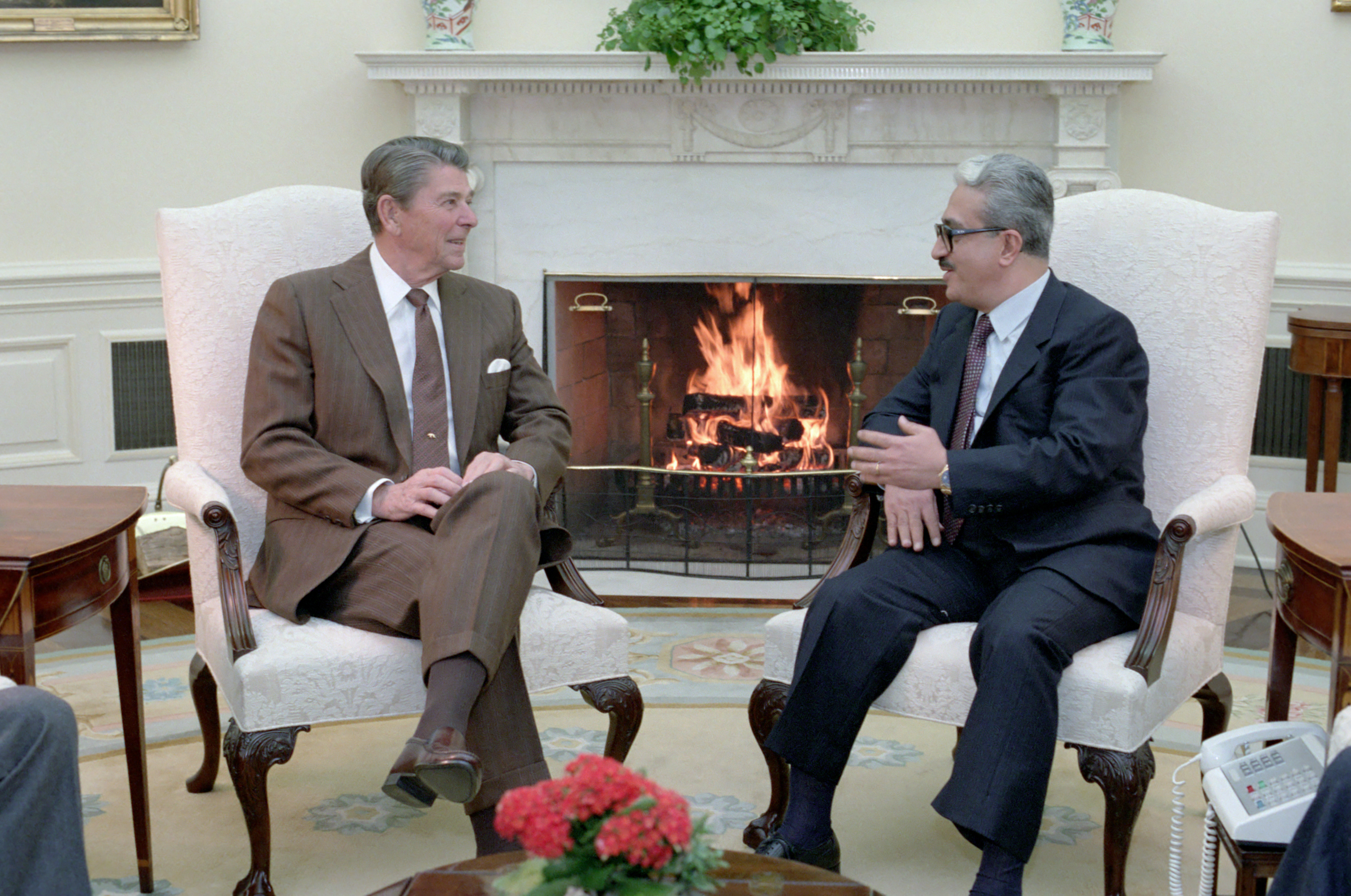
Reagan hosts Saddam Hussein's foreign minister Tariq Aziz of Iraq at the White House in November 1984

When the Iran–Iraq War broke out following the Iranian Islamic revolution of 1979, the United States initially remained neutral in the conflict. However, as the war intensified, the Reagan administration would covertly intervene to maintain a balance of power, supporting both nations at various times. The U.S. mainly sided with Iraq, believing that Iranian leader Ayatollah Khomeini threatened regional stability more than Iraqi President Saddam Hussein. U.S. officials feared that an Iranian victory would embolden Islamic fundamentalists in the Arab states, perhaps leading to the overthrow of secular governments—and damage to Western corporate interests—in Saudi Arabia, Jordan, and Kuwait. After initial Iraqi Armed Forces victories were reversed and an Iranian victory appeared possible in 1982, the American government initiated Operation Staunch to attempt to cut off the Iranian regime's access to weapons (notwithstanding their later shipment of weapons to Iran in the Iran–Contra affair). The U.S. provided intelligence information and financial assistance to the Iraqi military regime.

On April 18, 1988, Reagan authorized Operation Praying Mantis, a one-day naval strike against Iranian naval ships, boats, and command posts in retaliation for the mining of a U.S. guided missile frigate. One day later, Reagan sent a letter to the Speaker of the House of Representatives and the President Pro Tempore of the Senate. USS Simpson (FFG-56) is mentioned in firing on Iranian F-4 Phantom II fighters built by the United States.

=== Israel ===
Israel was granted "major non-NATO ally" status in 1989, giving it access to expanded weapons systems and opportunities to bid on US defense contracts. The United States maintained grant aid to Israel at $3 billion annually and implemented a free trade agreement in 1985. Since then all customs duties between the two trading partners have been eliminated. Relations soured when Israel carried out Operation Opera, an Israeli airstrike on the Osirak nuclear reactor in Baghdad. Reagan suspended a shipment of military aircraft to Israel, and harshly criticized the action. Relations also soured during the 1982 Lebanon War, when the United States even contemplated sanctions to stop the Israeli Siege of Beirut. The US reminded Israel that weaponry provided by the US was to be used for defensive purposes only, and suspended shipments of cluster munitions to Israel. Although the war exposed some serious differences between Israeli and US policies (such as Israel's rejection of the Reagan peace plan of September 1, 1982), it did not alter the administration's favoritism for Israel and the emphasis it placed on Israel's importance to the United States. Although critical of Israeli actions, the United States vetoed a Soviet-proposed United Nations Security Council resolution to impose an arms embargo on Israel.

In 1985, the US supported Israel's economic stabilization through roughly $1.5 billion in two-year loan guarantees the creation of a US–Israel bilateral economic forum called the U.S.–Israel Joint Economic Development Group (JEDG).

The second Reagan term ended on what many Israelis considered to be a sour note when the United States opened a dialogue with the Palestine Liberation Organization (PLO) in December 1988. But, despite the US–PLO dialogue, the Pollard spy case, and the Israeli rejection of the Shultz peace initiative in the spring of 1988, pro-Israeli organizations in the United States characterized the Reagan administration (and the 100th Congress) as the "most pro-Israel ever", and praised the positive overall tone of bilateral relations.

=== Iran–Contra affair ===
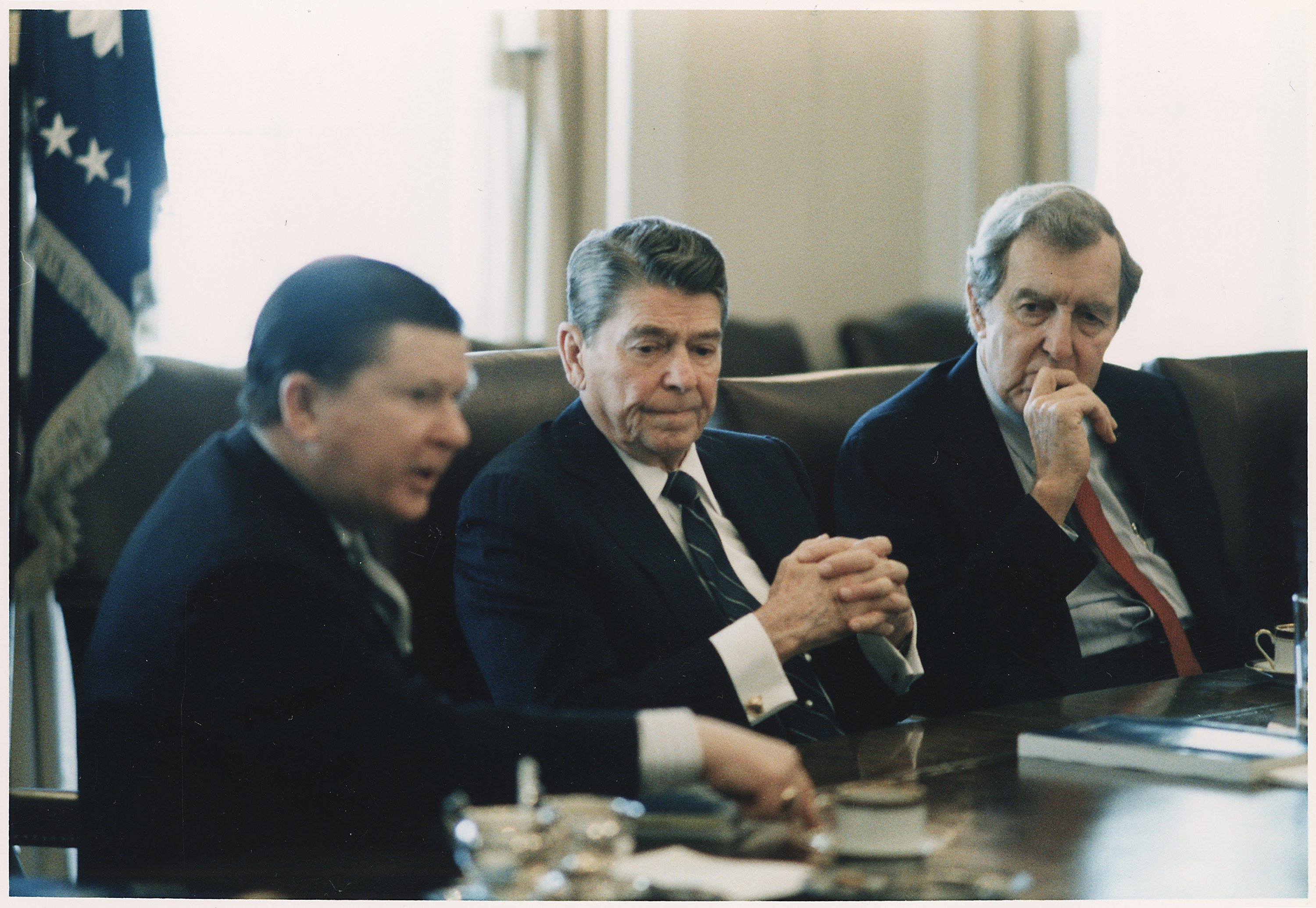
Reagan receives the Tower Commission report on the Iran-Contra affair in the Cabinet Room at the White House in February 1987

The attempts of certain members of the White House national security staff to circumvent Congressional proscription of covert military aid to the Contras ultimately resulted in the Iran-Contra Affair.

Two members of administration, National Security Advisor John Poindexter and Col. Oliver North worked through CIA and military channels to sell arms to the Iranian government and give the profits to the contra guerillas in Nicaragua, who were engaged in a bloody civil war. Both actions were contrary to acts of Congress. Reagan professed ignorance of the plot, but admitted that he had supported the initial sale of arms to Iran, on the grounds that such sales were supposed to help secure the release of Americans being held hostage by the Iranian-backed Hezbollah in Lebanon.

Reagan quickly called for the appointment of an Independent Counsel to investigate the wider scandal; the resulting Tower Commission report found that the President was guilty of the scandal, only in that his lax control of his own staff resulted in the arms sales. (The report also revealed that U.S. officials helped Khomeini identify and purge communists within the Iranian government.) The failure of these scandals to have a lasting impact on Reagan's reputation led Representative Patricia Schroeder to dub him the "Teflon President", a term that has been occasionally attached to later Presidents and their scandals. Ten officials in the Reagan administration were convicted, and others were forced to resign. Secretary of Defense Caspar Weinberger was indicted for perjury and later received a presidential pardon from George H.W. Bush, days before the trial was to begin. In 2006, historians ranked the Iran-Contra affair as the ninth-worst mistake by a U.S. president.

=== Lebanon ===
With the approval of Congress, Reagan in 1983 sent forces to Lebanon to reduce the threat of civil war. The American peacekeeping forces in Beirut, a part of a multinational force during the Lebanese Civil War, were attacked on October 23, 1983. The Beirut barracks bombing killed 241 American servicemen and wounded more than 60 others by a suicide truck bomber. Reagan sent in a battleship to shell Syrian positions in Lebanon. Shortly after the barracks bombing, Reagan appointed a military fact-finding committee headed by retired Admiral Robert L. J. Long to investigate the bombing. He then withdrew all the marines from Lebanon.

=== Libya ===
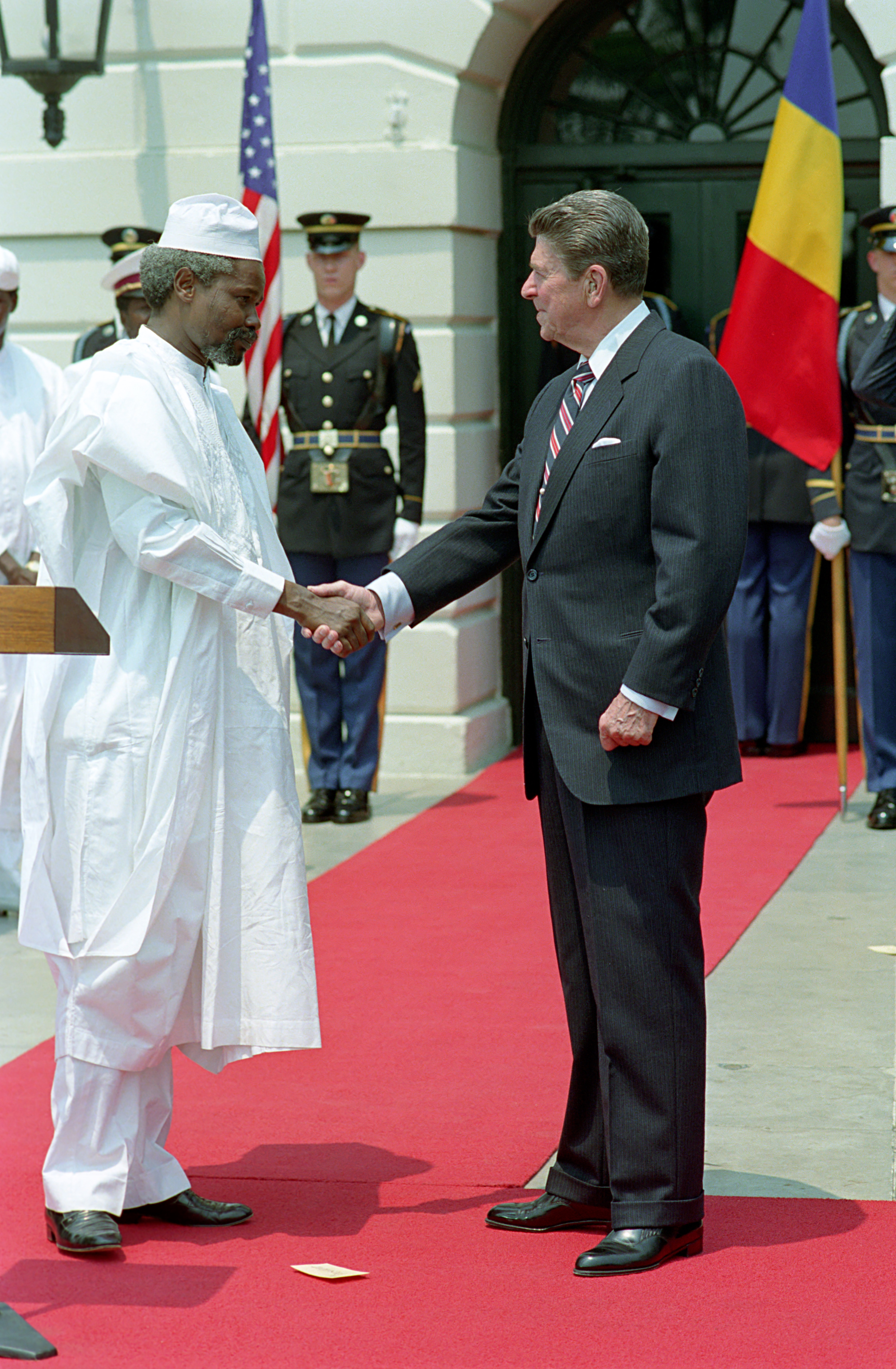
Hissène Habré, president of Chad, at the White House; Habré was supported by the Reagan administration as an ally against Muammar Gaddafi in Libya.

Relations between Libya and the U.S. under President Reagan were continually contentious, beginning with the Gulf of Sidra incident in 1981. Washington saw Libyan leader Muammar Gaddafi as a dangerous, erratic friend of the Soviets and kept Libya on the watch list. An August 1982, a CIA official revealed to Time magazine how the Reagan-led CIA regarded Gaddafi, whose photo was even put next to fellow "unholy trinity" members Soviet Union leader Leonid Brezhnev and Cuban leader Fidel Castro at various CIA offices, to be “the first among equals, our international public enemy No. 1."

Tensions exploded into military action in early April 1986, when a bomb exploded in a Berlin discothèque, resulting in the injury of 63 American military personnel and death of one serviceman. Stating that there was "irrefutable proof" that Libya had directed the "terrorist bombing", Reagan authorized a series of air strikes on ground targets in Libya on April 15. British Prime Minister Margaret Thatcher allowed the US Air Force to use Britain's air bases to launch the attack, on the justification that the UK was supporting America's right to self-defense under Article 51 of the United Nations Charter. Reagan told a national audience, "When our citizens are attacked or abused anywhere in the world on the direct orders of hostile regimes, we will respond so long as I'm in this office." The attack was designed to halt Gaddafi's "ability to export terrorism", offering him "incentives and reasons to alter his criminal behavior".

The UN Security Council rejected criticism of the U.S. However, by a vote of 79 in favor to 28 against with 33 abstentions, the United Nations General Assembly adopted resolution 41/38 which "condemns the military attack perpetrated against the Socialist People's Libyan Arab Jamahiriya on 15 April 1986, which constitutes a violation of the Charter of the United Nations and of international law."

=== Saudi Arabia ===
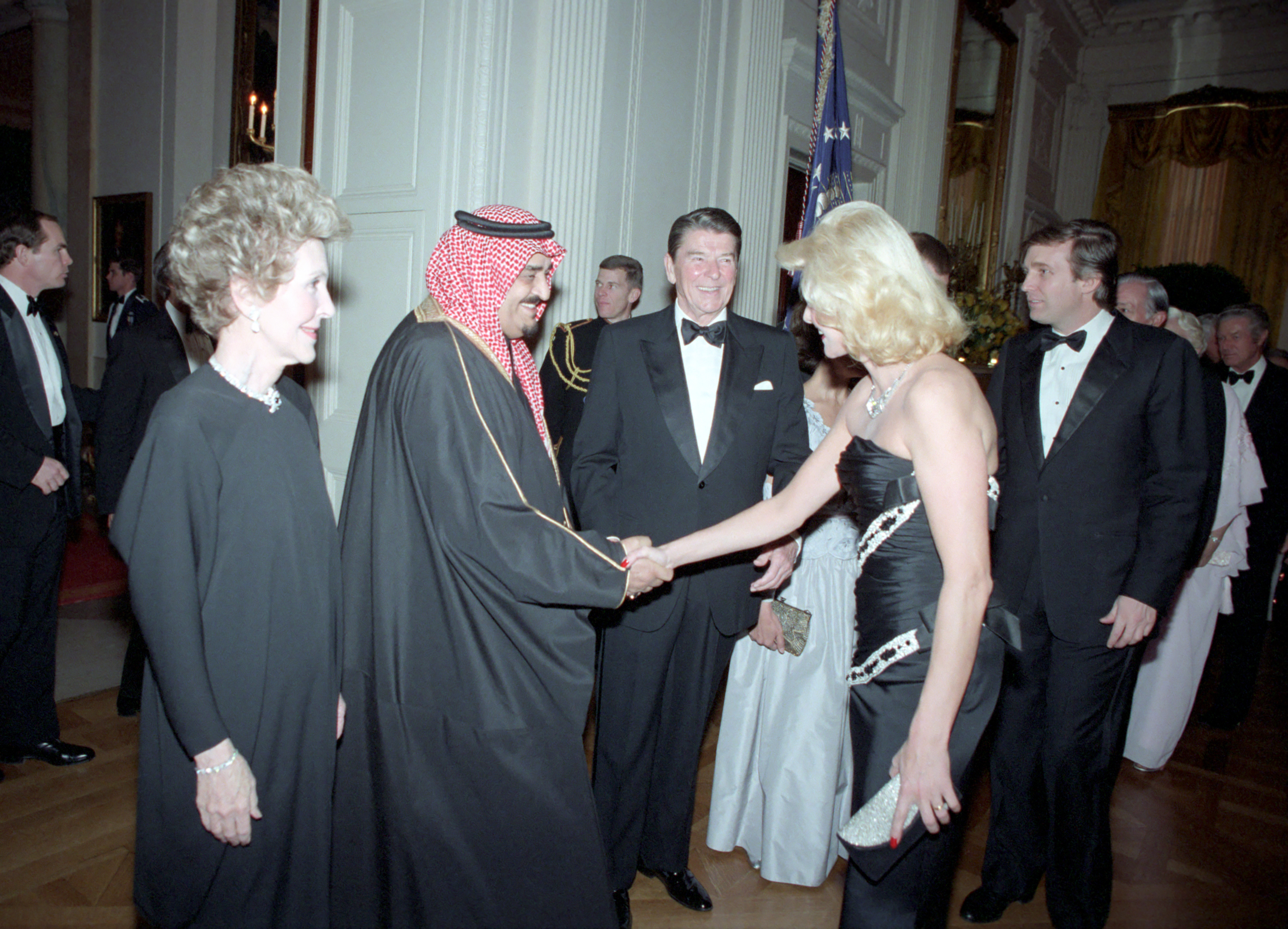
Reagan with Fahd, the King of Saudi Arabia, at the White House in February 1985

The Reagan administration strengthened the alliance with Saudi Arabia as it kept the commitment to defend the Kingdom. The "special relationship" between Riyadh and Washington really began to flourish after 1981, as the Saudis turned to the Reagan administration to safeguard their orders of advanced weapons. Saudi Arabia was part of the Reagan Doctrine. Secretary of Defense, Caspar Weinberger was previously affiliated with construction giant Bechtel, which had major interests in Saudi Arabia.

After only two weeks in office, Weinberger announced that the administration wanted to do everything it could to strengthen Saudi defenses in the wake of the fall of the Shah in Iran. On March 6, 1981, the administration announced plans to sell new arms to the Saudis to halt what it perceived to be a "serious deterioration" in Western security interests in the region. On April 1, the National Security Council (NSC) decided to expand the administration's initial arms package to include five AWACS surveillance planes, the most advanced of their kind in the world. The total Saudi purchase, including the AWACS, came to $8.5 billion. Reagan vowed to push the sale through, declaring that Saudi Arabia must not be allowed to fall like Iran and that the United States would forfeit "all credibility" in the Middle East if Congress blocked the sale. Finally, after extraordinary arm-twisting by President Reagan, the Senate approved the deal in late October.

Reagan proposed a 300 million sale of weapons to the Saudis. Facing this proposal, the Senate voted 73-22 to reject Reagan's proposed arms sale. The House followed shortly after on a 356-to-62 vote. On May 22, 1986, Reagan vetoed. On June 5, 1986, The Senate failed by one vote to override Reagan's veto.

== Americas ==
Through his terms Reagan supported the anti-communist regimes of Guatemala and El Salvador and the Contra rebels in Nicaragua, as well as democratic transitions of power in Bolivia (1982), Honduras (1981), Argentina (1983), Brazil (1985), Uruguay (1984), and Suriname (1987). His support for the contras in Nicaragua was controversial, due to the poor human rights record of the rebels. Support for the governments of Guatemala and El Salvador was also controversial due to the repressive nature of those governments and what was later determined to be genocide in Guatemala.

In the case of the Falklands War in 1982, the Reagan administration faced competing obligations to both sides, bound to the United Kingdom as a member of the North Atlantic Treaty Organization (NATO) and to Argentina by the Inter-American Treaty of Reciprocal Assistance (the "Rio Pact"). However, the North Atlantic Treaty only obliges the signatories to support each other if an attack occurred in Europe or North America north of the Tropic of Cancer, and the Rio Pact only obliges the U.S. to intervene if the territory of one of the signatories was attacked—the UK never attacked Argentine territory. As the conflict developed, the Reagan administration tilted its support towards Britain.

=== Nicaragua ===
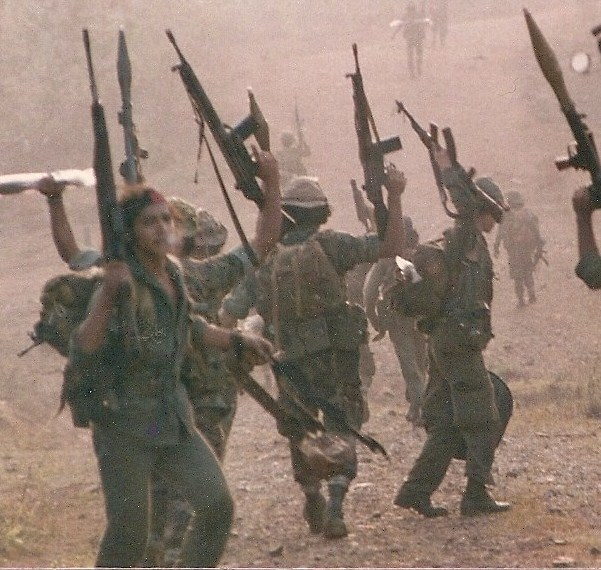
The U.S.-supported Nicaraguan contras, key beneficiaries of the Reagan Doctrine, in 1987

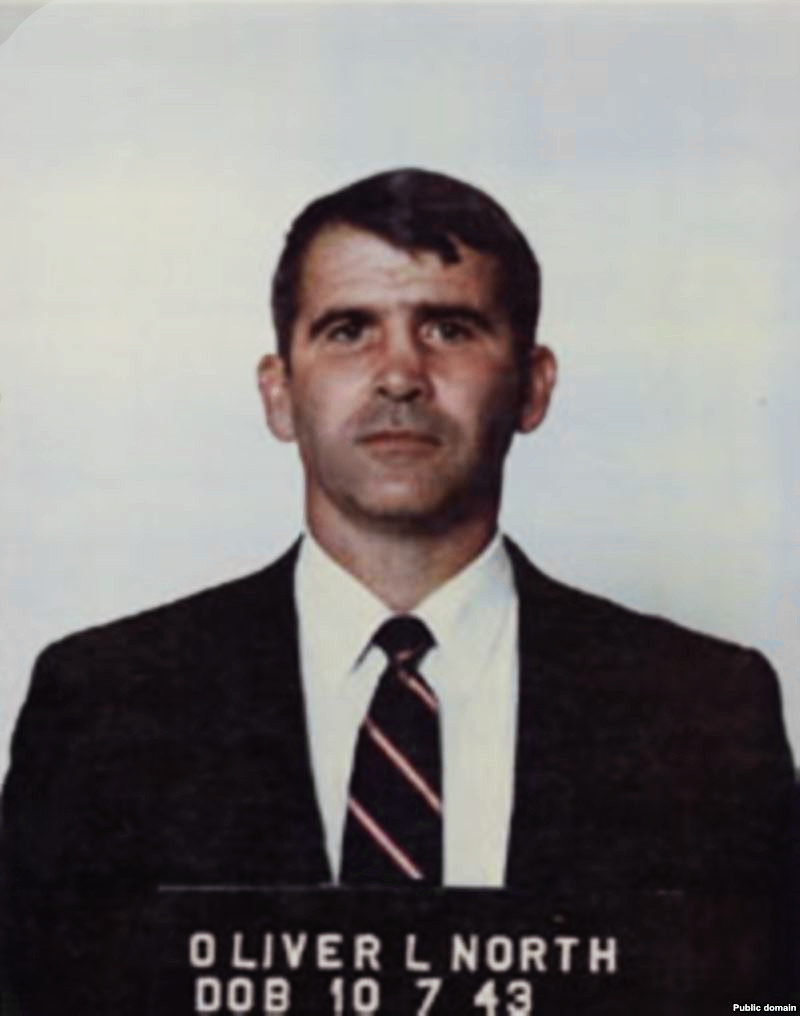
Oliver North's mugshot taken after his arrest

Undermining the hostile regime in Nicaragua was a high priority for Reagan. He described Nicaragua under the Sandinista National Liberation Front as "a Soviet ally on the American mainland". In a public address in March 1986, Reagan stated that "Using Nicaragua as a base, the Soviets and Cubans can become the dominant power in the crucial corridor between North and South America."

The Reagan administration lent logistical, financial, and military support to the Contras, based in neighboring Honduras, who waged a guerrilla insurgency in an effort to topple the Sandinista government of Nicaragua (which was headed by Daniel Ortega). This support was funneled through the CIA to the rebels, and continued right through Reagan's period in office. The scorched earth tactics of the Contras were condemned for their brutality by several historians.

In 1983, the CIA created a group of "Unilaterally Controlled Latino Assets" (UCLAs), whose task was to "sabotage ports, refineries, boats and bridges, and try to make it look like the contras had done it." In January 1984, these UCLA's carried out the operation for which they would be best known; the mining of several Nicaraguan harbors, which sank several Nicaraguan boats and damaged at least five foreign vessels. This incident led to the ratification of the Boland Amendment by the US Congress, and brought an avalanche of international condemnation down on the United States. The CIA also provided training and arms, as well as funding, directly to the Contras.

In response to the insurgency, the regime passed a new law, the "Law for the Maintenance of Order and Public Security", under which the "Tribunales Populares Anti-Somozistas" allowed for the holding of suspected counter-revolutionaries without trial. The State of Emergency most notably affected rights and guarantees contained in the "Statute on Rights and Guarantees of Nicaraguans". Many civil liberties were curtailed or canceled such as the freedom to organize demonstrations, the inviolability of the home, freedom of the press, freedom of speech and, the freedom to strike.

The Boland Amendment made it illegal under U.S. law to provide arms to the contra militants. Nevertheless, the Reagan administration continued to arm and fund the contras through the Iran-Contra scandal, pursuant to which the U.S. secretly sold arms to Iran in violation of U.S. law in exchange for cash used by the U.S. to supply arms to the contras, also in violation of law. The U.S. argued that:

Nicaragua's neighbors have asked for assistance against Nicaraguan aggression, and the United States has responded. Those countries have repeatedly and publicly made clear that they consider themselves to be the victims of aggression from Nicaragua, and that they desire United States assistance in meeting both subversive attacks and the conventional threat posed by the relatively immense Nicaraguan Armed Forces.

The Sandinista government won victory in the 1984 Nicaraguan elections. The elections had been declared "free, fair, and hotly contested" by election observers such as New York's Human Rights Commission. However, the elections were conducted under the SOE. Political prisoners were still held as it took place, and several opposition parties refused to participate.

In addition, the Reagan administration criticized the elections because Arturo Cruz, the candidate nominated by the Coordinadora Democrática Nicaragüense, refused to run. However, the U.S. reportedly urged Cruz to avoid participation. Several senior administration officials told The New York Times that "the administration never contemplated letting Cruz stay in the race because then the Sandinistas could justifiably claim that the elections were legitimate".

The U.S. continued to pressure the government by illegally arming the contra insurgency. On October 5, 1985, the Sandinistas broadened the state of emergency begun in 1982 and suspended many more civil rights. A new regulation also forced any organization outside of the government to first submit any statement it wanted to make public to the censorship bureau for prior censorship.

It has been argued that "probably a key factor in preventing the 1984 elections from establishing liberal democratic rule was the United States' policy toward Nicaragua." Others have disputed this view, claiming that "the Sandinistas' decision to hold elections in 1984 was largely of foreign inspiration".

As the contras' insurgency continued with U.S. support, the Sandinistas struggled to maintain power. They lost power in 1990, when they ended the SOE and held an election that all the main opposition parties competed in. The Sandinistas have been accused of killing thousands by Nicaragua's Permanent Commission on Human Rights. The contras have also been accused of committing war crimes, such as rape, arson, and the killing of civilians.

Historian Greg Grandin described a disjuncture between official ideals preached by the U.S. and actual U.S. support for terrorism.

Nicaragua, where the United States backed not a counter insurgent state but anti-communist mercenaries, likewise represented a disjuncture between the idealism used to justify U.S. policy and its support for political terrorism ... The corollary to the idealism embraced by the Republicans in the realm of diplomatic public policy debate was thus political terror. In the dirtiest of Latin America's dirty wars, their faith in America's mission justified atrocities in the name of liberty.

Similarly, former diplomat Clara Nieto, in her book Masters of War, charged that "the CIA launched a series of terrorist actions from the "mothership" off Nicaragua's coast. In September 1983, she charged the agency attacked Puerto Sandino with rockets. The following month, frogmen blew up the underwater oil pipeline in the same port — the only one in the country. In October there was an attack on Pierto Corinto, Nicaragua's largest port, with mortars, rockets, and grenades blowing up five large oil and gasoline storage tanks. More than a hundred people were wounded, and the fierce fire, which could not be brought under control for two days, forced the evacuation of 23,000 people."

Supporters of the Reagan administration have pointed out that the US had been the largest provider of aid to Nicaragua, and twice offered to resume aid if the Sandinistas agreed to stop arming communist insurgents in El Salvador. Former official Roger Miranda wrote that "Washington could not ignore Sandinista attempts to overthrow Central American governments." Nicaragua's Permanent Commission on Human Rights condemned Sandinista human rights violations, recording at least 2,000 murders in the first six months and 3,000 disappearances in the first few years. It has since documented 14,000 cases of torture, rape, kidnapping, mutilation and murder. The Sandinistas admitted to forcing 180,000 peasants into resettlement camps.

In Nicaragua v. United States, the International Court of Justice (ICJ) held that the U.S. had violated international law by supporting the contras in their rebellion against the Nicaraguan government and by mining Nicaragua's harbors. The United States refused to participate in the proceedings after the Court rejected its argument that the ICJ lacked jurisdiction to hear the case. The U.S. later blocked enforcement of the judgment by the United Nations Security Council and thereby prevented Nicaragua from obtaining any actual compensation. The Nicaraguan government finally withdrew the complaint from the court in September 1992 (under the government of Violeta Chamorro). on November 12, 1987, the UN General Assembly called for "full and immediate compliance" with the World Court decision. Only Israel joined the United States in opposing adherence to the ruling.

=== El Salvador ===
The Reagan policy in El Salvador aimed to prevent a leftist takeover and maintain a pro-American government. The policy succeeded in preventing the far-left FMLN from gaining power. However, it also faced substantial criticism for the human rights abuses committed by the Salvadoran government and its security forces. In the Salvadoran Civil War between the government of El Salvador and the Farabundo Martí National Liberation Front (FMLN), a coalition or umbrella organization of five left-wing militias, the U.S. supported both the Salvadoran government and the centrist Christian Democrats. The government's security forces were split between reformists and right-wing extremists, who used death squads to stop political and economic change. The Carter administration repeatedly intervened to prevent right-wing coups. The Reagan administration repeatedly threatened aid suspensions to halt right-wing atrocities. As a result, the death squads made plans to kill the U.S. Ambassador.

After years of bloody fighting; the rebels were forced, in part due to U.S. involvement, to concede defeat. The U.S. then threatened to cut off aid to the Salvadoran regime unless it made democratic reforms, which might have let the rebels regroup. As a result; a new Constitution was promulgated, the Armed Forces regulated, a "civilian" police force established, the FMLN metamorphosed from a guerrilla army to a political party that competed in free and fair elections, and an amnesty law was legislated in 1993.

In 2002, a BBC article about President George W. Bush's visit to El Salvador reported that, "U.S. officials say that President George H.W. Bush's policies set the stage for peace, turning El Salvador into a democratic success story." The article also talks about the "tremendous irony that President George W Bush [was] chosen to visit El Salvador on the anniversary of the murder of the country's Archbishop, Óscar Romero, 22 years ago. The irony also falls on his father who was involved with the war during his presidency.

Reagan's policy has been criticized due to the human rights abuses proven repeatedly to be perpetrated by El Salvadoran security force with Amnesty International reporting that it had received: "regular, often daily, reports identifying El Salvador's regular security and military units as responsible for the torture, "disappearance" and killing of civilians. Types of torture reported by those who have survived arrest and interrogation included beatings, sexual abuse, use of chemicals to disorient, mock executions, and the burning of flesh with sulphuric acid." Rudolph Rummel has estimated that from 1979 to 1987, government forces perpetrated between 12,000 and 25,000 democidal killings, with UNHCR estimating higher total figures.

During the war, the FMLN received some aid from the governments of Nicaragua and Cuba, though most weapons were seized from government forces. In 1983, an FMLN broadcast boasted of Cuban and Nicaraguan backing; an FMLN commander alleged that the war was directed by Cuba and that nearly all of his weapons came from Nicaragua. In 1985, the Sandinistas offered to stop military aid to forces in El Salvador in return for an end to the contra insurgency. The Soviet bloc supplied enough arms for several battalions.

The US increased aid as atrocities declined. The UN Truth Commission received direct complaints of almost 2,600 victims of serious violence occurring in 1980. It received direct complaints of just over 140 victims of serious violence occurring in 1985.

=== Guatemala ===
Given José Efraín Ríos Montt's staunch anticommunism and ties to the United States, the Reagan administration continued to support the general and his regime, paying a visit to Guatemala City in December 1982. During a meeting with Ríos Montt on December 4, Reagan declared: "President Ríos Montt is a man of great personal integrity and commitment. ... I know he wants to improve the quality of life for all Guatemalans and to promote social justice." That same day, Guatemalan troops massacred hundreds at Dos Erres.

Ignoring this, Reagan claimed that Guatemala's human rights conditions were improving and used this to justify several major shipments of military hardware to Rios Montt; $4 million in helicopter spare parts and $6.3 million in additional military supplies in 1982 and 1983 respectively. The decision was taken in spite of records concerning human rights violations, bypassing the Congress. Meanwhile, a then-secret 1983 CIA cable noted a rise in "suspect right-wing violence" and an increasing number of bodies "appearing in ditches and gullies". Indigenous Mayans suffered greatly under Ríos Montt's rule. The UN-backed official Historical Clarification Commission found that this was a campaign of deliberate genocide against the population. In May 2013, Ríos Montt was found guilty of genocide against Mayan Indian groups by a Guatemalan court. He was sentenced to 80 years in prison (50 years for genocide and 30 years for crimes against humanity). However, the sentence was quashed by the Constitutional Court and his retrial was never completed because he died. It is estimated that up to tens of thousands of non-combatants were killed during Ríos Montt's time as head of state.

=== Grenada ===
Reagan discusses Grenada with Prime Minister Eugenia Charles of Dominica in the Oval Office in October 1983

The invasion of the Caribbean island Grenada in 1983, ordered by President Reagan, was the first major foreign event of the administration, as well as the first major operation conducted by the military since the Vietnam War. President Reagan justified the invasion by claiming that the cooperation of the island with communist Cuba posed a threat to the United States, and stated the invasion was a response to the illegal overthrow and execution of Grenadian Prime Minister Maurice Bishop, himself a communist, by another faction of communists within his government. After the start of planning for the invasion, the Organisation of Eastern Caribbean States (OECS) appealed to the United States, Barbados, and Jamaica, among other nations, for assistance. The US invasion was poorly done, for it took over 10,000 U.S. forces eight days of fighting, suffering nineteen fatalities and 116 injuries, fighting against several hundred lightly armed policemen and Cuban construction workers. Grenada's Governor-General, Paul Scoon, announced the resumption of the constitution and appointed a new government, and U.S. forces withdrew that December.

While the invasion enjoyed public support in the United States it was criticized by the United Kingdom, Canada and the United Nations General Assembly as "a flagrant violation of international law". The date of the invasion is now a national holiday in Grenada, called Thanksgiving Day.

=== 1982 Falklands War ===
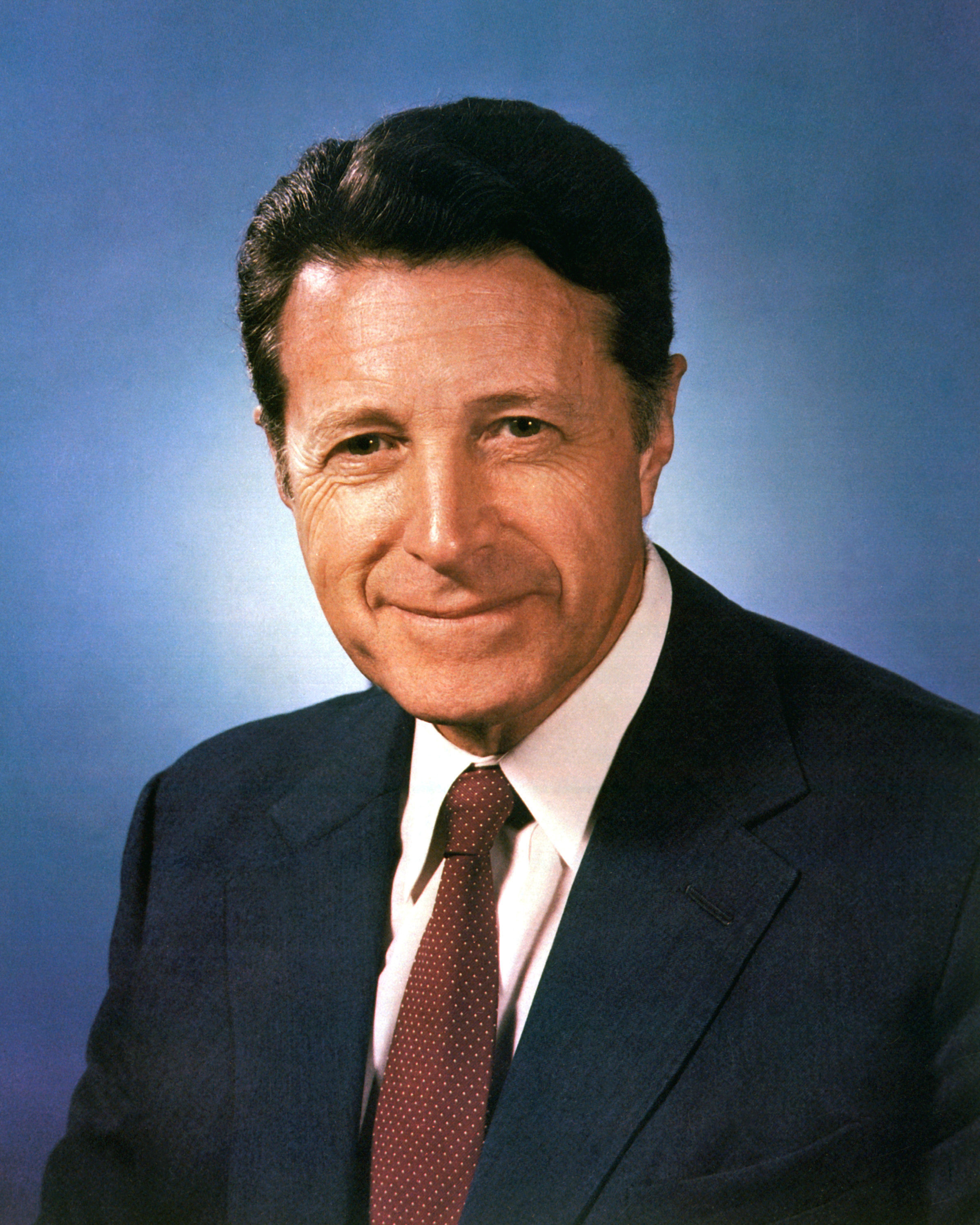
Caspar Weinberger, United States Secretary of Defense between 1981 and 1987

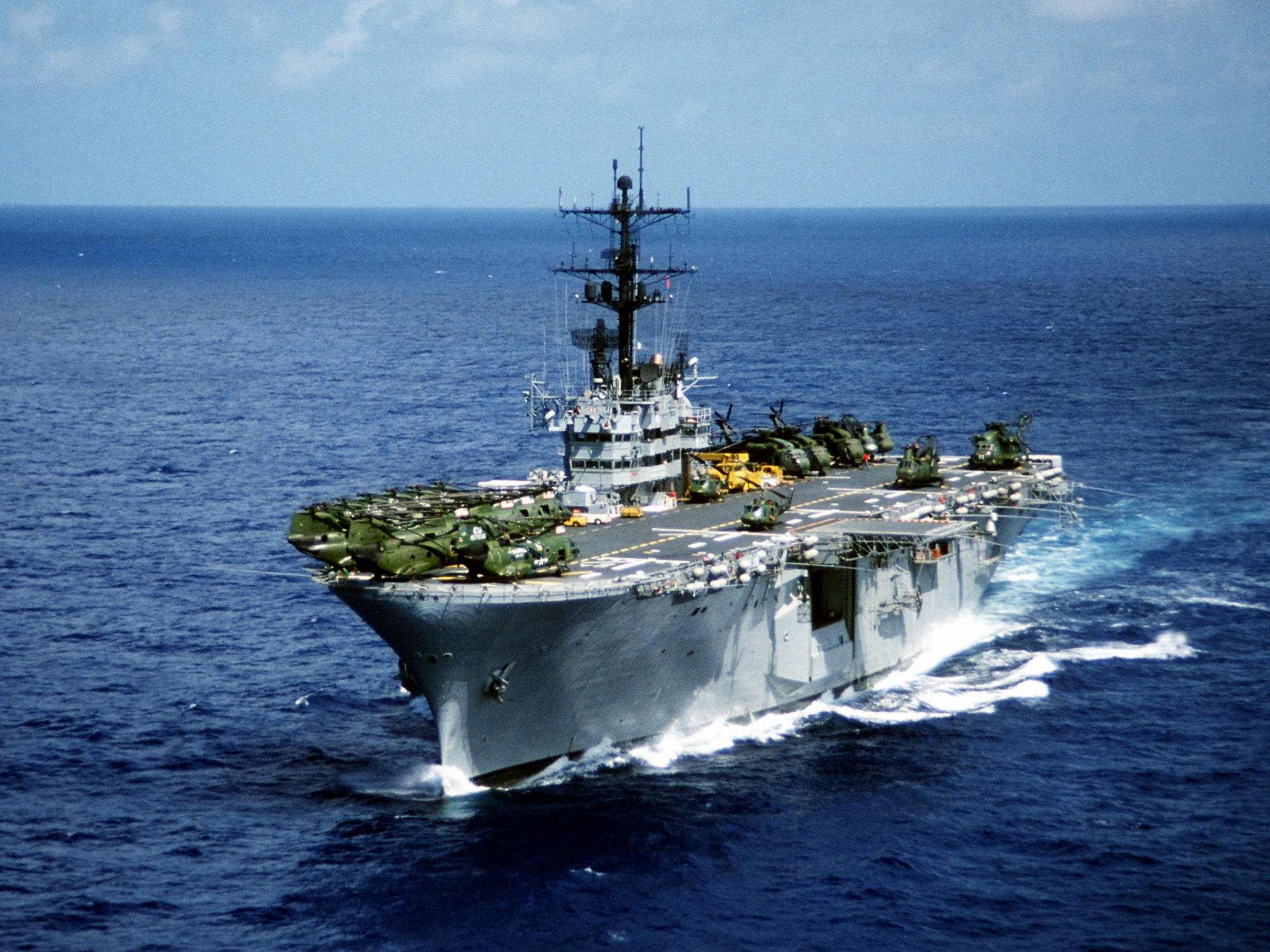
The USS Iwo Jima in the Atlantic Ocean

At first glance, it appeared that the U.S. had military treaty obligations to both parties in the war, bound to the United Kingdom as a member of the North Atlantic Treaty Organization (NATO) and to Argentina by the Inter-American Treaty of Reciprocal Assistance, known as the "Rio Pact". However, the North Atlantic Treaty only obliges the signatories to support if the attack occurs in Europe or North America north of the Tropic of Cancer, and the Rio Pact only obliges the U.S. to intervene if one of the adherents to the treaty is attacked—the UK never attacked Argentina, only Argentine forces on British territory.

In March, Secretary of State Alexander Haig directed the US Ambassador to Argentina Harry W. Shlaudeman to warn the Argentine government away from any invasion. President Reagan requested assurances from Galtieri against an invasion and offered the services of his vice president, George H. W. Bush, as mediator, but was refused.

In fact, the Reagan administration was sharply divided on the issue. Meeting on April 5, Haig and Assistant Secretary of State for Political Affairs Lawrence Eagleburger favoured backing Britain, concerned that equivocation would undermine the NATO alliance. Assistant Secretary of State for Inter-American Affairs Thomas Enders, however, feared that supporting Britain would undermine U.S. anti-communist efforts in Latin America. He received the firm backing of U.N. Ambassador Jeane Kirkpatrick, Haig's nominal subordinate and political rival. Kirkpatrick was guest of honour at a dinner held by the Argentine ambassador to the United States, on the day that the Argentine armed forces landed on the islands.

The White House continued its neutrality. Reagan assented to Haig and Secretary of Defense Caspar Weinberger's position. Between April 8 and 30, Haig headed a "shuttle diplomacy" mission between London and Buenos Aires. According to a BBC documentary titled "The Falklands War and the White House", Caspar Weinberger's Department of Defense began a number of non-public actions to support and supply the British military while Haig's shuttle diplomacy was still ongoing. Haig's message to the Argentines was that the British would indeed fight, and that the U.S. would support Britain, but at the time he was not aware that the U.S. was providing support already.

At the end of the April, Reagan declared U.S. support for Britain, and announced the imposition of economic sanctions on Argentina.

At 11:30 pm London time on May 31, 1982, Reagan told Mrs Thatcher that "The best chance for peace was before complete Argentine humiliation", he told her. "As the UK now had the upper hand militarily, it should strike a deal now." and suggesting a multi-national, peacekeeping force. Her reply was that "Britain had had to go into the islands alone, with no outside help, she could not now let the invader gain from his aggression."

American non-interference was vital to the American-British relationship. Ascension Island, a British possession, was vital in the long-term supply of the Task Force South; however, the airbase stationed on it was run and operated by the U.S. The American commander of the base was ordered to assist the British in any way and for a brief period Ascension Air Field was one of the busiest airports in the world. The most important NATO contributions were intelligence information and the rescheduled supply of the latest model of Sidewinder Lima all-aspect infra-red seeking missiles, which allowed existing British stocks to be employed.

Margaret Thatcher stated that "without the Harrier jets and their immense manoeuvrability, equipped as they were with the latest version of the Sidewinder missile, supplied to us by U.S. Secretary of Defense Caspar Weinberger, we could never have got back the Falklands."

In early May, Caspar Weinberger offered the use of an American aircraft carrier. This seemingly extremely generous offer was seen by some as vital: it was noted by Rear Admiral Woodward that the loss of Invincible would have been a severe setback, but the loss of Hermes would have meant an end to the whole operation. Weinberger admitted that there would have been many problems if a request had ever been made; not least, it would have meant U.S. personnel becoming directly involved in the conflict, as training British forces to crew the vessel would have taken years. In the July 2012 newsletter of the United States Naval Institute, which was reprinted online at the institute's web site, it was revealed that the Reagan administration actively offered the use of the amphibious assault helicopter carrier Iwo Jima (pictured) as a replacement in case either of the two British carriers had been damaged or destroyed. This top-secret contingency plan was revealed to the staff of the Naval Institute by John Lehman, the U.S. Secretary of the Navy at the time of the Falklands War, from a speech provided to the Naval Institute that Lehman made in Portsmouth, U.K., on June 26, 2012. Lehman stated that the loan of the Iwo Jima was made in response to a request from the Royal Navy, and it had the endorsement of U.S. President Ronald Reagan and U.S. Secretary of Defense Caspar Weinberger. The actual planning for the Iwo Jima loan-out was done by the staff of the U.S. Second Fleet under the direction of Vice Admiral James Lyons who confirmed Lehman's revelations with the Naval Institute staff. Contingency planning envisioned American military contractors, likely retired sailors with knowledge of the Iwo Jima's systems, assisting the British in manning the U.S. helicopter carrier during the loan-out. Naval analyst Eric Wertheim compared this arrangement to the Flying Tigers. Significantly, except for U.S. Secretary of State Alexander Haig, the U.S. Department of State was not included in the loan-out negotiations. These 2012 revelations made headlines in the United Kingdom, but except for the U.S. Naval Institute, not in the United States.

Both Weinberger and Reagan were later awarded the British honour of Knight Commander of the Order of the British Empire (KBE). American critics of the U.S. role claimed that, by failing to side with Argentina, the U.S. violated its own Monroe Doctrine.

== Oceania ==
=== Australia ===
In 1983, the Reagan administration approached Australia with proposals for testing the new generation of American intercontinental ballistic missiles, the MX missile. American test ranges in the Pacific were insufficient for testing the new long-range missiles and the United States military wished to use the Tasman Sea as a target area. Australian Prime Minister Malcolm Fraser of the Liberal Party had agreed to provide monitoring sites near Sydney for this purpose. However, in 1985, the new-elected Prime Minister Bob Hawke, of the Labor Party, withdrew Australia from the testing program, sparking criticism from the Reagan administration. Hawke had been pressured into doing so by the left-wing faction of the Labor Party, which opposed the proposed MX missile test in the Tasman Sea. The Labor left-wing faction also strongly sympathized with the New Zealand Fourth Labour Government's anti-nuclear policy and supported a South Pacific Nuclear Free Zone.

To preserve its joint Australian-US military communications facilities, the Reagan administration also had to assure the Hawke Government that those installations would not be used in the Strategic Defense Initiative project, which the Australian Labor Party strongly opposed. Despite these disagreements, the Hawke Labor Government still remained supportive of the ANZUS security treaty, a trilateral pact between Australia, New Zealand and the United States which was signed on September 1, 1951. It also did not support its New Zealand counterpart's ban on nuclear-armed and nuclear-powered ships. Following the US's suspension of defence and intelligence cooperation with New Zealand in February 1985, the Australian government also endorsed the Reagan administration's plans to cancel trilateral military exercises and to postpone the ANZUS foreign ministers conference. However, it still continued to maintain bilateral military ties and continued to share intelligence information with New Zealand. Unlike New Zealand, Australia continued to allow US Navy warships to visit its ports and to participate in joint military exercises with the United States.

=== New Zealand ===
Some Western countries have anti-nuclear and other movements which seek to diminish defense cooperation among the allied states. We would hope that our response to New Zealand would signal that the course these movements advocate would not be cost–free in terms of security relationships with the United States.

— Bernard Kalb, United States Department of State spokesman, reproduced in "U.S. Plans Actions to Answer Rebuff by New Zealand", The New York Times, 6 February 1985.

In 1984, the newly elected Labour government under Prime Minister David Lange adopted a hardline anti-nuclear position, banning the entry of nuclear-powered and nuclear-armed warships into New Zealand waters. Reasons cited were the dangers of American nuclear weapons, continued nuclear testing in the South Pacific, and opposition to US President Reagan's policy of aggressively confronting the Soviet Union. Nuclear disarmament was also championed by a vocal pacifist anti-nuclear movement aligned with the mainstream political left. Since the United States Navy refused to confirm or deny the presence of nuclear weapons aboard ships, this law essentially refused access to New Zealand ports for all USN ships. Since New Zealand was a member of the tripartite ANZUS security alliance, which also included Australia and the United States, this created tensions in US-NZ relations.

The Reagan administration regarded New Zealand's anti-nuclear stance as incongruous with its Cold War policy of only conducting strategic arms reductions from a position of strength. The US government was also concerned that the Soviet Union was working through local Communist parties like the Socialist Unity Party to influence the Labour Party, anti-nuclear organizations, and the trade union movement as part of a strategy of steering New Zealand's foreign policy away from its traditional ally the United States.

In February 1985, a port-visit request by the United States for the USS Buchanan was refused by the New Zealand government on the basis that the Buchanan was capable of launching nuclear depth bombs. Following consultations with Australia and after further negotiations with the New Zealand government broke down, the Reagan administration severed its ANZUS treaty obligations to NZ until US Navy ships were readmitted to NZ ports. Despite the ANZUS split, Secretary of State George P. Shultz maintained that the ANZUS structure was still in place, should NZ decide to reverse its anti-nuclear policy and return to a fully operational defense relationship with the US. The Republican Senator William Cohen also advocated trade retaliation against New Zealand and urged the Reagan administration to negotiate a separate bilateral security treaty with Australia. Ultimately, the Reagan administration opted not to pursue economic retaliatory measures against New Zealand. President Reagan also maintained in NSDD 193 (National Security Decision Directive) that New Zealand still remained a "friend, but not an ally".

In 1987, the Republican Congressman William Broomfield sponsored a bill known as the Broomfield Bill (the New Zealand Military Preference Suspension Act) that would have deprived New Zealand of its favored status as an ally when purchasing military equipment from the United States. On October 20, 1987, the United States House of Representatives passed the Broomfield Bill by a substantial majority. According to former New Zealand diplomat Malcolm Templeton, this bill was a symbolic endorsement by the Democratic-controlled Congress of the Reagan administration's earlier decision to suspend its defence commitments to New Zealand. The Broomfield Bill also included an amendment added by the Democratic Congressman Stephen J. Solarz that would allow the U.S. president to restore the ANZUS relationship if NZ modified its nuclear-free policy.

However, the Broomfield Bill languished in the United States Senate. Following the 1988 US Senate elections, the lame duck 100th Congress dropped a package containing the Broomfield Bill after Senator Edward Kennedy opposed its inclusion. Thus, the Broomfield Bill was never passed by the Senate and formally ratified into law. While the Reagan administration continued to eschew contact with the Lange government, it continued to maintain ties with the center-right opposition National Party, which opposed the Nuclear Free Bill. Despite the suspension of ANZUS ties and ship visits, the United States's Antarctica research program Operation Deep Freeze continued to send military aircraft to Christchurch International Airport en route to US bases in the Antarctica.

The Heritage Foundation and the United States Information Service also unsuccessfully tried to influence New Zealand public opinion in favor of supporting the resumption of ANZUS ties by sponsoring trips to the US by sympathetic journalists, politicians, and academics. Several of these individuals later tried to organize grassroots pro-ANZUS groups to counter the influence of the peace movement. Undaunted, the Labour government was re-elected in 1987 and went on to pass New Zealand Nuclear Free Zone, Disarmament, and Arms Control Act 1987 into law, making the entire country a nuclear-free zone, but still remaining within the ANZUS alliance.

== Sub-Saharan Africa ==
=== Angola ===
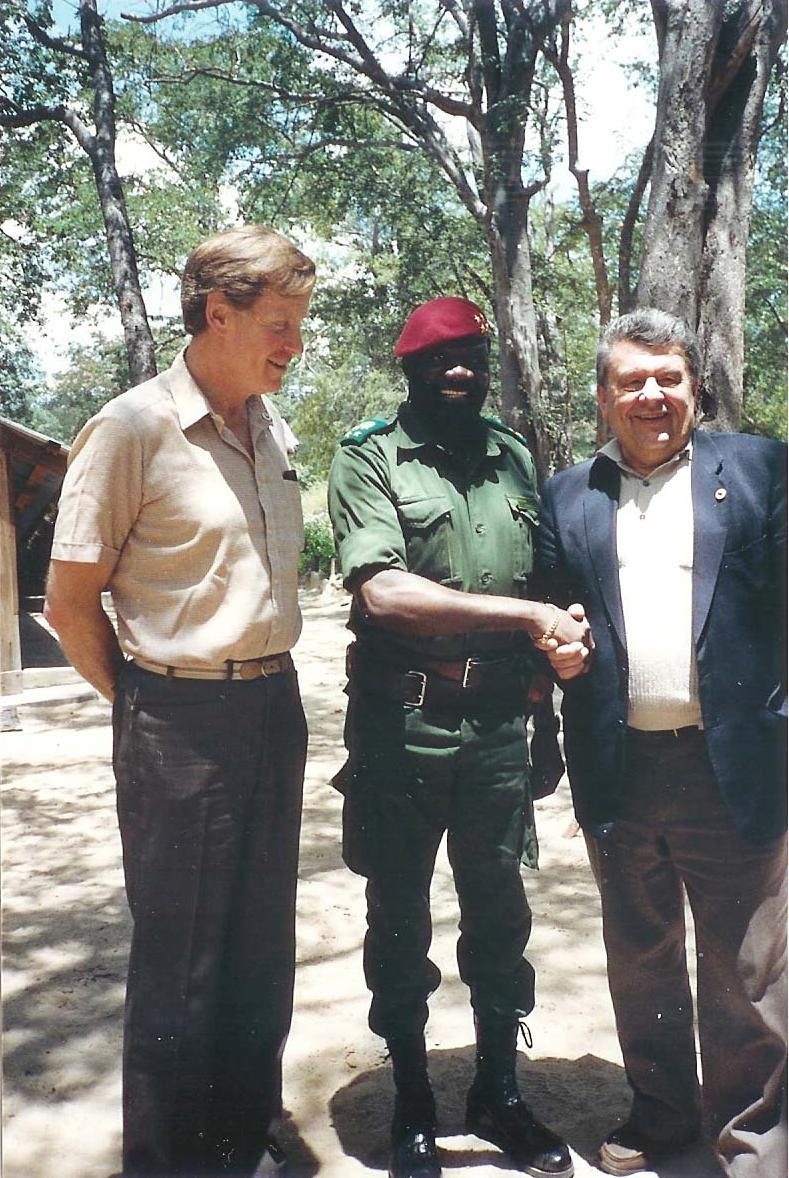
Jonas Savimbi, a key Reagan Doctrine ally in Angola during the Cold War, meeting European Parliament deputies in 1989

War between western supported movements and the communist MPLA government in Angola, and Cuban and South African military intervention there, led to a decades-long civil war that cost up to one million lives. The Reagan administration offered covert aid to the National Union for the Total Independence of Angola (UNITA), a group of anti-communist and pro capitalist fighters led by Jonas Savimbi, whose attacks were backed by South Africa and the US. Dr. Peter Hammond, a Christian missionary who lived in Angola at the time, recalled:

There were over 50,000 Cuban troops in the country. The communists had attacked and destroyed many churches. MiG-23s and Mi-24 Hind helicopter gun ships were terrorising villagers in Angola. I documented numerous atrocities, including the strafing of villages, schools and churches. In 1986, I remember hearing Ronald Reagan's speech ... "We are going to send stinger missiles to the UNITA Freedom Fighters in Angola!" Those who were listening to the SW radio with me looked at one another in stunned amazement. After a long silence as we wondered if our ears had actually heard what we thought we heard, one of us said: "That would be nice!" We scarcely dared believe that it would happen. But it did. Not long afterwards the stinger missiles began to arrive in UNITA controlled Free Angola. Soviet aircraft were shot down. The bombing and strafing of villagers, schools and churches came to an end. Without any doubt, Ronald Reagan's policies saved many tens of thousands of lives in Angola.

Human rights observers have accused the MPLA of "genocidal atrocities", "systematic extermination", "war crimes" and "crimes against humanity". The MPLA held blatantly rigged elections in 1992, which were rejected by eight opposition parties. An official observer wrote that there was little UN supervision, that 500,000 UNITA voters were disenfranchised and that there were 100 clandestine polling stations. UNITA sent peace negotiators to the capital, where the MPLA murdered them, along with 20,000 UNITA members. Savimbi was still ready to continue the elections. The MPLA then massacred tens of thousands of UNITA and National Liberation Front of Angola (FNLA) voters nationwide.

Savimbi was strongly supported by The Heritage Foundation, whose foreign policy analyst Michael Johns and other conservatives visited regularly with Savimbi in his clandestine camps in Jamba and provided the rebel leader with ongoing political and military guidance in his war against the Angolan government. During a visit to Washington, D.C. in 1986, Reagan invited Savimbi to meet with him at the White House. Following the meeting, Reagan spoke of UNITA winning "a victory that electrifies the world". Savimbi also met with Reagan's successor, George H. W. Bush, who promised Savimbi "all appropriate and effective assistance".

The killing of Savimbi in February 2002 by the Angolan military led to the decline of UNITA's influence. Savimbi was succeeded by Paulo Lukamba Gato. Six weeks after Savimbi's death, UNITA agreed to a ceasefire with the MPLA, but Angola remains deeply divided politically between MPLA and UNITA supporters. Parliamentary elections in September 2008 resulted in an overwhelming majority for the MPLA, but their legitimacy was questioned by international observers.

=== South Africa ===
During Ronald Reagan's presidency South Africa continued to use a non-democratic system of government based on racial discrimination, known as apartheid, in which the minority of white South Africans exerted nearly complete legal control over the lives of the non-white majority of the citizens. In the early 1980s the issue had moved to the center of international attention as a result of events in the townships and outcry at the death of Stephen Biko. Reagan administration policy called for "constructive engagement" with the apartheid government of South Africa. This consisted of providing incentives to encourage the South African government to engage in dialogue with its black citizens over a possible end to apartheid. In opposition to the condemnations issued by the US Congress and public demands for diplomatic or economic sanctions, Reagan made relatively minor criticisms of the regime, which was otherwise internationally isolated, and the US granted recognition and economic and military aid to the government during Reagan's first term. South Africa's military was then engaged in an occupation of Namibia and proxy wars in several neighboring countries, in alliance with Savimbi's UNITA. Reagan administration officials saw the apartheid government as a key anti-communist ally.

In a 1984 address to the UN, Reagan supported a peaceful evolution away from apartheid but was unwilling to pressure South Africa to change. When South African Anglican bishop Desmond Tutu won the Nobel Peace Prize for his efforts to eliminate apartheid, Reagan received him in late 1984, congratulated him, but reiterated his policy of constructive engagement. However, speaking on Capitol Hill at a House hearing, Tutu delivered a speech, declaring "constructive engagement is an abomination, an unmitigated disaster."

In my view, the Reagan administration's support and collaboration with it is equally immoral, evil, and totally un-Christian. ... You are either for or against apartheid and not by rhetoric. You are either in favor of evil or you are in favor of good. You are either on the side of the oppressed or on the side of the oppressor. You can't be neutral.

As Reagan began his second term, black opposition to apartheid grew increasingly militant and occasionally violent, as did the apartheid government's crackdown. In April 1985 Reagan came under attack from within the Republican Party itself. The Republican majority in the Senate voted 89–4 on a resolution condemning apartheid. By summer Congress was pushing for sanctions, so Reagan decided to preempt congressional action and make an "abrupt reversal" by issuing on September 9 Executive Order 12532 prohibiting some kinds of bank loans to the apartheid government and imposing an arms embargo. However, these sanctions were seen as weak by anti-Apartheid activists. In September 1986, Reagan vetoed the tougher sanctions of the Comprehensive Anti-Apartheid Act (CAAA), but this was overridden by a bipartisan effort in Congress the following month. However, Reagan refused to enforce the sanctions in any meaningful way. At least 2,000 political prisoners remained detained without trial.

In October 1987, pursuant to the CAAA, Reagan submitted a follow-up report that said additional sanctions "would not be helpful". P. W. Botha, the South African foreign minister, responded by saying that Reagan "and his administration have an understanding" of what he called "the reality of South Africa". In 1988, Congress rejected a bill that would have imposed a total economic embargo against the Republic.

By 1990, under Reagan's successor George H. W. Bush, the new South African government of F. W. de Klerk was introducing widespread reforms.

=== Zaire ===
Mobutu Sese Seko enjoyed a very warm relationship with the Reagan administration, through financial donations. During Reagan's presidency, Mobutu visited the White House three times, and criticism of Zaire's human rights record by the US was effectively muted. During a state visit by Mobutu in 1983, Reagan praised the Zairian strongman as "a voice of good sense and goodwill".

== Human rights ==
=== Armenian genocide ===
Reagan referred to the "genocide of the Armenians" in a 1981 statement commemorating the liberation of the Nazi death camps. Reagan was the first U.S. president to personally use the term "genocide" to reference the systematic eradication of the Armenian people at the hands of the Ottoman Empire between 1915 and 1923.

Previously, the U.S. spent over a billion dollars in humanitarian relief funding for the crisis starting in 1918 and also recognized the Armenian "genocide" in a statement to the International Court of Justice in 1951.

=== Bitburg controversy ===
In 1985, Reagan visited Kolmeshohe cemetery in Bitburg in "honor of German soldiers killed in World War II". The Kolmeshohe cemetery included graves of 49 Nazi Waffen-SS soldiers. Reagan and West German Chancellor Helmut Kohl planned to lay a wreath in the cemetery "in a spirit of reconciliation, in a spirit of forty years of peace, in a spirit of economic and military compatibility." Reagan had declined to visit any concentration camps during the visit because he thought it would "send the wrong signal" to the German people and was "unnecessary".

This led to protest and condemnation by Jewish groups, veterans, Congress, and the Anti-Defamation League. Politicians, veterans, and Jewish demonstrators from the United States, France, Britain, West Germany, Belgium, the Netherlands, Israel, and other countries protested the Reagan's visit. Due to the Bitburg controversy, Reagan did end up visiting the Bergen-Belsen concentration camp during his trip. During the visit Reagan honored Anne Frank but also stated, "The evil world of Nazism turned all values upside down. Nevertheless, we can mourn the German war dead today as human beings, crushed by a vicious ideology."

Leading up to the visit, U.S. president Richard Nixon acknowledged Reagan's planned trip already caused "substantial domestic political damage", but he urged Reagan not to cancel or alter the itinerary, as it would "undermine Reagan's standing with the Western European allies and his ability to negotiate with the Soviets and in the Middle East, putting the credibility of future negotiations is at stake."

The New York Times reported in 1985, "White House aides have acknowledged that (Reagan's) Bitburg visit is probably the biggest fiasco of Mr. Reagan's Presidency." They described Reagan's decision to go through with the Bitburg visit was a "blunder", and one of the few times that Reagan lost a confrontation in the court of public opinion.

=== Ratification of the Convention on Genocide ===
In 1986, the U.S. ratified the United Nations Genocide Convention, 36 years after originally signing the treaty. The convention was created "in response to the Nazi atrocities against the Jews". The United States Holocaust Memorial Museum and the textbook of Oxford University Human Rights explained the sudden ratification as a direct response to the Bitburg controversy and an attempt for Reagan to "make amends" for the visit.

This "gesture of concession to public outrage" was undermined by "a number of provisions immunizing the U.S. against the possibility of ever being charged with genocide." The U.S. ratification included so many treaty reservations "that the convention would not meaningfully bind the United States to much of anything" and the ratification was described as substantially "meaningless".

The vote to ratify the treaty in the Senate was 83 in favor, 11 against and 6 not voting. The U.S. was the 98th country to ratify the Genocide Convention. The U.S. had previously refused to become a party from 1948 to 1985 because it was "nervous about its own record on race": U.S. Southern senators worried "that Jim Crow laws could constitute genocide under the Convention".

=== International Court of Justice Jurisdiction ===
On April 6, 1984, the United States attempted to modify its declaration accepting the compulsory jurisdiction of the International Court of Justice, in order to exclude disputes involving Central America for a period of two years. Then on January 18, 1985, the United States notified the ICJ that it would no longer participate in the Nicaragua v. United States proceedings. On June 27, 1986, the ICJ ruled that U.S. support to the contras in Nicaragua was illegal, and demanded that the U.S. pay reparations to the Sandinistas. Reagan's State Department said "the United States rejected the Court's verdict, and said the ICJ was not equipped to judge complex international military issues."

Finally, and most significantly, on October 7, 1985, the United States terminated its acceptance of the ICJ's compulsory jurisdiction. The decision was critiqued by The New York Times as "damaging our foreign policy interests, undermining our legitimacy as a voice for morality, eroding the rule of law in international relations."

== See also ==
- Cold War
- List of international presidential trips made by Ronald Reagan
- Presidency of Ronald Reagan
- Reagan Doctrine
