= Donald Fortier =

Donald R. Fortier (January 9, 1947 – August 23, 1986) was a member of the United States Intelligence Community.

== Biography ==
Fortier was born on January 9, 1947, in Columbus, Ohio.

He received his B.A. from Miami University in Oxford, Ohio, and his M.A. in political science and international relations from the University of Chicago, where he studied under Albert Wohlstetter. He was the recipient of a Ford Foundation fellowship in Chicago.

Prior to working for the U.S. Government, Fortier also worked as a consultant to the Rand Corporation on national security issues.

== Federal service ==
=== National Security Council ===
Donald Fortier joined the National Security Council in September 1982 as Director for Western Europe and NATO. In June 1983, he assumed the position of Senior Director for Political-Military Affairs and Special Assistant to the President. In December 1983 he was appointed to the rank of Deputy Assistant to the President with responsibility for policy development.

From February 1981 until joining the National Security Council staff, Fortier served as deputy director for Policy Planning at the State Department. He received the Department's Superior Honor Award for his work in that position. Prior to his service in the State Dept., he served for 5 years as a senior member of the professional staff of the House Foreign Affairs Committee.

On December 10, 1985, President Reagan announced that Fortier would serve as the Principal Deputy Assistant to the President for National Security Affairs, succeeding John Poindexter. He was the 14th person to serve in this role.

=== Iran-Contra ===
Fortier's name appears in several internal NSC emails that have been released to the public in conjunction with the Iran-Contra affair and other matters from that time period. As Poindexter's deputy, and Oliver North's direct superior, Fortier had a central role in the Iran-Contra affair, having been present at key meetings where alternative funding sources for the U.S.-backed paramilitary incursion into Nicaragua and the use of third parties for arms transfers were discussed, and having given permission to North to engage in fundraising via the so-called Channel-Miller Operation, whereby wealthy Americans were encouraged to make "donations" to ad hoc front organizations such as the National Endowment for the Preservation of Liberty, which would be routed either to the Nicaraguan paramilitaries or to Richard Secord and Albert Hakim's for-profit venture, known to its principals as the "Enterprise" as needed. According to the Walsh commission, especially generous "donors" were rewarded with personal meetings with North or with President Reagan himself.

=== Illness and departure from the NSC ===
Donald Fortier left the NSC on medical leave in the spring of 1986, and died of cancer in August of that year. He was married, with one child, and resided in Bethesda, MD.

== Family ==
Fortier's wife, Alison B. Fortier, is also a noted member of the U.S. intelligence community, having served as Special Assistant to the President and Senior Director of the NSC's Legislative Affairs Directorate in 1987–1988, and on the Commission on Protecting and Reducing Government Secrecy (1997). Also surviving Donald were his brother Tom Fortier, his parents Stella and Robert Fortier, and his son, Graham Fortier. His daughter, Merrill Fortier, was born in the October following his death.

President Ronald Reagan wrote in his diary on September 9, 1986: "Don Fortier's family came by. A memorial service was held today. I couldn’t attend—security reasons—so his widow, small son, brother, parents & her parents came to the Oval Office".

Legal offices
Preceded by John Poindexter	Deputy National Security Advisor; 1985 – 1986	Succeeded by Peter Rodman
