= Peter Rodman =

American government official

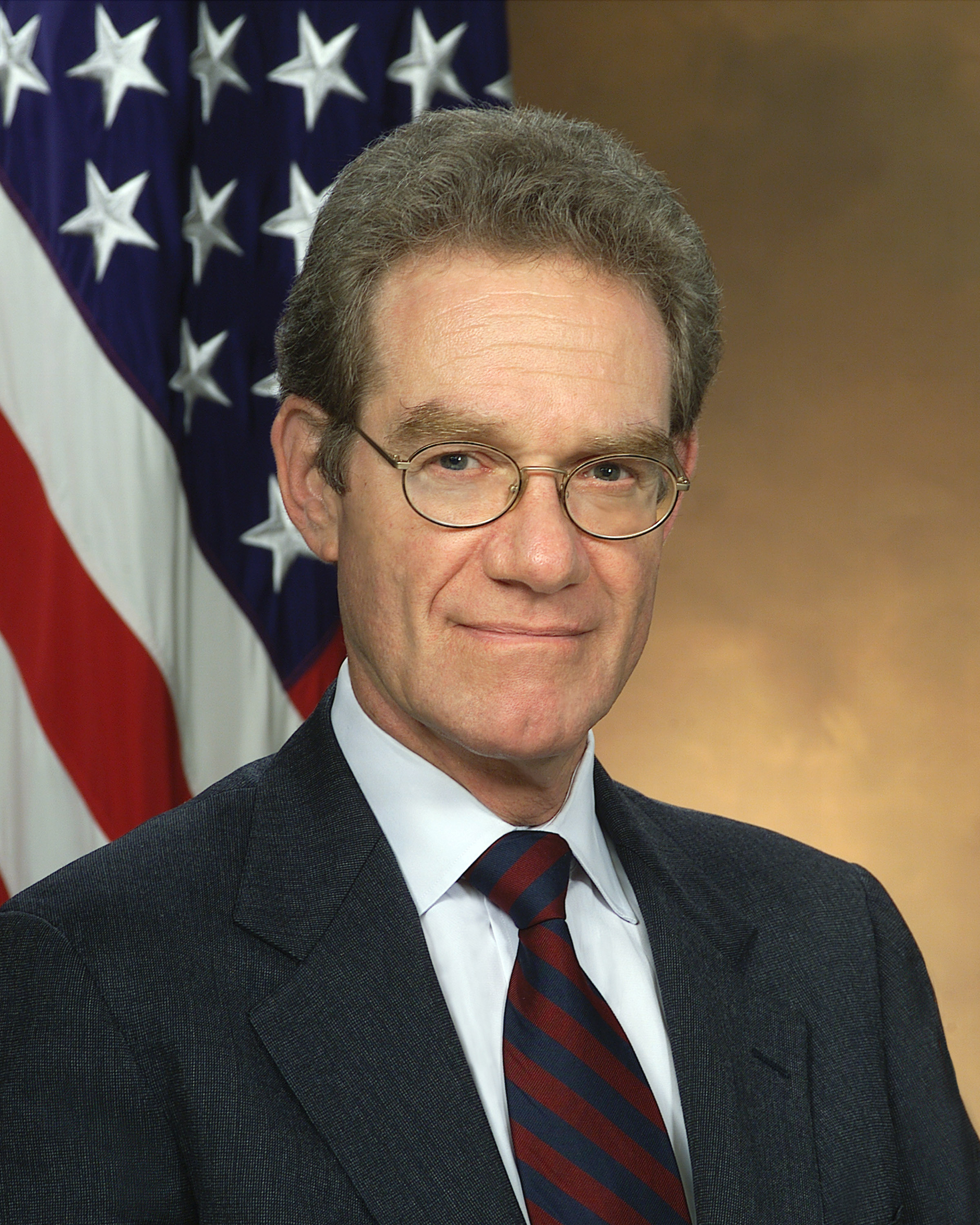

Assistant Secretary of Defense for International Security Affairs
- In office July 16, 2001 – March 2, 2007
- President: George W. Bush
- Preceded by: Franklin D. Kramer
- Succeeded by: Mary Beth Long

15th United States Deputy National Security Advisor
- In office March 1986 – December 1986
- President: Ronald Reagan
- Preceded by: Donald Fortier
- Succeeded by: Colin Powell

14th Director of Policy Planning
- In office April 9, 1984 – March 3, 1986
- President: Ronald Reagan
- Preceded by: Stephen W. Bosworth
- Succeeded by: Richard H. Solomon

Personal details
- Born: Peter Warren Rodman; November 24, 1943 Boston, Massachusetts, U.S.
- Died: August 2, 2008 (aged 64) Baltimore, Maryland, U.S.
- Education: Harvard University (AB, JD); Worcester College, Oxford (BA, MA)

Peter Warren Rodman (November 24, 1943 – August 2, 2008) was an American attorney, government official, author, and national security adviser.

== Early life and education ==
Born in Boston, he was educated at The Roxbury Latin School. He earned an A.B from Harvard College, a B.A. and M.A. from Worcester College, Oxford, and a Juris Doctor from Harvard Law School.

== Career ==
Rodman began his career in government as a staff member on the National Security Council, working from 1969 to 1977 and serving as an assistant to Henry Kissinger. From 1977 to 1983, he was a Fellow at the Center for Strategic and International Studies. From 1984 to 1986, Rodman served as Director of Policy Planning under Ronald Reagan. He served as Reagan's Deputy National Security Advisor from March to December 1986. From 1987 to 1990, he served as Special Assistant to the President for National Security Affairs and National Security Council Counselor.

He was one of the signers of the January 26, 1998 Project for the New American Century sent to the U.S. President Bill Clinton. He worked extensively with Henry Kissinger, helping him write his memoirs. He was a member of the board of trustees of Freedom House, Vice President and member of the board of directors of the World Affairs Council and a Fellow of the Foreign Policy Institute of SAIS.

From 1991 to 1999, Rodman was a senior editor at National Review, a conservative magazine. He also served as the Director of National Security Programs at the Center for the National Interest, a conservative think-tank founded by Richard Nixon.

Rodman returned to government service as Assistant Secretary of Defense for International Security Affairs in the George W. Bush administration.

In March 2007, he left his position as United States Assistant Secretary of Defense for International Security Affairs to become a Senior Fellow at Brookings Institution. He was the author of More Precious Than Peace, a book on the Cold War in the Third World in which he praises the Reagan administration for warding off communism in Afghanistan, Angola, and Cambodia.

== Personal life ==
Rodman and his wife, Veronique, had two children. Veronique was named a member of the Broadcasting Board of Governors by George W. Bush, serving from 2003 to 2004. Rodman died in Baltimore, Maryland, on August 2, 2008, from leukemia. He was 64.

== Bibliography ==
- Development administration: Obstacles, theories and implications for planning (IIEP occasional papers) (1968)
- More Precious Than Peace: Fighting and Winning the Cold War in the Third World (1994) ISBN 0-684-19427-9
- Nato's role in a new European security order (The future of NATO GPIS working paper) (1995)
- Arms Control and the U.S.-Russian Relationship (1996) 1
- America adrift: A strategic assessment (1996)
- Broken triangle: China, Russia, and America after 25 years (1997)
- Between friendship and rivalry: China and America in the 21st century (1998)
- editor of NATO at FIFTY: Perspectives on the Future of the Transatlantic Alliance (1999) ISBN 0-9670233-0-0
- Drifting apart?: Trends in U.S.-European relations (1999)
- Uneasy giant: The challenges to American predominance (2000)
- Presidential Command: Power, Leadership, and the Making of Foreign Policy from Richard Nixon to George W. Bush (2009)

Legal offices
Preceded by Donald Fortier	Deputy National Security Advisor; 1986–1987	Succeeded by Colin Powell
