= National Endowment for the Preservation of Liberty =

The National Endowment for the Preservation of Liberty (NEPL) was a shell company used by Oliver North to provide funds and support the Contras who were fighting the left-wing Sandinista government. The company was a way for wealthy American citizens who were sympathetic to Reagan's Contra policy to donate large sums of money and arms to Nicaragua. The company used the International Business Communications (IBC) to funnel money to the Contras.

== History ==
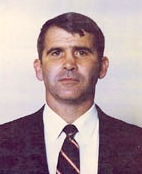
Oliver North

The company was created in 1984 by Carl Channell and Richard R. Miller. The company used education and general public as a front for their backdoor operations. The company was exempted for taxes under Section 501(c)(3) of the Internal Revenue Code. The private fundraisers were considered “ground troops” for Oliver North and Richard Secord's operations. The organization had close ties to the White House which was imperative for the funding.

== Iran Contra ==
The funds were from the NEPL and sent directly to the Contras. In 1985, Channell organized an operation to support a ``Nicaraguan Refugee Fund Dinner''. The dinner was intended to raise money to fund the Contras. The company began giving Adolfo Calero public relations advice to the Calero’s Nicaraguan Development Council and received $44,000. After their first White House briefing, wealthy donors donated thousands of dollars. Mousalreza Ebrahim Zadeh, a fraudulent representative for the Saudi Government, promised to donate fourteen million dollars to the cause. More than $257,000 were allocated to the IBC.

== The Enterprise ==
In June 1985 Oliver North and Richard Secord diverted funding to the “Enterprise” which was a name commonly used for the illegal trading of weapons and training of Contra troops. The Enterprise started a company known as the Stanford Technology Trading Group International. The company was run by Albert Hakim and Secord. They also created a string of shell companies throughout Switzerland. The company received over 33 million dollars from Iran dealings (related to the selling of U.S. arms in Iran). North ordered Miller to send 1.7 million dollars to the Enterprise's Lake Resources account in Switzerland and to offshore Cayman Island bank accounts.

--------------------------------------------------------------------------------------------------------------------------------

.....9/20/85: .....$130,000 .....from the I.C. Inc. account

.....9/26/85: .....$100,000 .....from the I.C. Inc. account

.....11/1/85: .....$150,000 .....from the I.C. Inc. account

.....11/18/85: .....$48,000 .....from the I.C. Inc. account

.....12/16/85: .....$300,000 .....from the IBC account

.....1/21/86: .....$360,000 .....from the I.C. Inc. account

.....4/11/86: .....$650,000 .....from the I.C. Inc. accountrn,n,s,n

--------------------------------------------------------------------------------------------------------------------------------

== Uncovering the fraud ==
“In the spring of 1987 Channell and Miller each pleaded guilty to a felony: conspiracy to defraud the United States. Together they provided extensive information about their fundraising activities. The pleas were based on Channell and Miller's illegal use of a tax-exempt organization to raise funds for non-charitable items, including weapons and other lethal supplies for the contras.”- Final Report of the Independent Counsel for Iran/Contra Matters
