= Walter Pforzheimer =

Dean of intelligence literature and CIA officer

Dean of Intelligence Literature Walter Pforzheimer
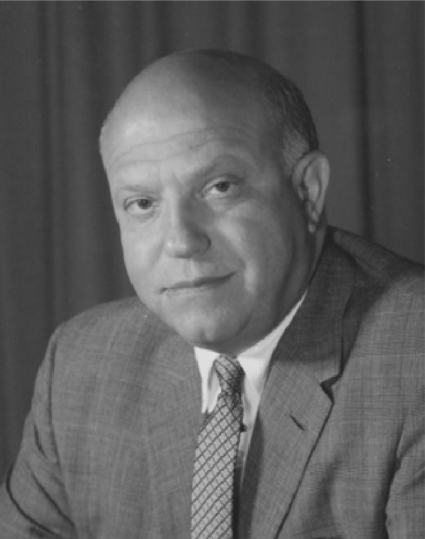

Legislative Counsel of the Central Intelligence Group
- In office 1946–1947

1st Legislative Counsel of the Central Intelligence Agency
- In office 1947–1955
- Succeeded by: Norman Paul

1st Curator of the Historical Intelligence Collection at the Central Intelligence Agency
- In office 1956–1974
- Appointed by: Allen Dulles

Personal details
- Born: 15 August 1914 Port Chester, New York
- Died: 10 February 2003 (Aged 88) Washington, D.C.
- Domestic partner: Alice D'Angelo
- Parent: Walter Pforzheimer
- Education: Yale University
- Awards: Bronze Star Medal
- Uncle: Carl Pforzheimer
- Nickname: OGO

Military service
- Branch/service: Office of Strategic Services; United States Army Air Forces
- Battles/wars: World War II

Walter Lionel Pforzheimer Jr. (August 15, 1914 – February 10, 2003) was an American intelligence officer, master spy, lawyer, and bibliophile specializing in Intelligence literature and intelligence history. He played a crucial role in the early development of the Central Intelligence Agency (CIA) and its legislative framework, drafting portions of and securing congressional approval for the National Security Act of 1947, which formally established the CIA. He was one of the founding members of the CIA and was the CIA's first Legislative Counsel, acting as the primary liaison between the agency and Congress. Pforzheimer later became a senior CIA officer and a recognized expert on intelligence matters. The CIA today recognizes him as one of their trailblazers and one of their greatest lawyers, but he told his eulogizer that he hated two things; his middle name, and being a lawyer. He was well-respected, by his coworkers and his adversaries, as an avid historian and advisor on intelligence matters. Throughout his life, he amassed an extensive private library on intelligence and espionage, which became one of the most significant collections in the field, and donated portions of his collection to institutions such as Yale University. Today, it is argued by the historian Timothy Naftali, there is not a single course taught in intelligence history in the English speaking world that has not benefited from Pforzheimer's work.

The New York Times Magazine wrote upon his death, that Pforzheimer: "...never married and was often described as crusty, outspoken and a curmudgeon -- euphemisms for his conservative politics, social views that included crude prejudice against Jews and blacks and a manner that could veer from fawning on the great to public abuse of menials... Pforzheimer did not warm to every aspirant, and once he took a dislike to someone he held on to it for life."

== Early life ==
In 1914, Walter Pforzheimer Jr., was born in Port Chester, New York. In the delivery room of the hospital, the doctor asked his father, "Shall I save the baby or the mother?" His father fainted.

Pforzheimer's father, an oil baron, was also named Walter Pforzheimer, and was one of three brothers in the oil business. All three of the brothers were also notable book collectors. Walter Sr. focused on French literature, while Carl built a well-known English literature collection, which is partially today at the New York Public Library, and at the University of Texas. Their other brother, Arthur, became a bookseller.

Having a childhood allowance of 50 cents a week, Pforzheimer began his own book collection purchasing first edition copies of his favorite author at the time, Frank R. Stockton. Due to his family's oil wealth, Pforzheimer was not personally financially impacted by the Great Depression, but witnessed many of its effects on his fellow citizens.

In 1931, when Pforzheimer was driven to Yale University by a Chauffeur, he wrote that he "took to Yale as a duck does to a pond." In 1934, Pforzheimer created Yale's first undergraduate book club. He earned his bachelor's degree from Yale in 1935, and entered into Yale Law School. In 1936, Pforzheimer became the youngest ever trustee of the Yale Library Associates. He participated in the Yale Debate Association and the Yale Political Union.

On his 21st birthday, Pforzheimer's father gifted him a library collection which included rare editions of Molière's works, French royal autographs, and books from the Ancien régime.

Pforzheimer, upon graduation, briefly worked in the business world.

== World War II ==
In 1942, immediately after completing Officer Candidate School for the United States Army, Pforzheimer was tapped for work in the Office of Strategic Services (OSS), and laundered money for the OSS through the Sterling Memorial Library. This operation was known as the "Yale Library Project."

Pforzheimer's first official posting was as an Air Intelligence Officer in the United States Army Air Forces. While deployed overseas at the American Army Air Force Intelligence Headquarters in England, he worked under various officers including Huntington “Ting” Sheldon and Lewis F. Powell (who later became a U.S. Supreme Court Justice). In 1945, he was in Berlin, where he earned a Bronze Star Medal, but perhaps more importantly, "liberated" books for his personal collection that had once belonged to Hitler.

== Legislative Counsel at Central Intelligence ==
In 1946, Pforzheimer joined the Central Intelligence Group (CIG), where he joined Larry Houston and John S. Warner, collectively called by employees of the CIA as "the in-house firm of Houston, Warner, and Pforzheimer," in drafting the legal framework for the creation of the Central Intelligence Agency (CIA). The three men each wrote large portions of the National Security Act of 1947, and it was Pforzheimer's job to get support for the new agency, and the bill, in the United States Congress.

For the first several years of the CIA's existence, representatives and senators usually trusted the word of the CIA, which did make Pforzheimer's job easier, but certain historians write that this might also have been because Pforzheimer was a genuinely jovial man who could charm anyone in Congress, which they write was indicative of his skill, and not the lack of a challenge.

During his time at CIG, Pforzheimer had to convince Congress that the group was legitimate, even though it had been established without a legislative charter. When CIG was merged into the CIA, Pforzheimer had to convince Congress to fund the new agency, even though it was running covert operations and budgets without legal authority. Houston, Warner, and Pforzheimer then got to work drafting large portions of the Central Intelligence Agency Act of 1949, which finally authorized funding for the CIA's covert activities. Pforzheimer, again, had the job of convincing Congress to ratify the bill into law.

According to the historian Britt L. Snider: "He monitored legislative developments, arranged for briefings and hearings, ensured that congressional requests were satisfied, and, above all, shepherded the agency's funding request through Congress each year."

In 1953, during the era of McCarthyism, Pforzheimer got caught in the middle of the very public fight between Allen Dulles and Senator Joseph McCarthy. While Larry Houston had repeatedly denied McCarthy any access whatsoever to CIA employees, Pforzheimer had to negotiate subpoenas for CIA employees to appear in congress, including a subpoena for William Bundy. The subpoena had come from Roy Cohn, McCarthy's aide. Pforzheimer arranged to have Bundy sent out of town, and then informed Cohn that Bundy hadn't come into work that day. However, Pforzheimer did not want to commit perjury over the arrangement, and refused to testify under oath.

== Historical Intelligence Collection ==
By 1956, Pforzheimer had realized that he hated being a lawyer, and he hated the law.

Dulles assigned him to develop the Historical Intelligence Collection, a role he held until his retirement in 1974. Pforzheimer's mandate was to develop a collection encompassing all aspects of intelligence operations and doctrine, providing a valuable resource for Agency personnel. Under Pforzheimer's leadership, the HIC expanded rapidly. In its inaugural year, the collection grew to include 3,570 volumes, with Pforzheimer personally acquiring 1,308 books during a European trip across ten countries, all for under $2,500. He defined the collection's scope to cover a wide range of topics, including military and national intelligence, espionage, counterespionage, unconventional warfare, cryptography, and various elements of intelligence tradecraft. This comprehensive approach ensured that the HIC became an unparalleled resource within the intelligence community.

When he retired, the HIC had grown to 22,000 volumes, the largest professional intelligence collection in the world. His efforts not only provided CIA officers with a rich repository of historical intelligence materials but also laid the foundation for ongoing scholarly research in the field. The Collection is now a part of the CIA Library.

== Retirement and rare book collecting ==
Even after retiring, he remained involved with the CIA, working to enhance its library and educating foreign military officers on intelligence history.

In 1981, Pforzheimer worked for the Presidential transition team of the Reagan Administration, and worked on matters relating to CIA reforms. The team's report on the CIA was considered so damning of the Carter Administration, that they only sent a single copy of the report to the White House.

Intelligence historians that Pforzheimer taught and cultivated as his protégés around this time include:

- Christopher Andrew
- John Costello
- David Kahn
- Dan Mulvenna
- Keith Melton
- Hayden Peake
- John Ranelagh
- Wesley Wark
- Nigel West

Pforzheimer's private intelligence collection contained rare artifacts, such as a visa issued to Mata Hari before her execution as a spy in 1917, a transcript from the trial of "John the Painter," an American convicted of sabotage during the Revolutionary War, and a 1699 memoir by spy Matthew Smith. His holdings included intelligence-related letters from figures like George Washington and Nathan Hale—documents the agency did not possess.

In 1994, for his 80th birthday, Festschrift titled "In the Name of Intelligence" was published, featuring contributions from leading intelligence historians such as Christopher Andrew, M. R. D. Foot, Nigel West, and Lord Dacre of Glanton.

Living at the Watergate complex in Washington, D.C., he kept one apartment for himself and another solely for his collection, even reinforcing the floors to support the weight of the books. He frequently hosted retired intelligence officers for discussions over Scotch. In 2002, he arranged for his collections to be transferred to Yale's Beinecke Library, though he insisted they remain with him until his passing, saying, "I go out the door feet first, then my library can go up to New Haven." The books were donated shortly before he died.
