= John H. Waller (CIA official) =

American historian (1923–2004)

John Waller

Inspector General of the Central Intelligence Agency
- In office July 1976 – January 1980
- President: Gerald Ford; Jimmy Carter
- Preceded by: Position established
- Succeeded by: Charles Briggs

Personal details
- Born: John Henry Waller; May 8, 1923 Paw Paw, Michigan, U.S.
- Died: November 4, 2004 (aged 81) Arlington, Virginia, U.S.
- Education: University of Michigan, Ann Arbor (BA)

John Henry Waller (May 8, 1923 – November 4, 2004) was an American historian and author, as well as the Inspector General of the Central Intelligence Agency from 1976 to 1980.

== Early life ==
Waller was born in Paw Paw, Michigan, to George and Marguerite (née Rowland) Waller on May 8, 1923. Raised in Detroit, he earned a B.A. from the University of Michigan in 1946, and married Barbara Steuart Hans the following year. The couple had three children.

== Career ==
In 1943 after he was rejected for military service due to an ear disorder, Waller began serving in the Office of Strategic Services, working in counterespionage. From 1947 to 1953, Waller served as vice-consul with the United States Foreign Service in Iran. He was a special assistant to the ambassador in New Delhi, India from 1955 to 1957 and from 1968 to 1971. Waller served in Khartoum, Sudan from 1960 to 1960, then as an analyst in the United States Department of State from 1962 to 1968. Waller was Chief of the CIA's Near East Division from 1971 to 1975, then Inspector General of the Agency from 1976 to 1980. During his career he was awarded the Distinguished Intelligence Medal and the National Civil Service Award.

During his tenure as Inspector General, Waller led the CIA's internal investigation of the arms for Libya case involving CIA agents Edwin P. Wilson and Frank E. Terpil. His report exonerated senior intelligence officials Theodore Shackley, deputy to the director of clandestine operations, and Thomas Clines, director of training in the clandestine services.

== Later life ==
Waller lived in McLean, Virginia from 1978. He retired as Inspector General of the CIA in 1980. During Lawrence Walsh's investigation of the Iran–Contra affair, Waller and four other former CIA officials served as trustees of a defense fund set-up to help pay the legal expenses of at least six individuals who were serving or had served with the CIA during the scandal.

In retirement, he was reported to have been a full-time writer. Among the books authored by Waller were Gordon of Khartoum: The Saga of a Victorian Hero (1988), Beyond the Khyber Pass: The Road to British Disaster in the First Afghan War (1990), The Unseen War in Europe: Espionage and Conspiracy in the Second World War (1996), and The Devil's Doctor: Felix Kersten and the Secret Plot to Turn Himmler Against Hitler (2002). He wrote Tibet: A Chronicle of Exploration under the pseudonym John MacGregor as well as A History of Sino-Indian Relations: Hostile Co-Existence under the pseudonym John Rowland.

On November 4, 2004, Waller died due to complications from pneumonia at the Virginia Hospital Center in Arlington, Virginia. He was survived by his wife and three children.
