= Intelligence literature =

Genre of literature involving espionage

Intelligence literature, sometimes referred to as espionage nonfiction, is a genre of non-fiction or historical literature, written in any language, that focuses on the intelligence field, and its most popular subfield known as espionage. This field of literature includes biographies and autobiographies of intelligence officers, historical research and analysis of intelligence operations and missions, studies of undercover work, policy and legal studies surrounding the fields of intelligence law, intelligence history, and national security law, academic and professional journals, essays, textbooks, and more. Other works of intelligence literature include official histories, official reports, tradecraft and technical manuals, declassified documents and archival materials, and oral histories and interviews.

"The literature of intelligence is rich and voluminous... The topic of intelligence has long captured the imagination of readers, in part because it has been sensationalized and made to sound more intriguing than it probably is in real life... Authors breathlessly await the declassification of government documents decades after a particularly nasty chapter of American history or, if they cannot wait, seek to obtain documents expeditiously through the Freedom of Information Act process."

— William C. Spracher, Teaching Intelligence in the United States, the United Kingdom, and Canada, https://doi.org/10.1093/acrefore/9780190846626.013.308

== The origins of intelligence literature ==
"Readers may be surprised to discover how much intelligence activity went on in the ancient world. Indeed, finding spies in the ancient authors is not nearly as difficult as tracking down some of the secondary literature. Articles and books on aspects of ancient intelligence activities have appeared all over the globe in more languages than one author could ever hope to read."

— Rose Mary Sheldon, Introduction, Espionage in the Ancient World

Intelligence literature is rooted in the original works of myth, folklore, oral tradition, political science and philosophy, as spycraft has always been a tool of statecraft, warfare, and diplomacy, and for the majority of its history, intelligence literature was wrapped-up into these genres. In ancient cultures, there often was no distinction between fiction and nonfiction. It took hundreds to thousands of years for it to become its own, unique, genre of literature.

=== Ancient Egypt ===
The Story of Wenamun is a Hieratic Late Egyptian literary text that focuses on Wenamun, a priest of Amun at Karnak, is sent by the High Priest of Amun Herihor on a secret mission to the Phoenician city of Byblos to acquire lumber (probably cedar wood) to build a new ship to transport the cult image of Amun. After visiting Smendes (Nesbanebded in Egyptian) at Tanis, Wenamun stopped at the port of Dor ruled by the Tjeker prince Beder, where he was robbed. Upon reaching Byblos, he was shocked by the hostile reception he received there. When he finally gained an audience with Zakar-Baal, the local king, the latter refused to give the requested goods for free, as had been the traditional custom, instead demanding payment. Wenamun had to send to Smendes for payment, a humiliating move that demonstrates the waning of Egyptian power over the Eastern Mediterranean; a causative factor of a new nature can be seen in this ebbing of Egyptian power — the rise of Assyria and its intrusion into Phoenicia around the year 1100 BCE. After a wait of almost a year at Byblos, Wenamun attempted to leave for Egypt, only to be blown off course to Alashiya (Cyprus), where he was almost killed by an angry mob before placing himself under the protection of the local queen, whom he called Hatbi. At this point the story breaks off.

=== Rome ===
Strategemata is a work by the Roman writer Frontinus, written in the 1st century, which focuses on military strategy, but does include discussions on deception and intelligence gathering. This book is more accurately defined as Military history, but includes within it sections on Intelligence history. The first section of this book is entitled "On Concealing One's Plans," and the second is entitled "On Discovering the Enemy's Plans," both of which are directly related to the fields of intelligence collection and counterintelligence.

=== India ===
Arthashastra (Sanskrit: अर्थशास्त्रम्, IAST: Kautiliyam Arthaśāstram) is an Ancient Indian Sanskrit treatise on statecraft, politics, economic policy and military strategy. The Arthashastra explores issues of social welfare, the collective ethics that hold a society together, advising the king that in times and in areas devastated by famine, epidemic and such acts of nature, or by war, he should initiate public projectssuch as creating irrigation waterways and building forts around major strategic holdings and towns and exempt taxes on those affected. The text was influenced by Hindu texts such as the sections on kings, governance and legal procedures included in Manusmriti.

=== China ===
In China, the author Sun Tzu is perhaps most well known for his seminal work, The Art of War. In the Art of War, Sun Tzu suggests tactics and strategies for spies, but in the broader conception of warfighting. The Art of War is an early inspiration for many intelligence officers and leaders of intelligence agencies, but it is not, on its own, a work of intelligence literature.

=== The Crusades ===
During the Crusades, the Knights Templar, which was engaged in espionage activities in the Holy Land, might have published manuals on clandestine activities. However, after the Templar Order was disbanded in 1312 by Pope Clement V, many of their records were seized or destroyed. Some theorists speculate that if the Templars had intelligence manuals, they were either lost or kept secret by successor groups (e.g., the Freemasons or other knightly orders).

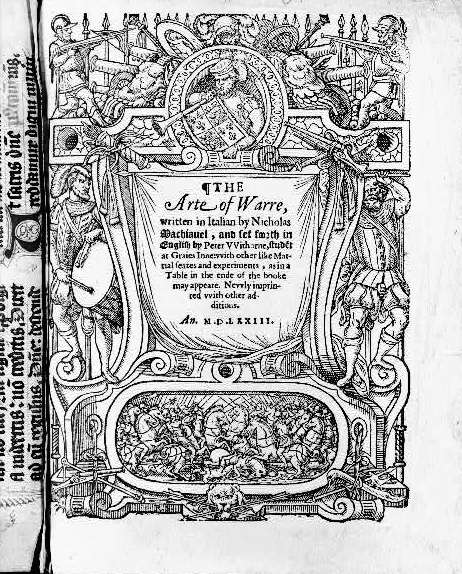
Peter Withorne's 1573 translation of The Art of War

=== The Renaissance: Raison d’état ===
Italian writers in the 1500s, such as Niccolò Machiavelli, Giovanni Botero, and Giovan Battista Possevino (Giovan's French Wikipedia article) published many treatises and manuals for statecraft, which did include literature surrounding the intelligence field, but might not be considered works of intelligence literature, but still bound in political science and philosophy.

Perhaps the most persistent author of this period is Machiavelli, with his collection of works including The Prince and The Art of War, both of which have inspired generations of diplomats, politicians, and spies. The Prince, upon its release, shocked the readers of Europe because it presented a moral case for ill deeds in the time of war. Scholars often note that Machiavelli glorifies instrumentality in state building, an approach embodied by the saying, often attributed to interpretations of The Prince, "The ends justify the means". Fraud and deceit are held by Machiavelli as necessary for a prince to use.

== Memoir and autobiography ==
=== The first known intelligence memoir (in English) ===
Memoirs of Secret Service

The first officially recognized, but not widely known, memoir in intelligence literature was Memoirs of Secret Service: , written by Matthew Smith in the 17th century. Prior to this, intelligence officers did not share their secrets – but Smith submitted his manuscript to the House of Commons of the United Kingdom in order to defend himself against accusations that he had been incompetent and in league with Jacobites. in which he had been called to testify in front of the House of Lords. In his memoir, he accused Charles Talbot, 1st Duke of Shrewsbury and his aide, James Vernon, of having been involved in a Jacobite assassination attempt. He opens his memoir with the following words:

"It is not without the last reluctancy, that I resolve to publish these papers, or rather should have said, I am oblig'd to it by the utmost Necessity. It may happen to many to have their services not rewarded; but my case is particular, who am reduced to the unhappy necessity of defending them."

— Matthew Smith

The book's bold accusations generated public interest and was even translated, but Parliament largely ignored it. In November 1699, Smith intensified his claims against the Earl of Shrewsbury in Remarks upon the D— of S—'s Letter to the House of Lords, which led to his brief imprisonment for breaching parliamentary privilege and the public burning of the pamphlet.

Despite setbacks, Smith continued publishing attacks, responding to Kingston's pamphlet with A Reply to an Unjust and Scandalous Libel in 1700. After William III’s death, he wrote a petition accusing Shrewsbury and James Vernon of treason and alleging that the late king had bribed MPs. However, fearing poor timing after William Fuller’s recent exposure as a fraud, he hesitated before submitting it to Speaker Robert Harley in March 1702. Harley ignored the claims, and with Shrewsbury overseas and Vernon out of office, the accusations faded. Smith’s fortunes later changed in 1703 when he was appointed judge-advocate of Jamaica, likely through the influence of the earl of Peterborough. However, little is known of his later years, and he is believed to have died before 1723.

=== Memoirs of the Secret Service of John Macky ===
John Macky (died 1726) was a Scottish spy and travel writer. Between 1688 and 1710 he ran a successful intelligence gathering network across the English Channel, principally concerned with Jacobite and French threats to England. He was also the author of several publications which reflected his travel, political outlook and access to leading figures of the period. Memoirs of the Secret Services of John Macky (1733) is a firsthand account of his espionage and political intelligence gathering activities during the late 17th and early 18th centuries.

Macky, even though he was Scottish, provided intelligence to the English government about Jacobite activities and French military movements. His memoirs detail his observations and experiences during the reigns of William III and Queen Anne, offering insight into diplomatic maneuvering, spy networks, and court intrigues. His work provides an early example of structured intelligence reporting, reflecting the growing professionalization of espionage in Britain. The text also serves as an important primary source for researchers studying Jacobitism, Anglo-French relations, and the broader development of intelligence operations in early modern Europe. Despite its contested reliability, Memoirs of the Secret Services remains an essential reference in the history of espionage.

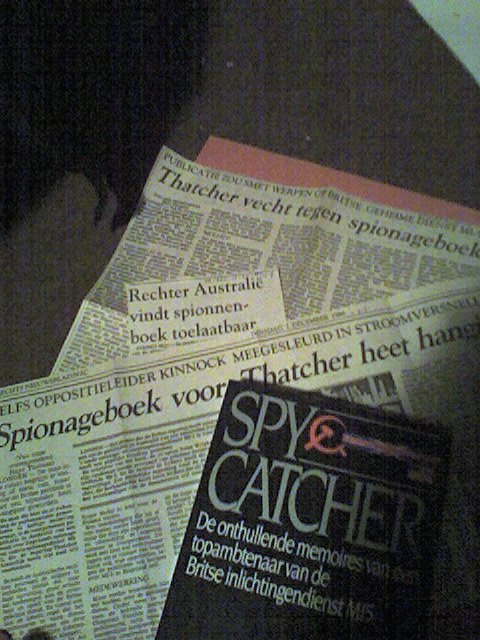
Dutch headlines about Peter Wright's "Spycatcher"

=== The Spycatcher Affair ===
The most famous controversial memoir in intelligence literature is likely Spycatcher: the Candid Autobiography of a Senior Intelligence Officer, by the British spy Peter Wright. This book caused a great controversy in the United Kingdom when it was released, as it detailed aspects of the intelligence field in the era of the Cambridge Five that were damaging to the British government.

In this memoir, Wright alleges the presence of a Soviet mole within MI5, specifically accusing former Director-General Sir Roger Hollis. The book also delves into various covert operations and internal dynamics of British intelligence. Upon its release in 1987, the British government sought to suppress its distribution, leading to legal battles and debates over press freedom.

Recent revelations have shed light on the British government's internal handling of the affair. Declassified documents indicate that Prime Minister Margaret Thatcher approved the controlled leak of information regarding the suspected mole, Sir Roger Hollis, to journalist Chapman Pincher. This strategic leak aimed to manage public perception and preempt the disclosures in Wright's forthcoming book. Additionally, these documents reveal that Cabinet Secretary Robert Armstrong provided misleading testimony during the Spycatcher trial, denying the orchestrated leak under oath.

The government's attempts to suppress Spycatcher inadvertently amplified its notoriety. While the book was banned in England, it remained available in other regions, including Scotland and Australia, leading to widespread public interest and debate. The affair not only highlighted internal tensions within British intelligence but also sparked discussions on press freedom, governmental transparency, and the public's right to information.

== Academic literature ==
=== Intelligence studies ===
Intelligence Studies is an interdisciplinary academic field that concerns intelligence assessment and intelligence analysis. Intelligence has been referred to as the "lost dimension" of the fields of international relations (IR) and diplomatic history, as the secretive nature of the subject means most intelligence successes are unknown. Intelligence studies comprise a small but major component of intelligence literature.

=== Security studies ===
Security studies, also known as international security studies, is an academic sub-field within the wider discipline of international relations that studies organized violence, military conflict, national security, and international security.

=== Journals in intelligence ===
- National Security Law Journal
- Intelligence (journal)
- Political Science Quarterly
- Small Wars Journal
- Studies in Intelligence
- Periscope (discontinued)
- Intelligencer Journal
- American Intelligence Journal
- Intelligence Report
- Foreign Intelligence Literary Scene

== Intelligence literature curation and intelligence collections ==
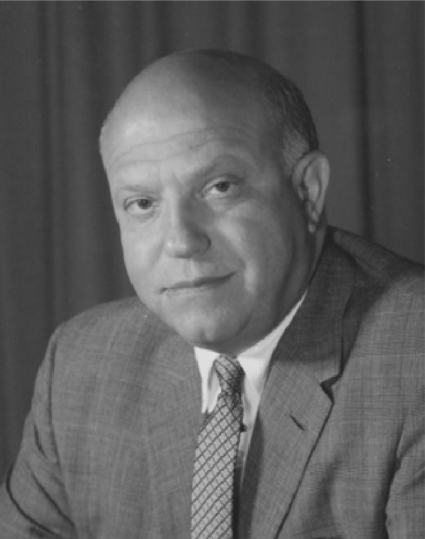
Walter Pforzheimer was known as the "Dean of Intelligence Literature." He curated hundreds of thousands of books.

The largest collection of intelligence history remains the Intelligence History Collection (IHC), which is housed in the CIA Library, containing over 23,000 volumes. This collection was mostly gathered by Walter Pforzheimer, who was often referred to by his honorific title in the intelligence world as "The Dean of Intelligence Literature."

In 1954, Pforzheimer was assigned by Allen Dulles to develop the Historical Intelligence Collection, a role he held until his retirement in 1974. Pforzheimer's mandate was to develop a collection encompassing all aspects of intelligence operations and doctrine, providing a valuable resource for Agency personnel. Under Pforzheimer's leadership, the HIC expanded rapidly. In its inaugural year, the collection grew to include 3,570 volumes, with Pforzheimer personally acquiring 1,308 books during a European trip across ten countries, all for under $2,500. He defined the collection's scope to cover a wide range of topics, including military and national intelligence, espionage, counterespionage, unconventional warfare, cryptography, and various elements of intelligence tradecraft. This comprehensive approach ensured that the HIC became an unparalleled resource within the intelligence community.

When he retired, the HIC had grown to 22,000 volumes, the largest professional intelligence collection in the world. His efforts not only provided CIA officers with a rich repository of historical intelligence materials but also laid the foundation for ongoing scholarly research in the field. The Collection is now a part of the CIA Library.

== Writers on World War II: 1939–1945 ==
| Author(s) | Title | Publisher | Date | Notes |
|---|---|---|---|---|
| Mashbir, Sidney | I Was an American Spy: published 1953, republished as 65th Anniversary Edition in 2019 | Horizon Productions | 1953, republished 2019 | American intelligence agent who played a significant role in both WWI and WWII. Colonel Mashbir is included in the Army Intelligence Corps Hall of Fame. He is a pioneer of military intelligence and is one of two men who first created the framework for the C.I.A. |
| Babington-Smith, Constance | Air Spy: The Story of Photo Intelligence in World War II | | 1957 | |
| Berg, Moe | The Catcher Was a Spy: The Mysterious Life of Moe Berg | Vintage Books | 1994 | — Major league baseball player and OSS Secret Intelligence (SI) spy in Yugoslavia |
| Bryden, John | Best-Kept Secret: Canadian Secret Intelligence in the Second World War | Lester | 1993 | — |
| Doundoulakis, Helias | Trained to be an OSS Spy | Xlibris | 2014 | OSS Secret Intelligence (SI) spy in Greece |
| Hall, Virginia | The Spy with the Wooden Leg: The Story of Virginia Hall | Alma Little | 2012 | SOE and OSS spy in France |
| Hinsley, F. H.and Alan Stripp | Codebreakers: The Inside Story of Bletchley Park | — | 2001 | — |
| Hinsley, F. H. | British Intelligence in the Second World War | — | 1996 | Abridged version of multivolume official history. |
| Hohne, Heinz | Canaris: Hitler's Master Spy | — | 1979 | — |
| Jones, R. V. | The Wizard War: British Scientific Intelligence 1939–1945 | — | 1978 | — |
| Kahn, David | Hitler's Spies: German Military Intelligence in World War II | — | 1978 | — |
| Kahn, David | Seizing the Enigma: The Race to Break the German U-Boat Codes, 1939–1943 | — | 1991 | FACE |
| Kitson, Simon | The Hunt for Nazi Spies: Fighting Espionage in Vichy France | — | 2008 | |
| Leigh Fermor, Patrick | Abducting a General: The Kreipe Operation in Crete | New York Review Books | 2015 | SOE spy who abducted General Kreipe from Crete |
| Lewin, Ronald | The American Magic: Codes, Ciphers and the Defeat of Japan | — | 1982 | — |
| Masterman, J. C. | The Double-Cross System in the War of 1935 to 1945 | Yale | 1972 | — |
| Persico, Joseph | Roosevelt's Secret War: FDR and World War II Espionage | — | 2001 | — |
| Persico, Joseph | Casey: The Lives and Secrets of William J. Casey-From the OSS to the CIA | — | 1991 | — |
| Pinck, Dan | Journey to Peking: A Secret Agent in Wartime China | US Naval Institute Press | 2003 | OSS Secret Intelligence (SI) spy in Hong Kong, China, during WWII |
| Ronnie, Art | Counterfeit Hero: Fritz Duquesne, Adventurer and Spy | — | 1995 | ISBN 1-55750-733-3 |
| Sayers, Michael & Albert E. Kahn | Sabotage! The Secret War Against America | — | 1942 | — |
| Smith, Richard Harris | OSS: The Secret History of America's First Central Intelligence Agency | — | 2005 | — |
| Stanley, Roy M. | World War II Photo Intelligence | — | 1981 | — |
| Wark, Wesley | The Ultimate Enemy: British Intelligence and Nazi Germany, 1933–1939 | — | 1985 | — |
| Wark, Wesley | "Cryptographic Innocence: The Origins of Signals Intelligence in Canada in the Second World War" in Journal of Contemporary History 22 | — | 1987 | — |
| West, Nigel | Secret War: The Story of SOE, Britain's Wartime Sabotage Organization | — | 1992 | — |
| Winterbotham, F. W. | The Ultra Secret | Harper & Row | 1974 | — |
| Winterbotham, F. W. | The Nazi Connection | Harper & Row | 1978 | — |
| Cowburn, B. | No Cloak No Dagger | Brown Watson, Ltd. | 1960 | — |
| Wohlstetter, Roberta | Pearl Harbor: Warning and Decision | — | 1962 | — |

== Writers on Cold War era: 1945–1991 ==
| Author(s) | Title | Publisher | Date | Notes |
|---|---|---|---|---|
| Ambrose, Stephen E. | Ike's Spies: Eisenhower and the Intelligence Establishment | — | 1981– | — |
| Andrew, Christopher and Vasili Mitrokhin | The Sword and the Shield: The Mitrokhin Archive and the Secret History of the KGB | Basic Books | 1991, 2005 | ISBN 0-465-00311-7 |
| Andrew, Christopher, and Oleg Gordievsky | KGB: The Inside Story of Its Foreign Operations from Lenin to Gorbachev | — | 1990 | — |
| Aronoff, Myron J. | The Spy Novels of John Le Carré: Balancing Ethics and Politics | — | 1999 | — |
| Bissell, Richard | Reflections of a Cold Warrior: From Yalta to the Bay of Pigs | — | 1996 | — |
| Bogle, Lori, ed. | Cold War Espionage and Spying | — | 2001– | essays |
| Christopher Andrew and Vasili Mitrokhin | The World Was Going Our Way: The KGB and the Battle for the Third World | — | — | — |
| Christopher Andrew and Vasili Mitrokhin | The Mitrokhin Archive: The KGB in Europe and the West | Gardners Books | 2000 | ISBN 978-0-14-028487-4 |
| Colella, Jim | My Life as an Italian Mafioso Spy | — | 2000 | — |
| Craig, R. Bruce | Treasonable Doubt: The Harry Dexter Spy Case | University Press of Kansas | 2004 | ISBN 978-0-7006-1311-3 |
| Dorril, Stephen | MI6: Inside the Covert World of Her Majesty's Secret Intelligence Service | — | 2000 | — |
| Dziak, John J. | Chekisty: A History of the KGB | — | 1988 | — |
| Gates, Robert M. | From The Shadows: The Ultimate Insider's Story of Five Presidents And How They Won The Cold War | — | 1997 | — |
| Frost, Mike and Michel Gratton | Spyworld: Inside the Canadian and American Intelligence Establishments | Doubleday Canada | 1994 | — |
| Haynes, John Earl, and Harvey Klehr | Venona: Decoding Soviet Espionage in America | — | 1999 | — |
| Helms, Richard | A Look over My Shoulder: A Life in the Central Intelligence Agency | — | 2003 | — |
| Koehler, John O. | Stasi: The Untold Story of the East German Secret Police | — | 1999 | — |
| Persico, Joseph | Casey: The Lives and Secrets of William J. Casey-From the OSS to the CIA | — | 1991 | — |
| Murphy, David E., Sergei A. Kondrashev, and George Bailey | Battleground Berlin: CIA vs. KGB in the Cold War | — | 1997 | — |
| Prados, John | Presidents' Secret Wars: CIA and Pentagon Covert Operations Since World War II | — | 1996 | — |
| Rositzke, Harry. | The CIA's Secret Operations: Espionage, Counterespionage, and Covert Action | — | 1988 | — |
| Srodes, James | Allen Dulles: Master of Spies | Regnery | 2000 | CIA head to 1961 |
| Sontag Sherry, and Christopher Drew | Blind Man's Bluff: The Untold Story of American Submarine Espionage | Harper | 1998 | — |
| | Encyclopedia of Cold War Espionage, Spies and Secret Operations | Greenwood Press | 2004 | — |
| Anderson, Nicholas | NOC | Enigma Books | 2009 | |
| Ishmael Jones | he Human Factor: Inside the CIA's Dysfunctional Intelligence Culture | T Encounter Books | 2008, rev. 2010 | |

=== Writers of other nationalities ===
- Jean-Marie Thiébaud, Dictionnaire Encyclopédique International des Abréviations, Singles et Acronyms, Armée et armament, Gendarmerie, Police, Services de renseignement et Services secrets français et étrangers, Espionage, Counterespionage, Services de Secours, Organisations révolutionnaires et terrorists, Paris, L'Harmattan, 2015, 827 pFrench journalist Gérard de Villiers began to write his SAS series in 1965. The franchise now extends to 200 titles and 150 million books.
- Julian Semyonov was an influential spy novelist, writing in the Eastern Bloc, whose range of novels and novel series featured a White Russian spy in the USSR; Max Otto von Stierlitz, a Soviet mole in the Nazi High Command, and Felix Dzerzhinsky, founder of the Cheka. In his novels, Semyonov covered much Soviet intelligence history, ranging from the Russian Civil War (1917–1923), through the Great Patriotic War (1941–45), to the Russo–American Cold War (1945–91).
- Swedish author Jan Guillou also began to write his Coq Rouge series, featuring Swedish spy Carl Hamilton, during this period, beginning in 1986.
