= CIA's relationship with the United States Congress =

There have been various arrangements to handle the Central Intelligence Agency's relationship with the United States Congress.

The formal liaison began some time before the 1960s, with a single position named the 'legislative liaison'. This later became the 'legislative counsel'. In the 1960s, an actual office was created for this purpose - the Office of Legislative Counsel.

In the 1970s, the Central Intelligence Agency (CIA) ramped up its congressional-liaison staff to deal with the large number of investigations coming from the Congress. It was the era of the Rockefeller Commission, the Church Committee, and the Pike Committee, all of which requested large amounts of information from the agency.

In the 1980s, there were several reorganizations and renaming of the office. Near the end of the 1980s, the office was renamed the Office of Congressional Affairs and has kept that name, as of 2009.

In the early 2000s, the relationship became more intense, with debates about the Global war on terror and controversies surrounding it. For example, the CIA planned a secret program in 2001 but did not inform congress until much later.

== Timeline ==
The following account is based on information found in Snider, ''The Agency and the Hill'', Chapter 4 (available online; see below under 'External links'). It covers the heads of the liaison office along with significant events, reorganizations, and name changes.

From 1946, the CIA maintained a single liaison person within the Office of General Counsel (OGC). Walter Pforzheimer held this role from 1946 to 1955, followed by Norman Paul from 1956 to 1957, and then John S. Warner from 1957 to 1966.

In 1966, a dedicated office was established the Office of Legislative Counsel (OLC). John Warner led it from 1966 to 1968, succeeded by John M. Maury from 1968 to 1974, and then George Lee Cary (not to be confused with George Gibson Carey) from 1974 to 1977.

During the 1970s, an 'ad hoc Review Staff' operated alongside the OLC to respond to the large number of congressional inquiries arising from the Rockefeller Commission, the Church Committee, and the Pike Committee. By 1978 the OLC had grown to 28 people, with Fred Hitz serving as its head from 1978 to 1981.

In 1981, the OLC and the Office of Public Affairs were combined into the Office of External Affairs, which included a 'Legislative Liaison Division'. J. William "Billy" Doswell led this division from 1981 to 1982. The Office of External Affairs was dissolved in 1982, and the Office of Legislative Liaison was created in its place. Clair E. George directed it from 1982 to 1984, followed by Charles Ackerly Briggs from 1984 to 1986, and David D. Gries from 1986 to 1988.

During the 1980s, the Iran–Contra affair brought the Democratic-controlled United States House of Representatives into conflict with the Reagan Doctrine as carried out by the CIA in Central America, ultimately leading to a number of prosecutions and the cutting of congressional funding to the CIA's Contra program.

At some point in the late 1980s, the Office of Legislative Liaison was renamed the Office of Congressional Affairs (OCA). John Helgerson served as its head from 1988 to 1989, followed by E. Norbert Garrett from 1989 to 1991, Stan Moskowitz from 1991 to 1994, Joanne Isham from 1994 to 1996, John H. Moseman from 1996 to 2001, and Stan Moskowitz again from 2001 to 2004.

== 1980s and Charlie Wilson ==
During much of the 1980s a unique and unusual relationship evolved between Congress and the CIA in the person of Texas congressman Charlie Wilson from Texas's 2nd congressional district. Using his position on various House appropriations committees, and in partnership with CIA agent Gust Avrakotos, Wilson was able to increase CIA's funding the Afghan Mujahideen to several hundred million dollars a year during the Soviet–Afghan War. Author George Crile would describe Wilson as eventually becoming the "Agency's station chief on the Hill". He eventually got a position on the Intelligence Committee and was supposed to be overseeing the CIA.

== See also ==
- CIA's relationship with the United States Military
- Central Intelligence Agency Office of Inspector General
- General Counsel of the Central Intelligence Agency
