= Charles Ackerly Briggs =

High ranking CIA officer

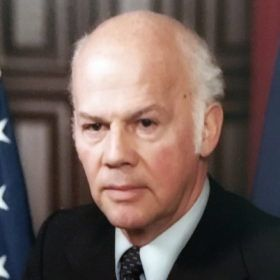

Executive Director of the Central Intelligence Agency

Acting Director of Central Intelligence

Acting Deputy Director of Central Intelligence

Legislative Liaison of the Central Intelligence Agency
- In office 1984–1986

Personal details
- Born: August 1, 1926 Erie, Pennsylvania
- Died: November 4, 2015 (aged 89) Vienna, Virginia
- Spouse: Catherine Murphy Briggs
- Education: Wesleyan University; University of Michigan

Charles "Chuck" Ackerly Briggs (born August 1, 1926, in Erie, Pennsylvania) was an officer in the Central Intelligence Agency (CIA) for over 34 years.

== Life ==
After serving as a Corporal in the U.S. Army during World War II, he pursued higher education at Wesleyan University, where he was an active member of Alpha Delta Phi. In 1951, he earned a Masters's degree in english literature from the University of Michigan.

Briggs joined the Central Intelligence Agency (CIA) in September 1952 as a Junior Officer Trainee and advanced through various administrative roles, including Inspector General, Comptroller, Director of the Services Staff, Legislative Liaison, and ultimately Executive Director. Notably, in June 1983, while serving as Executive Director, he was briefly designated as both Acting Director of Central Intelligence (DCI) and Acting Deputy Director of Central Intelligence (DDCI), holding all three positions simultaneously.

During his tenure, Briggs was involved in the case of former CIA operative Edwin Wilson, who was convicted in 1983 of selling explosives to Libya. Briggs provided an affidavit stating that the CIA had not engaged Wilson for any services, directly or indirectly. However, upon appeal, evidence surfaced indicating that Wilson had maintained ties with the agency on at least 40 occasions post-retirement. In 2003, federal Judge Lynn Hughes overturned Wilson's conviction, citing the affidavit as "dishonest."

After retiring from the CIA, Briggs contributed to the development of the Sixth Floor Museum at Dealey Plaza in Dallas, Texas, which commemorates President John F. Kennedy's assassination. He worked part-time for about a year in the late 1980s as a researcher and writer in the Washington, D.C. in the offices of museum exhibition designers Bob Staples and Barbara Charles.
