= Rheanne Wirkkala =

American defense policy advisor

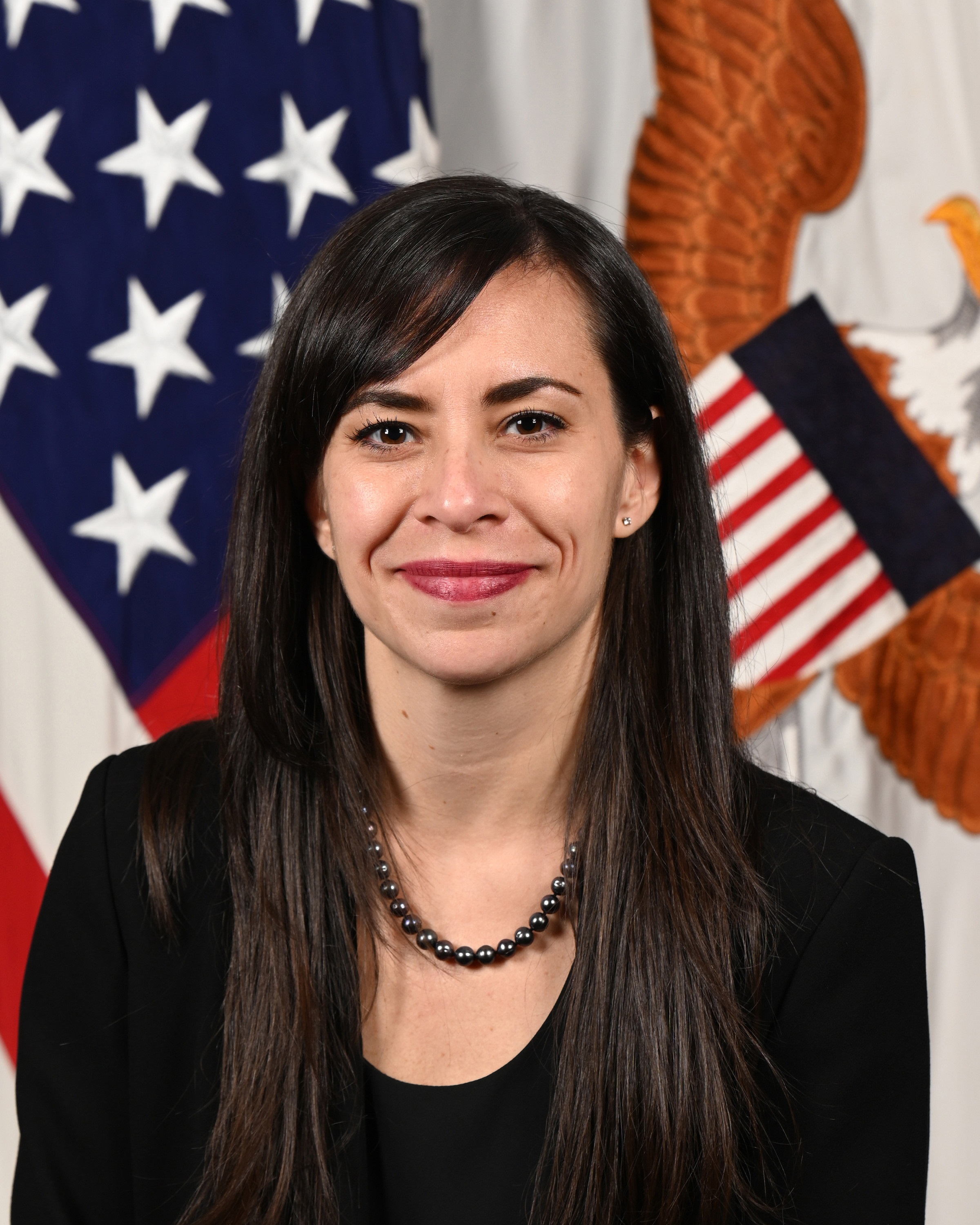

Assistant Secretary of Defense for Legislative Affairs
- In office December 2, 2022 – January 20, 2025
- President: Joe Biden
- Preceded by: Robert R. Hood
- Succeeded by: Dane Hughes

Personal details
- Spouse: Ian Duncan (m. 2013)
- Children: 2
- Education: Boston University (BA); Yale University (MA)

Rheanne Wirkkala is an American defense policy advisor and former intelligence analyst who had served the Assistant Secretary of Defense for Legislative Affairs in the Biden administration.

== Education ==
Wirkkala graduated from Henry M. Jackson High School in Mill Creek, Washington. She earned a Bachelor of Arts degree in political science and philosophy from Boston University and a Master of Arts in international relations from Yale University.

== Career ==
As a graduate student, was an intern for the Global Strategy Group and Bureau of Economic and Business Affairs. She later worked as a consultant for Burson Cohn & Wolfe. From 2012 to 2015, she was an intelligence analyst for the Defense Intelligence Agency, focused on political and military leadership in Pakistan and Afghanistan. From 2015 to 2020, she served as an advisor, deputy director, and director for the United States House Permanent Select Committee on Intelligence. In February 2021, she became a special assistant to Defense Secretary Lloyd Austin.

=== Biden administration ===
On March 11, 2022, President Joe Biden nominated Wirkkala to be an assistant secretary of defense for legislative affairs. The Senate confirmed her on November 17.

== Personal life ==
Wirkkala is married to Ian Duncan, a transportation reporter for The Washington Post. They have two children and live in Maryland.

== See also ==
- Department of Defense appointments by Joe Biden
