= J. William Doswell =

American intelligence officer (1927-2020)

Chief of the Office of External Affairs
- In office 1981–1982
- Appointed by: William J. Casey
- Simultaneous position: Legislative Liaison of the Central Intelligence Agency
- Preceded by: Frederick Hitz
- Succeeded by: Clair George

Personal details
- Born: January 13, 1927 Richmond, Virginia
- Died: August 22, 2020 (aged 93) Richmond, Virginia
- Education: Washington and Lee University

Military service
- Branch/service: United States Marine Corps
- Battles/wars: World War II

John William "Billy" Doswell was an American journalist, lobbyist, and intelligence professional. He graduated from Thomas Jefferson High School and served in the U.S. Marine Corps during the final months of World War II.

His life as a journalist included stints at the Richmond Times-Dispatch and the Richmond News Leader. For over 20 years, he worked in public relations and as a government affairs consultant in Richmond and would often be seen at the Virginia General Assembly.

In 1981, the Director of Central Intelligence, William J. Casey appointed Doswell as the Director of the Office of External Affairs. Upon receiving the job, the director told him "Billy, we're going to be a no-profile agency." In this role, Doswell oversaw the Central Intelligence Agency's (CIA) interactions with Congress, the media, and the public, simultaneously serving as the Legislative Liaison.
