= Doswell =

Doswell is a surname. Notable people with the surname include:

- Charles A. Doswell III (1945–2025), American meteorologist and thunderstorm researcher
- J. William Doswell (1927–2020), American journalist, lobbyist, and intelligence professional
- Kittie Doswell (1939–2011), American R&B, soul, and jazz vocalist

== See also ==
- Doswell, Virginia, unincorporated community
- Doswell Formation
