= Janine Brookner =

American lawyer and CIA officer (1940–2021)

- Born: Janine Marilyn Okun; December 26, 1940; Syracuse, New York, US
- Died: May 11, 2021 (aged 80); Washington, D.C., US
- Education: Russell Sage College; New York University; George Washington University Law School
- Espionage activity
- Country: United States
- Agency: CIA
- Service years: 1968–1994

Janine Marilyn Brookner (née Okun; December 26, 1940 – May 11, 2021) was an American lawyer and Central Intelligence Agency (CIA) officer. She became the first female CIA station chief in Latin America when she took over the Jamaica station in 1989. She was falsely accused of professional misconduct in 1992 by her superiors at the CIA and after being threatened with a demotion and criminal sanctions, she sued the agency. In 1994, she became the first person to successfully sue the agency for sexual discrimination. She became a lawyer in 1998, specializing in sex discrimination cases against the federal government.

== Early life ==
Janine Okun was born on December 26, 1940, in Syracuse, New York. Her mother, Lillian Okun (née Mogilesky), was a real estate agent and her father, Philip Okun, was a union official and distributor for The Post-Standard. Shortly after graduating from high school, she married Howard Brookner. She initially attended Syracuse University before transferring to Russell Sage College, where she graduated in 1964. While in college, she had her first son, Steven, and divorced her husband when she was 22. She continued to use her married name even after the divorce. She graduated from New York University in 1968 with a master's degree in Russian studies. While attending the university, one of her professors suggested that she apply for a job in the Central Intelligence Agency (CIA).

== CIA career ==
Brookner joined the CIA's training program in 1968 as one of six women in a total class of sixty-six. She trained at The Farm, where her instructors recommended that she work as an analyst. Instead, she took a position as a case officer for the Directorate of Operations and in March 1969, she was sent to Manila, Philippines. While there, she met Colin Thompson, a fellow case officer, and was later described by the station chief, George Kalaris, as one of the best officers. She recruited informants and infiltrated the Philippines Communist Party. In 1972, she was transferred to Thailand. While there, she married Thompson in Bangkok the following year. She was then sent to Caracas, Venezuela, for three years where she served as acting deputy chief of station. In 1979, Brookner and Thompson divorced.

In the 1980s, Brookner was sent to Manhattan where she was appointed as the CIA division chief for the United Nations. She was responsible for contacting diplomats from the Soviet Union, recruiting them to work for the United States government, and surveilling other Communist delegations. While in this assignment, she reported a fellow CIA officer, Aldrich Ames, to her superiors because she believed that he was a security risk but no action was taken at the time.

Brookner moved back to CIA headquarters at Langley, Virginia, and in 1988, the Head of Latin American Operations, Jerry Gruner, offered her a position as chief of station for Jamaica. She was tasked with finding a deputy and chose Gerald P. Hamilton, an officer in the Caribbean branch. In July 1989, she became the first female station chief in Latin America when she arrived in Kingston, Jamaica.

Brookner faced several internal problems while in this position. A case officer, Jayna Hill, got drunk at a party that was attended by Vice President Dan Quayle and said publicly that she was employed by the CIA. Brookner was informed of this incident by two National Security Agency officers and after further issues where Hill acted increasingly erratically, Brookner informed officials at Langley who ordered a psychiatric evaluation. In September 1990, she received a call from the wife of her deputy chief of station who confided that Hamilton was abusive to her and Brookner again alerted Langley. Another colleague, Bob Emerton, had previously sexually assaulted Brookner's daughter-in-law at a Christmas party and was privately warned off by Brookner. However, in March 1991 she was told by Ambassador Glen Holden that Emerton had threatened to kill his security guards and it was agreed that he would receive a psychiatric evaluation. Brookner also had confrontations with two other officers, Jack Spears and Tom Meehan.

== Professional misconduct investigation ==
In summer 1991, Brookner moved back to Langley to take a job in the Soviet Division. Milton Bearden appointed her deputy group chief for Eastern Europe and teased the possibility of a position as station chief of Prague. However, in November, a secret investigation into Brookner was opened by Frederick Hitz, the CIA's Inspector General. The investigation was conducted by Carter Shannon and supervised by Rick Cinquegrana and Bertram Dunn. In February 1992, Brookner was still not aware of the investigation, but she was informed by an internal directory that she had been demoted to chief of the Czech branch.

In May 1992, Brookner was finally informed by Shannon that an investigation was ongoing. Brookner told the investigators that the accusations were likely coming from her former colleagues at the Jamaica station whom she had previously disciplined but the investigation continued to proceed. While the investigation was underway, Brookner was moved to a desk job in Langley. In July, Shannon told her that she could face criminal sanctions for "excessive overtime claims and conversion of government property". The Inspector General's report was published in January 1993 and accused Brookner of being a "boozy provocateur" who wore improper clothing and made sexual advances on her male subordinates. The report also referred two incidents to the Department of Justice for prosecution, alleging that the government had been defrauded. The first charge referred to Brookner claiming overtime for the preparation of a Thanksgiving dinner for local contacts in 1989 and the second alleged that she used a government helicopter for a picnic on Lime Cay.

=== Lawsuit ===
Brookner hired Victoria Toensing to dispute the charges, but when the CIA failed to respond, they decided to sue for sex discrimination under the Civil Rights Act of 1964. The complaint was filed on July 14, 1994, and listed CIA Director R. James Woolsey, Hitz, Dunn, and the five employees who had been disciplined in Jamaica as defendants. The court filings included contradictions of all allegations against Brookner but the agency had classified the majority of the documents pertinent to the case, including personnel files. In the lawsuit, Brookner was referred to as Jane Doe Thompson. However that September, The New York Times published her name in a front-page article by Tim Weiner.

On November 10, Toensing met with the defense attorney for the CIA, John A. Rogovin, and learned that there was an additional accusation that Brookner had sexually harassed a subordinate. The Justice Department initially refused to give a name but when Toensing realized they were not talking about a subordinate but instead the Drug Enforcement Administration's agent in Jamaica, Steve Widener, the Justice Department lawyers confirmed this. Widener agreed to sign an affidavit stating that Brookner had not sexually harassed him. On December 6, the case was settled and the CIA offered Brookner $410,000 (equivalent to $890,604 in 2025). She was the first person to have successfully sued the agency for sexual discrimination.

As part of the settlement, Brookner resigned her position at the CIA on December 23, 1994, but was required to maintain her undercover status during retirement. This meant she was barred from discussing her previous career with the agency or the circumstances surrounding her case. In exchange, the CIA promised to write her a letter of recommendation, but it was placed in her classified personnel file and was therefore inaccessible to future employers.

=== Later actions ===
On July 13, 1995, Brookner wrote to the Attorney General, Janet Reno, recommending that a criminal investigation be launched against her accusers for perjury. No charges were brought but on March 22, 1996, she appeared on ABC News Nightline alongside former CIA officials, Robert Gates, Thomas Twetten, and Milton Bearden, all of whom condemned the agency's treatment of her. Hitz was subsequently investigated in 1997 by the President's Council on Integrity and Efficiency for his part in the investigation, which found issues with the way he had handled the case.

== Legal career ==
After resigning from the CIA, Brookner enrolled in night classes at George Washington University Law School and graduated in 1998. She had intended to work on domestic violence cases but received an influx of calls from women who needed help with employment law cases involving sex discrimination and whistle-blowing in the government. She became known for this type of work and represented a number of former CIA, Drug Enforcement Administration, State Department, and other federal employees in their cases against their former agencies.

Her clients included Bonnie Hanssen, wife of Robert Hanssen, an FBI agent who was convicted of spying for Russia. Brookner proved that his wife did not know about his activities and ensured that she received the pension benefits to which she was entitled. She defended James Peterson and Patrick McHale, two federal meat inspectors with the Department of Agriculture who were fired after reporting their colleagues for bribery and misconduct. She also represented embassy officials who became victims of Havana syndrome. Brookner published a book in 2004 titled Piercing the Veil of Secrecy which was an instruction manual on how to beat the CIA and other federal agencies in court.

== Death ==
Brookner died on May 11, 2021, in Washington, D.C., from complications due to liver disease and cancer.
