= John M. Maury =

American intelligence officer and diplomat

Special Assistant to the Director of Central Intelligence
- In office 1952

Chief of Soviet Operations at the Central Intelligence Agency
- In office 1962–1954

Chief of Station at Athens for the Central Intelligence Agency
- In office 1962–1968

Legislative Counsel of the Central Intelligence Agency
- In office 1968–1974

Assistant Secretary of State for Legislative Affairs
- In office April 12, 1974 – February 28, 1976

Personal details
- Born: 1912 Charlottesville, Virginia
- Died: July 2, 1983 (aged 70–71) Georgetown University Hospital
- Education: University of Virginia; National War College; Cornell University

Military service
- Branch/service: United States Marine Corps; Office of Naval Intelligence
- Rank: Colonel
- Battles/wars: World War II

John M. "Jack" Maury Jr. was an American intelligence officer and diplomat, notable for his extensive service within the Central Intelligence Agency (CIA) and the State Department.

== Life ==
Maury pursued higher education at the University of Virginia, earning a law degree in 1936. For the next four years, he served as a prosecutor for Albemarle County, Virginia.

From 1940 to 1946, Maury served in the United States Marine Corps. Later in World War II, Maury in Moscow for the Office of Naval Intelligence, and commanded the U.S. military mission in Murmansk. After the war, Maury joined the Central Intelligence Agency (CIA). Around this time, he worked as an aide to Lucius D. Clay, and also worked for Ludwell Lee Montague in National Estimates. In 1952, Maury became Special Assistant to the Director of Central Intelligence for national security council matters.

Maury held the position of Chief of Soviet Operations within the CIA, overseeing intelligence activities related to the Soviet Union.

Maury served as the CIA Station Chief in Athens during the 1967 Greek coup, a period of significant political upheaval. Phillips Talbot, the US ambassador in Athens, disapproved of the military coup which established the "Regime of the Colonels" (1967–1974), complaining that it represented "a rape of democracy"—to which Jack Maury, the CIA chief of station in Athens, answered, "How can you rape a whore?"

From 1968 to 1974, Maury was the CIA's Legislative Counsel, acting as the principal liaison between the agency and the U.S. Congress. Following his tenure at the CIA, Maury was appointed Assistant Secretary of Defense for Legislative Affairs from 1974 to 1976. In this role, he continued to engage with legislative matters, facilitating communication between the Department of Defense and Congress.

== See also ==
- List of CIA station chiefs
- CIA's relationship with the United States Congress
- Doctor Zhivago (novel)
- Doctor Zhivago (film)
- Operation Gladio
