= Carl Channell =

American political fundraiser and lobbyist

Carl Russell Channell
- Born: May 26, 1945; Elkins, West Virginia, U.S.
- Died: May 7, 1990 (aged 44); Washington, D.C., U.S.
- Other name: Spitz Channell
- Education: American University
- Occupation: Fundraiser

Carl Russell Channell (May 25, 1945 - March 15, 1990) was an American political fundraiser and lobbyist.

== Early life ==
Channell was born on May 25, 1945, in Elkins, West Virginia. He served in the United States Army in Germany during the Vietnam War era, and he graduated from American University.

== Career ==
Channell began his career as a motel manager in West Virginia.

In 1979, Channell became a conservative political fundraiser. Via the National Endowment for the Preservation of Liberty, Channell attempted to "stall" the sanctions of the Anti-Apartheid Movement in South Africa. He participated in the fundraising for Contras and was later convicted in the Iran Contra affair.

== Death ==
Channell died on May 7, 1990, in Washington, D.C.
