= Henry M. Jackson High School =

School in Washington, United States

Coordinates: 47°52′24″N 122°12′34″W

Location
- 1508 136th St. SE; Mill Creek, Washington 98012; United States

Information
- Type: Public
- Established: September 7, 1994
- School district: Everett School District
- Principal: Sechin Tower
- Staff: 92.38 (FTE)
- Grades: 9–12
- Enrollment: 2,157 (2023-2024)
- Student to teacher ratio: 23.35
- Colors: Green & Black
- Athletics: Washington Interscholastic Activities Association (WIAA)
- Athletics conference: Wesco 4A
- Mascot: Timberwolves
- Rival: Glacier Peak High School
- Website: jacksonhs.everettsd.org

Henry M. Jackson High School is a public high school in Mill Creek, Washington, United States. Named after politician Henry M. Jackson, the school opened on September 7, 1994, as the third and newest high school constructed in the Everett School District.

Other high schools in the Everett School District are Cascade High School, Everett High School, and Sequoia Alternative School. The school initially served only grades 9–10 so that students at Everett and Cascade could graduate without transferring; it fully opened for grades 9–12 in 1996.

Middle/intermediate schools that feed into Jackson are Heatherwood Middle School, located adjacent to the high school, and Gateway Middle School, located in the Silver Firs area northeast of Mill Creek.

== Academics ==
The school offers an array of academic options including Honors, College, and Advanced Placement classes such as Honors English, University of Washington English, UW Computer-Science, AP English Literature and Composition, AP Language, AP Art, AP Calculus, AP Statistics, AP Psychology, AP Biology, AP Chemistry, AP Physics, AP World History, AP US History, AP Government, AP Capstone, and AP Environmental Science.

== Incidents ==
In 2002, seven students were accused of paddling up to 30 freshmen as part of an apparent initiation rite and were suspended from school. The students targeted freshmen boys to spank with a wooden paddle, police and school officials stated.

In 2009, 14 students were expelled for starting and participating in a food fight. The fight caused senior prom to be temporarily suspended, and a plan of action had to be drawn up so all students knew appropriate behavior.

== Sports ==
Throughout all of its past years, Jackson has been well known for its sports. In 2006, boys' baseball won the 4A State championship. In 2008 and 2014, girls' swimming won first in state. In 2010 girls' volleyball won first in state. Also in 2008, both girls' and boys' basketball made it to state. In 2010 boys' basketball won second in state. In the fall of 2010, football won the WESCO championship for the third straight year. In addition, boys' cross country in the fall of 2009 was ranked first in the nation and was only beat by the second in the nation later on. This was the boys' second consecutive year placing 2nd in the 4A Washington State Cross Country Championships. In the fall of 2008, all of the fall sports except volleyball made it to the playoffs. Other sports like track have also met with success. In the 2009–2010 season for volleyball the girls won state. On March 2, 2013 the Jackson boys' basketball team placed second in state, losing the championship game to Curtis High School and finished the season with a 26–1 record, losing only the championship game. Six of the seven players used were juniors. In the spring 22-23 season of softball, the Timberwolves went 28-1 overall and 8-1 in districts. They finished the last game of the season against Glacier Peak High School 5-1, winning the WIAA. More recently, the 2024 Timberwolves football team made it to the playoffs for the first time since 2012.

== Notable alumni ==
- Daniel Arias — football wide receiver, NFL
- Nijem — wrestler; mixed martial artist for the Ultimate Fighting Championship
- Travis Snider — MLB player, Baltimore Orioles
- Chris Taylor — musician, member of the band Grizzly Bear
- Rheanne Wirkkala — intelligence analyst, American defence-policy advisor
