= Stanford Technology Trading Group International =

Stanford Technology Trading Group International (STTGI) was a shell company founded by USAF Major General Richard V. Secord and Iranian arms dealer Albert Hakim, and a cornerstone of what was informally known as the "Enterprise", a complex web of for-profit business entities and non-profit front organizations created by Secord and Hakim to facilitate sales of arms to Iran, transfers of arms to the Nicaraguan Contras, as well as side dealings that benefited the Enterprise's principals in various ways.

== Anatomy of the Enterprise ==
=== Key people ===
- Thomas G. Clines, aka "C. Tea". Earned $883,000 for his services to the Enterprise.
- Willard I. Zucker, financial manager of the Enterprise's Swiss bank accounts.

=== Business and non-profit entities involved ===
- Compagnie de Service Fiduciaires (CSF)
- National Endowment for the Preservation of Liberty (NEPL)

== See also ==
- The Channel-Miller Operation
