= Daniel Arias =

American football player (born 1998)

Daniel Arias III
Profile
- Position: Wide receiver

Personal information
- Born: September 2, 1998 (age 28); Santo Domingo, Dominican Republic
- Listed height: 6 ft 3 in (1.91 m)
- Listed weight: 216 lb (98 kg)

Career information
- High school: Henry M. Jackson (Mill Creek, Washington, U.S.)
- College: Colorado (2018–2022)
- NFL draft: 2023: undrafted

Career history
- Arizona Cardinals (2023)*; Kansas City Chiefs (2023)*; Arizona Cardinals (2023–2024)*
- * Offseason or practice squad member only
- Stats at Pro Football Reference

Daniel Arias III (born September 2, 1998) is an American football wide receiver who is currently a free agent. He played college football for the Colorado Buffaloes and was signed as an undrafted free agent by the Arizona Cardinals after the 2023 NFL draft.

== Early life ==
Arias was born in Santo Domingo moved to the United States when he was six. His mother was already living and working in Washington State. Arias attended Henry M. Jackson High School in Mill Creek, Washington where played football. He was rated as a three star recruit and was named first-team All-State, first-team All-Area, and first-team All-Wesco as a wide receiver. He was also named first team All-Wesco defensive back. In addition to football, Arias participated in track.

== College career ==
Arias committed to play college football for the Colorado Buffaloes and in his five years there caught 48 passes for 750 yards and four touchdowns.

== Professional career ==
Pre-draft measurables
Height	Weight	Arm length	Hand span	40-yard dash	10-yard split	20-yard split	20-yard shuttle	Three-cone drill	Vertical jump	Broad jump	Bench press
6 ft 3 1/2 in (1.92 m)	208 lb (94 kg)	33 1/4 in (0.84 m)	9 in (0.23 m)	4.52 s	1.58 s	2.70 s	4.27 s	7.09 s	38.0 in (0.97 m)	10 ft 7 in (3.23 m)	9 reps
All values from Pro Day

=== Arizona Cardinals ===
After not being selected in the 2023 NFL draft, Arias was signed by the Arizona Cardinals as an undrafted free agent on May 1, 2023. On August 29, 2023, the Cardinals announced that he had made the initial 53-man roster, but he was waived one day later and re-signed to the practice squad. He was released on September 19.

=== Kansas City Chiefs ===
On September 27, 2023, Arias was signed to the Kansas City Chiefs practice squad. He was released on October 24.

=== Arizona Cardinals (second stint) ===
On November 1, 2023, Arias was signed to the Cardinals practice squad. He was released on November 7. Arias was re-signed on November 21. He was released again on December 19. He signed a reserve/future contract on January 9, 2024. On August 22, 2024, Arias was released.
