= Christopher Sharpley =

American government official (born 1957)

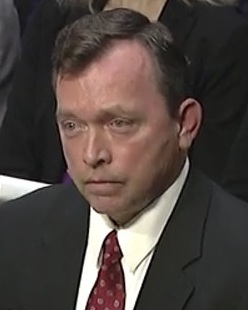

Acting Inspector General of the Central Intelligence Agency
- In office February 1, 2015 – September 9, 2017
- President: Barack Obama; Donald Trump
- Preceded by: David Buckley
- Succeeded by: Christine Ruppert (Acting)

Personal details
- Born: Christopher Robert Sharpley; May 21, 1957 (age 67); Trenton, New Jersey, U.S.
- Education: American University (BA); Naval Postgraduate School (MA)

Christopher Robert Sharpley (born May 21, 1957) was the Acting Inspector General of the Central Intelligence Agency (CIA) from 2015 to 2017. He was nominated by President Donald Trump in September 2017 to become Inspector General of the CIA but failed to receive confirmation in the United States Senate.

== Biography ==
Sharpley received a B.A. from American University in 1981 and was then commissioned as a United States Air Force officer through the ROTC program at Howard University. He later earned an M.A. from the Naval Postgraduate School in 1986. He served on active duty in the Air Force until 1992 and then in the Air Force Reserve until 2002.

In his first leadership function, Sharpley was a Director of Security Operations in the U.S. Air Force. Afterwards, he became the Deputy Inspector General for Investigations and Inspections at the United States Department of Energy.

He then became Deputy Inspector General for Investigations at the Federal Housing Finance Authority and Deputy Special Inspector General for Investigations for the Troubled Asset Relief Program (SIGTARP). In this capacity, he was responsible for the coordination of combined teams of special agents, investigators, analysts, and attorney advisors who as experienced financial and corporate fraud investigators conducted criminal investigations into persons in or out of government who misused or even stole TARP funds. He was part of an investigation into the collapse of a proposed partnership between Colonial BancGroup, Florida's sixth-largest bank, and a mortgage lender, Taylor, Bean & Whitaker, based in Ocala, Florida, that could have brought the entities more than $500 million in federal bailout money.

=== Central Intelligence Agency ===
Since July 2012 he has been Deputy Inspector General at the CIA, becoming for a surprisingly long time the acting successor of Inspector General David Buckley who retired in January 2015, as Shirley Woodward, nominated by President Barack Obama in June 2016, was pending her Senate approval.

In 2016, Sharpley uploaded a report about the CIA's earlier torture practices to the office's internal computer network and then destroyed the hard disk, following standard protocol. Another employee then inadvertently deleted the software copy from the server.

On January 3, 2017, without having held any hearing, the outgoing Senate sent Woodward's nomination back to the President, enabling Sharpley to stay Acting Inspector General. On September 5, 2017, new President Donald Trump nominated him to the post; in October 2017, the Senate Select Committee on Intelligence held a hearing on Sharpley's nomination. After failing to receive further consideration in the Senate, President Trump withdrew the nomination on July 23, 2018.

Sharpley left as acting inspector general of the CIA in August 2018.

=== Private sector ===
In January 2019, he was named managing director of the federal practice at the data management services provider Next Phase Solutions, LLC
