= Assistant Secretary of Defense for Legislative Affairs =

Chief liaison for the DOD to the US Congress

United States Assistant Secretary of Defense for Legislative Affairs
- ASD(LA)
- Seal of the United States Department of Defense

- Flag of an assistant secretary of defense

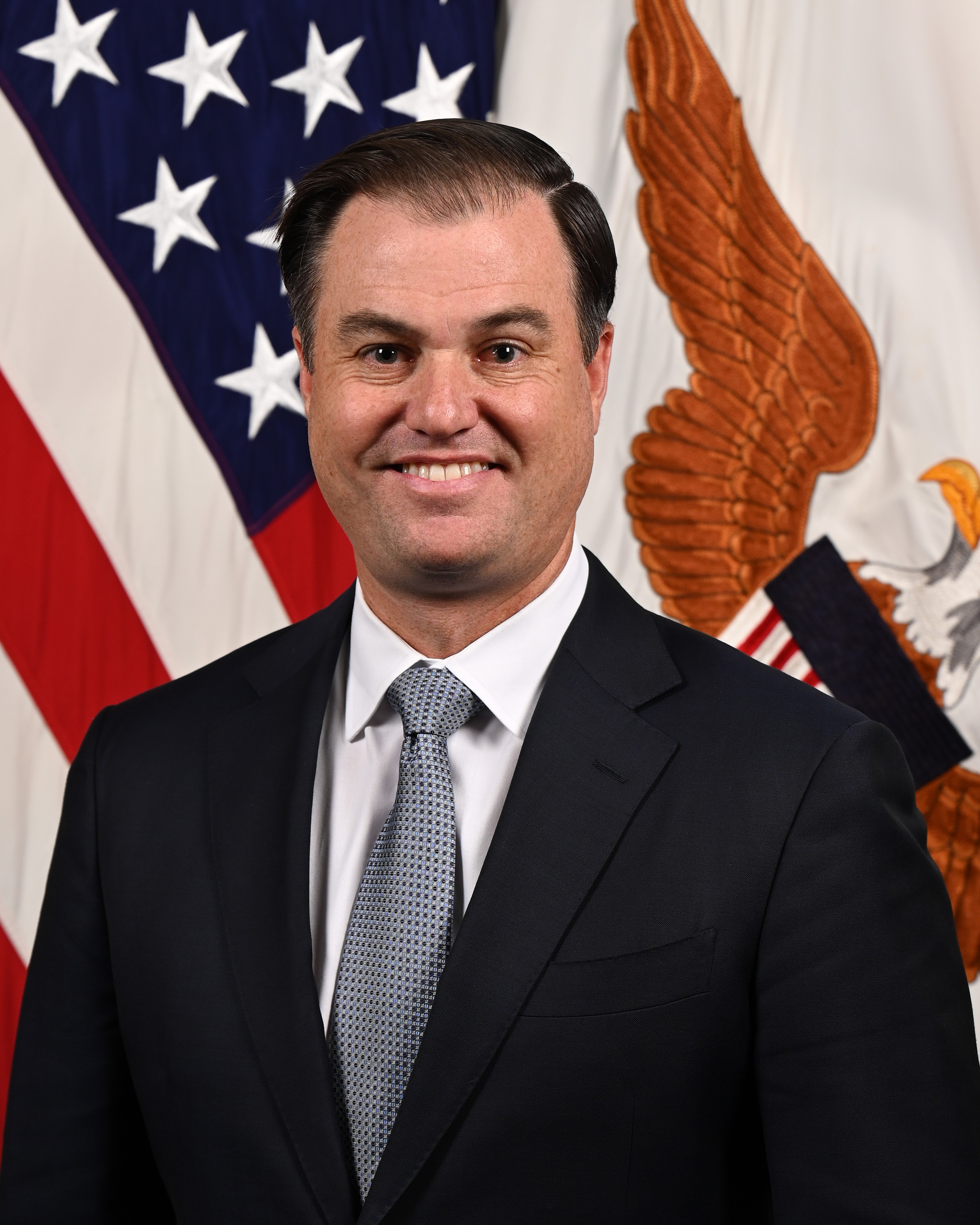
- Incumbent; Dane Hughes since October 14, 2025
- United States Department of Defense; Office of the Secretary of Defense
- Style: Mr Assistant Secretary (informal); The Honorable (formal)
- Reports to: United States Secretary of Defense
- Seat: The Pentagon, Arlington County, Virginia
- Appointer: The president; with Senate advice and consent
- Term length: No fixed term
- Constituting instrument: 10 U.S.C. § 138
- Inaugural holder: Marx Leva
- Formation: 1947
- Salary: Executive Schedule Level IV
- Website: Official website

The assistant secretary of defense for legislative affairs, or ASD(LA), is responsible for providing support to the secretary of defense (SecDef) in his/her dealings with the United States Congress. In addition to serving as SecDef's legislative adviser, the ASD(LA) promotes the Department of Defense's strategy, legislative priorities, policies, and budget before Congress. In carrying out these responsibilities, the ASD(LA) directs a team of managers, action officers, and support personnel who help direct, monitor and manage communications and activities between Congress and elements of the Department of Defense. The ASD(LA) is considered a part of the Office of the Secretary of Defense.

== History ==
This office was established as Special Assistant (Legal, Legislative, and Public Affairs) upon the creation of the National Military Establishment in 1947 (the NME was renamed the Department of Defense in 1949). This was one of three special assistants to the first secretary of defense.

The post was retitled Assistant Secretary of Defense (Legal and Legislative Affairs) in August 1949 based on amendments to the National Security Act (P.L. 81-216) that authorized three assistant secretaries of defense.

The position was abolished in 1953, with its functions divided and transferred to the general counsel and the assistant secretary of defense (legislative and public affairs), new posts established as the result of DoD Reorganization Plan No. 6 (June 1953) and Defense Directive 5122.1 (September 1953).

This position was abolished again in 1957, with its functions divided and transferred to Assistant Secretary of Defense (Public Affairs) and Assistant to the Secretary of Defense (Legislative Affairs), new posts established by Defense Directive 5105.13 (August 1957).

Since 1957, the responsibilities of this position have stayed mostly constant, but the title has changed between Assistant Secretary of Defense and Assistant to the Secretary of Defense five times, largely because the secretary of defense has historically been authorized a limited number of assistant secretaries.

In 1973, the position of Assistant Secretary of Defense for Legislative Affairs was reestablished as a separate assistant secretary billet when the former Assistant Secretary of Defense for Systems Analysis was redesignated as Director of Defense Program Analysis and Evaluation, with the legislative affairs portfolio elevated to an assistant secretary position within the Office of the Secretary of Defense.

The position was given statutory standing as the assistant secretary of defense (legislative affairs) by the National Defense Authorization Act for FY1994 (P.L. 103-160), passed November 30, 1993. Across these changes, the office has continued to serve as the principal staff assistant and adviser to the secretary of defense for congressional relations, coordinating the Department’s contacts with Congress, legislative strategy, and support for hearings and other oversight activities.

== Responsibilities and authority ==
Federal law designates the Assistant Secretary of Defense for Legislative Affairs as one of the Department of Defense's assistant secretaries and provides that the office's principal duty is the overall supervision of the department's legislative affairs. The office develops and oversees the department's legislative strategy and coordinates interactions between the Office of the Secretary of Defense and Congress, including congressional testimony, briefings and visits.

The office also has responsibilities related to congressional hearings and investigations. Department of Defense instructions designate the Assistant Secretary as the central point for receiving authorization-hearing materials and coordinating their transmission to Congress. The office also oversees activities involving legislative investigations of Defense Department activities and coordinates departmental responses to congressional investigations, except for certain matters involving appropriations and financial issues.

In congressional oversight matters, the Assistant Secretary works with the Office of the General Counsel's Legislation, Investigations, and Oversight office. That office coordinates congressional requests for documents and interviews and provides legal advice concerning responses to congressional inquiries, including questions involving privilege and confidentiality.

== Officeholders ==
The table below includes both the various titles of this post over time, as well as all the holders of those offices.

Assistant secretaries of defense (legislative affairs)
Portrait	Name	Tenure	SecDef(s) served under	President(s) served under
	Special Assistant (Legal, Legislative, and Public Affairs)			
	Marx Leva	September 18, 1947 – September 11, 1949	James V. Forrestal	Harry Truman
	Assistant Secretary of Defense (Legal and Legislative Affairs)			
	Marx Leva	September 12, 1949 - May 1, 1951	Louis A. Johnson; George C. Marshall	Harry Truman
	Daniel K. Edwards	May 3, 1951 - November 19, 1951	George C. Marshall; Robert A. Lovett	Harry Truman
	Charles A. Coolidge	November 20, 1951 - December 31, 1952	Robert A. Lovett	Harry Truman
	Assistant Secretary of Defense (Legislative and Public Affairs)			
	Frederick A. Seaton	September 15, 1953 - February 20, 1955	Charles E. Wilson	Dwight Eisenhower
	Robert Tripp Ross	March 15, 1955 - February 20, 1957	Charles E. Wilson	Dwight Eisenhower
	Assistant to the Secretary of Defense (Legislative Affairs)			
	Brig. Gen. Clarence J. Hauck, Jr.	April 1957 - April 1959	Charles E. Wilson; Neil H. McElroy	Dwight Eisenhower
	George W. Vaughan	April 1959 - March 1960	Neil H. McElroy; Thomas S. Gates	Dwight Eisenhower
	Brig. Gen. James D. Hittle	March 1960 - November 1960	Thomas S. Gates	Dwight Eisenhower
	Norman S. Paul	January 25, 1961 - June 30, 1962	Robert S. McNamara	John F. Kennedy
	David E. McGiffert	August 8, 1962 - June 30, 1965	Robert S. McNamara	John F. Kennedy; Lyndon Johnson
	Jack L. Stempler	December 13, 1965 - January 4, 1970	Robert S. McNamara; Clark M. Clifford; Melvin R. Laird	Lyndon Johnson; Richard Nixon
	Richard G. Capen, Jr.	January 5, 1970 - May 1, 1971	Melvin R. Laird	Richard Nixon
	Rady A. Johnson	May 2, 1971 - March 10, 1973	Melvin R. Laird; Elliot L. Richardson	Richard Nixon
	Col. George L.J. Dalferes (Acting)	March 17, 1973 - April 17, 1973	Elliot L. Richardson	Richard Nixon
	Assistant Secretary of Defense (Legislative Affairs)			
	John O. Marsh	April 17, 1973 - February 15, 1974	Elliot L. Richardson; James R. Schlesinger	Richard Nixon
	John M. Maury	April 12, 1974 - February 28, 1976	James R. Schlesinger; Donald Rumsfeld	Richard Nixon; Gerald Ford
	William K. Brehm	March 19, 1976 - January 20, 1977	Donald Rumsfeld	Gerald Ford
	Assistant to the Secretary of Defense (Legislative Affairs)			
	Jack L. Stempler	March 23, 1977 - January 19, 1981	Harold Brown	Jimmy Carter
	Assistant Secretary of Defense (Legislative Affairs)			
	Russell A. Rourke	May 6, 1981 - December 8, 1985	Caspar W. Weinberger	Ronald Reagan
	M. D. B. Carlisle	August 4, 1986 - April 28, 1989	Caspar W. Weinberger; Frank C. Carlucci III; William H. Taft IV (Acting)	Ronald Reagan; George H. W. Bush
	David J. Gribbin III	May 22, 1989 - January 18, 1993	Richard B. Cheney	George H. W. Bush
	Assistant to the Secretary of Defense (Legislative Affairs)			
	Sandra K. Stuart	August 1, 1993 - September 15, 1994	Leslie Aspin, Jr. William J. Perry	Bill Clinton
	Assistant Secretary of Defense (Legislative Affairs)			
	Sandra K. Stuart	September 15, 1994 - February 27, 1999	William J. Perry; William S. Cohen	Bill Clinton
	John K. Veroneau	March 2, 1999 - November 10, 1999 (Acting); November 10, 1999 - February 16, 2001	William S. Cohen	Bill Clinton; George W. Bush
	Powell A. Moore	May 4, 2001 - December 1, 2004	Donald Rumsfeld	George W. Bush
	Daniel R. Stanley	December 1, 2004 - June 30, 2005 (Acting); June 30, 2005 - January 31, 2006	Donald Rumsfeld	George W. Bush
	Robert Wilkie	January 31, 2006 - September 29, 2006 (Acting); September 29, 2006 - January 19, 2009	Donald Rumsfeld; Robert M. Gates	George W. Bush
	Elizabeth L. King	May 7, 2009 - January 1, 2015	Robert M. Gates; Leon Panetta; Chuck Hagel	Barack Obama
	Michael J. Stella (Acting)	January 2, 2015 - April 1, 2015	Chuck Hagel; Ash Carter	Barack Obama
	Stephen C. Hedger	April 1, 2015 - July 5, 2016	Ash Carter	Barack Obama
	Tressa S. Guenov (Acting)	July 5, 2016 - January 20, 2017	Ash Carter	Barack Obama
	Pete Giambastiani (Acting)	January 20, 2017 - August 8, 2017	James Mattis	Donald Trump
	Robert R. Hood	August 8, 2017 - July 24, 2020	James Mattis; Mark Esper	Donald Trump
	Ann Thomas "A.T." Johnston (Acting)	July 27, 2020 - January 20, 2021	Mark Esper; Christopher C. Miller (Acting)	Donald Trump
	Ryan Reilly (Acting)	January 20, 2021 - February 9, 2021	David Norquist (Acting); Lloyd Austin	Joe Biden
	Louis I Lauter (Acting)	February 9, 2021 - April 5, 2022	Lloyd Austin	Joe Biden
	Thomas J. Mancinelli (Acting)	April 5, 2022 - December 2, 2022	Lloyd Austin	Joe Biden
	Rheanne Wirkkala	December 2, 2022 - January 20, 2025	Lloyd Austin	Joe Biden
	Dane Hughes	January 20, 2025 - October 14, 2025 (Acting)	Pete Hegseth	Donald Trump
	Dane Hughes	October 14, 2025 - Present	Pete Hegseth	Donald Trump

== Budget ==
=== Budget totals ===
The annual budget for the ASD(LA) is contained in the OSD's budget, under the Defense-Wide Operation and Maintenance (O&M) account. The Obama administration cut funding for this position by over 37% in FY12.

ASD(LA) Budget, FY 11-12 ($ in thousands)
Line Item	FY11 Estimate	FY12 Request
Assistant Secretary of Defense, Legislative Affairs	789	495
