= Thomas G. Clines =

American intelligence agent (1928–2013)

Thomas Gregory Clines
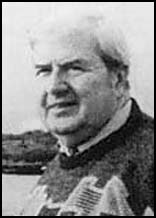
- Clines in December 2005
- Born: August 18, 1928
- Died: July 30, 2013 (aged 84)
- Occupation: Central Intelligence Agency officer
- Known for: Involvement in the Iran-Contra Affair
- Awards: Korea Service Medal with four Bronze Stars; Combat Infantryman Badge

Thomas Gregory Clines (August 18, 1928 – July 30, 2013) was an American covert operations officer for the Central Intelligence Agency, and a prominent figure in the Iran-Contra Affair.

== Background ==
Clines served in the 1950–1953 Korean War, and was awarded the Korea Service Medal with four Bronze Stars, and the Combat Infantryman Badge; his unit also received the Distinguished Unit Citation.

== CIA career ==
In the 1950s, Clines worked at the CIA's Technical Services Division in Frankfurt, Germany.

As a CIA agent, between 1961 and 1962, Clines was involved in covert operations in Cuba. Clines later joined Ted Shackley, David Atlee Phillips and David Sanchez Morales at JMWAVE, the CIA's operational headquarters in Miami, Florida for the Cuban Project also known as Operation Mongoose, a project to overthrow the government of Fidel Castro in Cuba.

During this period, beginning shortly after the 1961 Bay of Pigs Invasion, Clines developed a personal friendship with Nicaraguan President Anastasio Somoza Debayle, after his father, Anastasio Somoza Garcia, allowed the CIA to train anti-Cuban rebels in the country.

Between 1966 and 1970, during the Vietnam War, Clines worked as Ted Shackley's deputy in charge of the CIA's secret war in Laos.

Clines left Laos in 1970 and spent a year at the Naval War College in Newport, Rhode Island.

In 1972, Clines was put in charge of CIA operations in Chile, and in 1973, he helped Augusto Pinochet overthrow Chile's democratically elected president, Salvador Allende.

While working on the attempt to undermine the government of Fidel Castro in Cuba, Clines became friends with Rafael Quintero ("Chi Chi"). When he was given responsibility for Nicaragua in 1978, Thomas Clines recruited Quintero to help the CIA in its efforts against the socialist Sandinista National Liberation Front (FSLN) that governed Nicaragua. This included helping Anastasio Somoza Debayle to develop a counter-subversion program in the country.

== After the CIA ==
In 1978, Clines left the CIA and joined several other ex-CIA officials and contract operatives, including Rafael Quintero, Ted Shackley, and Ricardo Chavez in establishing API Distributors.

In 1979, Clines established International Research and Trade Limited in Bermuda. Later that year, he worked with Hussein Salem to provide Egypt with U.S. military hardware. He made "illicit millions" through EATSCO (the Egyptian American Transport and Services Corporation), but in prosecuting Edwin P. Wilson the U.S. government made a plea bargain that enabled him to escape prosecution, though he had to pay an addition $100,000 to settle civil claims.

== Iran-Contra ==
Clines, as well as Oliver North, Edwin Wilson and Richard Secord, were involved in the conspiracy to provide arms to the Contras, and Clines himself as a key player in the web of business operations founded by Secord and Iranian arms dealer Albert Hakim known as the "Enterprise".

=== Trial ===
On February 22, 1990, Clines was indicted on four felony counts of underreporting to the IRS his earnings from his business enterprises for the 1985 and 1986 tax years by at least $260,000, and failing to disclose on his 1985 and 1986 tax returns that he had foreign overseas bank accounts. The prosecutors were Stuart E. Abrams, Geoffrey S. Berman and William M. Treanor.

On September 18, 1990, Clines was found guilty of all charges. On December 13, 1990, U.S. District Judge Norman P. Ramsey sentenced Clines to 16 months in prison, $40,000 in fines, and Clines was ordered to pay the cost of the prosecution. The Fourth Circuit U.S. Court of Appeals in Richmond, Virginia, on February 27, 1992, upheld his convictions, and Clines served his prison sentence. Clines is the only Iran-Contra defendant to have served a prison sentence.
