= Stanley Moskowitz =

Stanley M. Moskowitz (c. 1937 – June 29, 2006) was a top official of the Central Intelligence Agency.

Moskowitz was born in New York and graduated from Alfred University. While attending graduate school at Duke University, he left to join the CIA in 1962, where he worked for over four decades.

In the 1980s, he was a national intelligence officer for Russia and Eastern Europe and became congressional liaison, serving under two CIA directors.

From 1995-1999, he was the station chief in Israel, where he tried with some success to mediate between the Israelis and Palestinians. His term ended soon after the Benjamin Netanyahu government became dissatisfied with his role and an Israeli paper outed his identity as CIA station chief.

He was briefly the CIA's senior representative to the Council on Foreign Relations in New York. He received two Presidential Distinguished Officer Awards, the Director's Medal, the Distinguished Career Intelligence Medal, the Distinguished Intelligence Medal and the Intelligence Community Medal of Merit.

After retiring in 2005, he continued as a consultant and CIA's representative to the Interagency Working Group on Nazi War Crimes. The team worked to declassify information from the agency's files and as of June 2006 had released 27,000 pages from 174 files, much of it new material.

Former CIA directors Michael V. Hayden and George Tenet issued statements praising him as "truly exceptional" and "indispensable."
