= Richard Secord =

United States Air Force general (1932–2024)

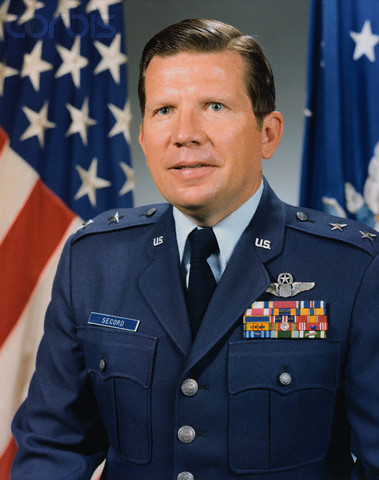
- Born: Richard Vernon Secord; July 6, 1932; LaRue, Ohio, U.S.
- Died: October 15, 2024 (aged 92) Port Orange, Florida, U.S.
- Allegiance: United States
- Branch: United States Air Force
- Service years: 1955–1983
- Rank: Major General
- Commands: 603rd Special Operations Squadron; Military Assistance Advisory Group; United States Air Force Director of International Programs
- Conflicts: Vietnam War; Secret War in Laos; Battle of Lima Site 85
- Awards: Defense Distinguished Service Medal (2); Air Force Distinguished Service Medal; Legion of Merit; Distinguished Flying Cross

Major General Richard Vernon Secord (July 6, 1932 – October 15, 2024) was a United States Air Force officer who worked in covert operations. Early in his military service, he was a member of the first U.S. aviation detachment sent to the Vietnam War in August 1961, Operation Farm Gate. Secord left Vietnam in 1965 to attend Air Command and Staff College. Afterward, he returned to Southeast Asia, being detailed to the Central Intelligence Agency for duty in the Secret War in Laos. While in Laos, he was responsible for several notable military actions. One was the Battle of Lima Site 85. Another was the only successful prisoner of war rescue of the Vietnam War. Both of these came about because of his responsibilities for overseeing the operations of the Royal Lao Air Force, Air America, and Raven FACs.

After his Southeast Asian service, Secord commanded the 603rd Special Operations Squadron and underwent further advanced military education at the Naval War College. He then served on staff duty in the Department of Defense from June 1972 through September 1975. His next posting returned him to Iran, this time managing all U. S. military assistance to the Iranians. He was involved in the Iran–Contra affair, making $2 million on the arms transactions and charged with lying to Congress about it but acquitted. Secord went into business in the private sector after his retirement from the USAF.

== Background and education ==
Richard Vernon Secord was born to Wahnetta and Lowell Secord in LaRue, Ohio, on July 6, 1932. Two younger siblings, Sandra and Jim, were born in the next five years. Laura Secord was one of the ancestors in their family tree. Because they were poor, Lowell Secord taught his eldest son to use firearms for hunting for food from an early age.

Lowell Secord was envious of a childhood friend who had graduated from West Point. To his son, he harped on the benefits of being paid to attend college, and the honor of a military career. Though Lowell moved to Marion, Ohio to become a welder as World War II began, he knew he had not improved his finances enough to afford to send a child to college. Richard adopted the goal of attending the service academy.

Lowell and Wahnetta divorced after the end of World War II. Wahnetta moved the children to Columbus, Ohio in search of better schools. Although her Quaker heritage opposed her to military academies, she also believed Richard should graduate from college. Despite her opposition, Richard gained admission to West Point on his second try, having narrowly failed mathematics on his first academic testing.

As the outbreak of the Korean War had decimated the Class of 1950, Secord's Class of 1955 underwent extraordinarily thorough combat training during his tenure. Secord fought, with limited success, on the academy's varsity boxing team for three years; on his coach's advice, he gave up the sport to evade possible damage to his eyesight.

Secord graduated from West Point in 1955 and was then commissioned in the USAF, completing pilot training in August 1956. Secord later obtained an MSc in international affairs from the George Washington University in 1972, as well as graduating from the Air Command and Staff College in 1966 and the Naval War College in June 1972.

== Military career ==
=== Training and early postings ===
Secord served as a flight instructor from 1956 to 1959 at Laredo Air Force Base, and from 1959 to 1961 as an instructor and operations officer at Tinker Air Force Base. During the latter assignment, he was posted to the University of Oklahoma to study for a master's degree in English Literature. While progressing to the point of needing only his thesis to gain his degree, he met and married his wife, Jo Ann.

In August 1961 he joined covert operations in what would become the 1st Air Commando Wing, remaining there until 1965. As part of Operation Farm Gate, the wing was the first American aviation unit assigned to Vietnam. Secord flew over 200 combat missions between March 1962 to January 1963, flying AT-28s. One of the Vietnamese pilots he met during this assignment was Nguyen Cao Ky, later the president of Vietnam. Another new acquaintance there was Brigadier General Harry "Heinie" Aderholt. Also during this time, Secord was temporarily assigned to the Imperial Iranian Air Force as an adviser (January to July 1963, January to May 1964, January to March 1965).

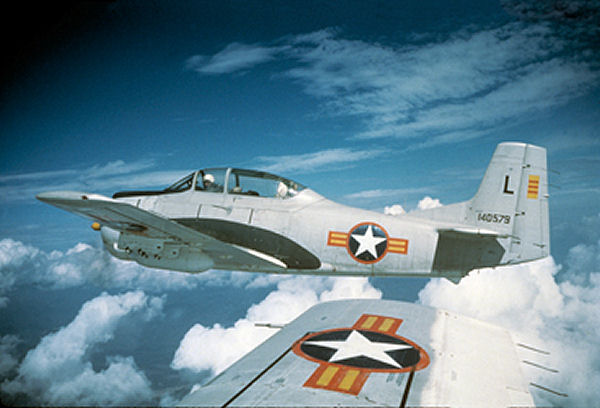
VNAF AT-28s of the Vietnam Air Force. Secord flew 200+ combat missions in these planes while training Vietnamese pilots.

After graduating from the Air Command and Staff College in 1966, Secord returned to Vietnam as an air operations officer, before being transferred to Thailand's Udorn Royal Thai Air Force Base in August 1966. Belatedly promoted to major, he joined Operation Waterpump to train the Royal Lao Air Force. During this time Secord was detailed to the Central Intelligence Agency to serve in the Secret War in Laos. He worked for, and knew, Ted Shackley and Thomas Clines; he worked directly with the CIA officers supplying the Secret War in Laos, James William Lair and Lloyd C. "Pat" Landry.

On January 7, 1967, in what is still a heavily classified operation, Secord directed the only successful prisoner of war rescue of the Vietnam War, the Ban Naden raid. A team of the CIA's hill-tribe mercenaries was inserted out of hearing of the POW prison; their surprise raid quickly wiped out about 40 guards. It was then discovered there were about twice as many prisoners as expected. Nevertheless, a scratch force of nine single-piloted Air America H-34 helicopters dropped into the middle of the Hồ Chí Minh Trail and rescued 53 Asian prisoners. This rescue is still used as a case study in CIA training for covert operations.

Secord's responsibilities as a one-man logistics and operations staff covered a wide range of duties. One of the first duties he assumed was defense of Lima Site 85. In early 1967, General Hunter Harris briefed Secord and Lair on the upgrading of the TACAN installation there with guidance radar. The location, nearly on the Lao border with northern Vietnam, would enable American strike aircraft to follow its radar beam to Hanoi or Vinh and drop their bombs blind, regardless of weather. Lair and Secord were tasked with defense of the site. Despite their best efforts, this site would be overrun in March 1968. Secord requested additional protection for the technicians. Ambassador William H. Sullivan, who supervised the war in Laos by presidential directive, denied the need for stationing Green Berets at the site, or for personal weaponry. However, Secord insubordinately issued small arms to the onsite technicians for self-defense.

Having flown 285 combat missions in Southeast Asia, Secord mulled resigning from the USAF. General Aderholdt convinced him to reconsider. During Secord's next posting, he was promoted to lieutenant colonel ahead of his peers. Secord served at Eglin Air Force Base from September 1968 to November 1969, as assistant deputy chief of staff for operations for the Tactical Air Command, in what would later become the U.S. Air Force Special Operations Force. From there, he transferred to serve as commanding officer of the 603rd Special Operations Squadron. His three years in command of the 603rd was focused on development of the A-37 Dragonfly for counter-insurgency; however, the 603rd was disbanded in June 1971. Secord moved on, to attend the Naval War College in August 1971.

=== Command and staff assignments ===
Secord graduated from the Naval War College in June 1972. He then moved to Washington, D.C., serving in various capacities in the United States Department of Defense. His initial assignment was desk officer for Laos, Thailand and Vietnam under the Assistant Secretary of Defense for International Security Affairs. While serving in this post, Secord claims to have been involved in planning the Christmas bombing of North Vietnam. During this period, on 1 April 1973, he was promoted to colonel far ahead of his contemporaries.

Following that assignment, he assumed the position of Executive Assistant to the Director of the Defense Security Assistance Agency in July 1973.

Secord then was the USAF Chief of the Military Assistance Advisory Group (MAAG) in Iran from September 1975 to July 1978. The new posting mandated a promotion to brigadier general. In his new capacity he managed all USAF military assistance programs in Iran as well as some US Navy and Army programs, and acted as chief adviser to the Commander-in-Chief of the Iranian Air Force. Secord claims that despite endemic corruption in Iran, his MAAG was able to rebate to the Iranian government about $50 million from the Grumman Corporation. During this time he also oversaw Project Dark Gene and Project Ibex. After William H. Sullivan was appointed ambassador, Secord again found himself clashing with the diplomat over the use of U. S. military personnel and civilian technicians.

Returning to Washington, D.C., in July 1978, Secord served at Headquarters U.S. Air Force as director of international programs. Secord's official biography states that he was the ranking US Air Force officer for Operation Eagle Claw, the April 1980 attempt to end the Iran hostage crisis. However, in his autobiography, Secord denies involvement with Eagle Claw. He does give some details of his involvement with Operation Credible Sport, the planned second rescue raid to rescue the American hostages in Iran that was aborted by the hostages' release. In his final military assignment, Secord was Deputy Assistant Secretary of Defense for International Security Affairs with responsibility for Near Eastern, African and South Asian affairs, from April 1981 to May 1983.

While holding these two appointments, Secord continued to be involved in covert operations, though at a high level. He was instrumental in the controversial sale of early warning aircraft to Saudi Arabia.

Secord retired from the Air Force in 1983 after allegations of improper dealings with former CIA agent Edwin P. Wilson. Secord noted that the Reagan administration did not supply him with legal help when he was accused of shady dealings with Wilson. An unindicted Secord went $22,000 in debt for legal representation in conjunction with the Wilson matter, despite serving as a government witness in court against Wilson. The latter never mentioned during trial Secord's participation in any of Wilson's activities. Pentagon service being unhealthy for Secord was another factor in his retirement; he had recently survived three cases of pneumonia in as many years.

== Retirement ==
=== Involvement in Iran–Contra affair ===
Operation Tipped Kettle was a precursor to the Iran-Contra logistics operation. Sources are not explicit about the dates of Secord's involvement, but it seems he may have carried over this project from his military service into his retirement. Operation Tipped Kettle, transferred Palestine Liberation Organization weapons seized by Israel in Lebanon to the Contras.

To stay active during retirement, Secord went into business with Albert Hakim, becoming President of Stanford Technology Trading Group Intl., also known as "The Enterprise", a company involved with arms sales to Iran during the Reagan presidency. The final report of Iran/Contra Independent Counsel Lawrence Walsh concluded that Secord had received at least $2m from his involvement in these activities, and had lied to Congress about it. On November 8, 1989, Secord pleaded guilty to one count of lying to Congress as part of a plea agreement.

He was sentenced to two years probation after pleading guilty to one count in a plea agreement.

In the aftermath, Secord filed a libel case against Leslie Cockburn, Andrew Cockburn, Morgan Entrekin, Atlantic Monthly Press, and Little, Brown and Company, Inc. for publishing a book in 1987 entitled Out of Control: The Story of the Reagan Administration's Secret War in Nicaragua, the Illegal Pipeline, and the Contra Drug Connection. Entrekin, Atlantic Monthly Press, and publishers Little, Brown and Company were dropped from the suit. The court then ordered summary judgment on behalf of the defendants Leslie Cockburn and Andrew Cockburn, indicating that Secord was unable to show the defendants had malicious intent.

=== Later retirement and death ===
In 1989, Secord was charged and convicted of drunk driving in Fairfax County, VA.

In early 1992, Secord and another retired officer Brig. Gen. Harry Aderholt visited the newly independent former Soviet Republic of Azerbaijan on behalf of MEGA Oil, a company established by retired U.S. military officers. Secord reportedly offered to Azerbaijani leaders to train its special operations forces for $10 million.

In 2002, retired General Secord was named CEO and Chairman of the Board at Computerized Thermal Imaging, Inc.

Secord lived in an assisted-living facility in the Daytona Beach area. He died in Port Orange, Florida on October 15, 2024, at the age of 92. He was interred at Arlington National Cemetery.

== Awards and decorations ==
=== National Honours ===
- United States:
  - Defense Distinguished Service Medal
  - Air Force Distinguished Service Medal
  - Legion of Merit
  - Distinguished Flying Cross
  - Meritorious Service Medal
  - Air Medal with two oak leaf clusters
  - Air Force Commendation Medal
  - Air Force Organizational Excellence Award with two oak leaf clusters

=== Foreign honors ===
- Thailand:
  - Commander (Third Class) of the Most Exalted Order of the White Elephant
- South Korea:
  - Cheonsu Medal of the Order of National Security Merit
- South Vietnam:
  - Vietnam Campaign Medal

== See also ==
- Air America (airline)
- Raven Forward Air Controllers
- Stanford Technology Trading Group International
