= Robert R. Hood =

American businessman and government official

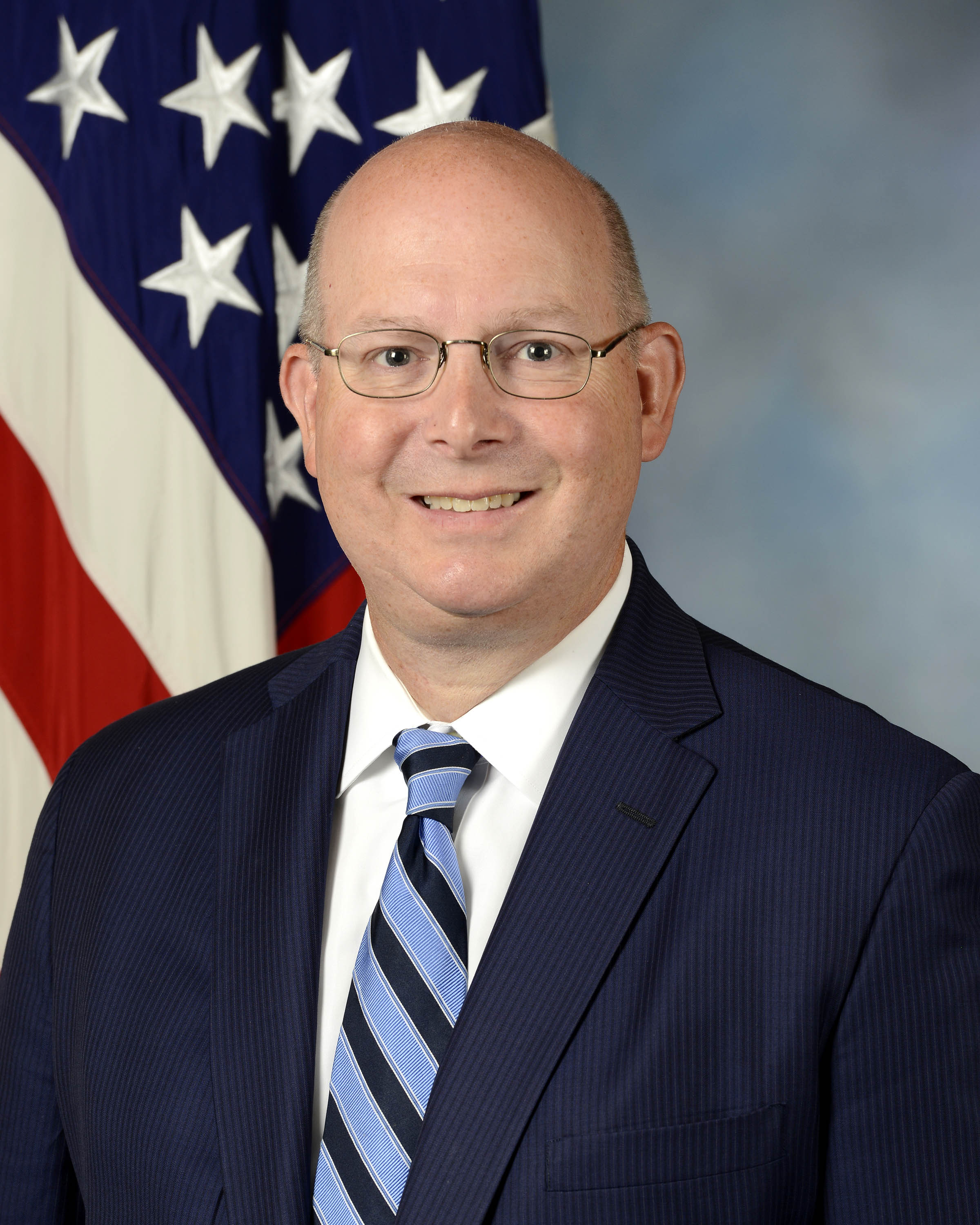

Assistant Secretary of Defense for Legislative Affairs
- In office August 8, 2017 – July 24, 2020
- President: Donald Trump; Joe Biden
- Preceded by: Stephen C. Hedger
- Succeeded by: Ann Thomas "A.T." Johnston (Acting)

Personal details
- Education: University of West Georgia
- Awards: Department of Defense Medal for Distinguished Public Service; National Nuclear Security Administration Gold Medal for Distinguished Service

Robert R. Hood is an American businessman and government official who is the vice president of government affairs and head of the Hyundai Motor Company's Washington, D.C. office. Hood previously served as assistant secretary of defense for legislative affairs (2017–2020).

== Early life and education ==
Hood was born in Kingston, Jamaica and grew up Marietta, Georgia. He is a graduate of the University of West Georgia.

== Career ==
Hood began his congressional career with Congressman Newt Gingrich as his senior legislative assistant and following the 1994 election, became an assistant to the speaker of the House of representatives for policy. In 1999, he joined the House Committee on Science as a professional staff member, where he worked on a number of issues relating to energy and environmental policy. Hood also served as the senior policy advisor to then-Governor Tommy Thompson in the state's DC office.

Hood was previously vice president for government affairs for CH2M. Past roles with the federal government include serving eight years in President George W. Bush's Administration, including at the White House, as a special assistant to the president in the Office of Legislative Affairs and at the United States Department of Defense (2006–2008) as principal deputy assistant secretary for legislative affairs and as deputy under secretary of defense for budget and appropriations affairs. Hood was also the director of congressional affairs of the National Nuclear Security Administration from 2001 to 2006.

== Personal life ==
Hood lives in Alexandria, Virginia with his wife, four children and grandson.

Political offices
Preceded by Stephen C. Hedger	Assistant Secretary of Defense for Legislative Affairs; 2017-present	Incumbent
