= Frederick Hitz =

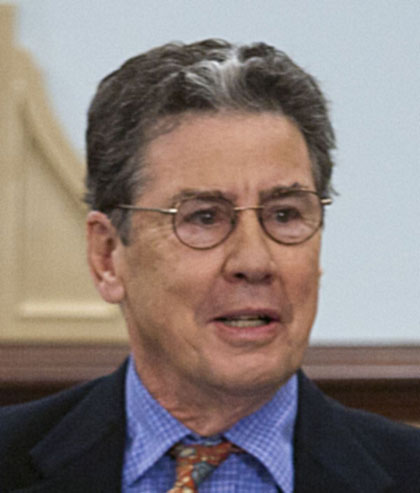

Inspector General of the Central Intelligence Agency
- In office November 13, 1990 – May 1, 1998
- President: George H. W. Bush; Bill Clinton
- Preceded by: William Donnelly
- Succeeded by: Dawn Ellison (Acting)

Legislative Counsel of the Central Intelligence Agency
- In office 1978–1981
- Preceded by: George Lee Cary
- Succeeded by: J William "Billy" Doswell

Personal details
- Born: Frederick Porter Hitz; October 14, 1939 (age 86)
- Education: Princeton University; Harvard University Law School
- Awards: Distinguished Intelligence Medal

Frederick Porter Hitz (born 14 October 1939) is an author and former Inspector General of the Central Intelligence Agency (CIA).

== Life ==
Hitz graduated from Princeton University, where he was a member of the Ivy Club, and Harvard Law School.

Hitz entered the CIA in 1967 as an operations officer. In 1973 Hitz was moved to the State Department, the Department of Defense, and Department of Energy, and then returned to the CIA in 1978. President George H. W. Bush appointed Hitz the first statutory Inspector General of the CIA in 1990.

Hitz played a role in the investigation into CIA involvement in Contra cocaine trafficking during the Reagan administration and the Iran–Contra affair. Hitz was also the lead investigator during the Aldrich Ames affair.

== Controversy ==
In 1992 Hitz, as CIA Inspector General, accused CIA Jamaica station chief Janine Brookner (one of the first female station chiefs), of being a 'boozy provocateur', an accusation that prevented her planned promotion to Prague station chief. His accusations were proven to be false when affidavits in contradiction of all accusations were presented in court filings. Within three hours of the filing of the affidavits, the CIA offered Bookner $480,000 in settlement. Bookner never regained her status within the CIA and resigned; it is not known if Hitz was penalized by the CIA for the false and misleading report, and he has never offered a public statement on his role in sabotaging her career. He was subsequently investigated by the President's Council on Integrity and Efficiency over the affair.

Hitz retired from the CIA in 1998 and took a position as Distinguished Practitioner in Residence in the Woodrow Wilson School of Public and International Affairs at Princeton University. He is also a lecturer at the University of Virginia School of Law, Frank Batten School of Leadership and Public Policy, and Politics Department, specializing in intelligence and anti-terrorism law.

== Publications ==
- 2004: The Great Game: the myth and reality of espionage. New York: Knopf ISBN 0-375-41210-7
- 2008: Why Spy? espionage in an age of uncertainty. New York: Thomas Dunne ISBN 0-312-35604-8
