= Clair George =

American spy for the CIA (1930–2011)

Clair E. George

Deputy Director of CIA for Operations
- In office July 1, 1984 – December 1, 1987
- President: Ronald Reagan
- Preceded by: John H. Stein
- Succeeded by: Richard F. Stoltz

Legislative Liaison of the Central Intelligence Agency
- In office 1982–1984
- Preceded by: J. William Doswell
- Succeeded by: Charles A. Briggs

Personal details
- Born: August 3, 1930 Pittsburgh, Pennsylvania, U.S.
- Died: August 11, 2011 (aged 81) Bethesda, Maryland, U.S.
- Resting place: Arlington National Cemetery
- Spouse: Mary Atkinson George
- Education: Pennsylvania State University
- Profession: Espionage

Military service
- Allegiance: United States
- Branch/service: United States Army
- Battles/wars: Korean War

Clair Elroy George (August 3, 1930 – August 11, 2011) was a veteran of the Central Intelligence Agency's (CIA) clandestine service who oversaw all global espionage activities for the agency in the mid-1980s. According to The New York Times, George was "a consummate spymaster who moved the chess pieces in the CIA's clandestine games of intrigue".

After serving in Korea and Japan as an enlisted man in Army Intelligence, George was one of the CIA's earliest recruits. As such George challenged the traditional image of early CIA recruits. He was not a son of privilege and lacked an Ivy League pedigree. By many accounts, he developed a loyal following for his ebullient manner and courage working in some of the world's most volatile regions.

After a highly decorated career lasting nearly thirty years, including dangerous assignments in Beirut and Athens, George served for three years in the Reagan Administration as Deputy Director for Operations. He was the third-ranking official at the CIA under William Casey.

George made headlines when he became the highest-ranking target of investigation and prosecution in the Iran–Contra affair. After a first mistrial, George was eventually found guilty by a jury on two counts of making false statements to congressional committees investigating the Iran-Contra Affair. He was pardoned by President George H. W. Bush two weeks later along with others involved. The special prosecutor immediately thereafter moved to vacate the indictments against George altogether.

After his retirement from the CIA, George continued to hold legendary hero status in the intelligence community and he was a successful consultant on international matters. He died in Bethesda at age 81 of cardiac arrest. His wife of 45 years, Mary Atkinson George, had died in 2008. She had given up her CIA career when they married.

== Early life ==
Clair Elroy George was born Aug. 3, 1930 in Pittsburgh, Pennsylvania. His family moved several times, ending up in the western Pennsylvania steel-mill town of Beaver Falls, Pennsylvania, when he was 9.

His father was a dairy chemist who worked for the United States Department of Agriculture.

George, nicknamed "Red" because of his hair color, was an academic standout, a musician (drummer) and president of the student council. He worked in a steel mill. He passed on his redheaded genes to his first grandchild who is also named after him “Claire Zoe Davies”.

Later he majored in political science and debated at Pennsylvania State University, graduating in 1952. He was set to enroll in Columbia Law School when he joined the Army instead in the midst of the Korean War. He learned Chinese and worked in counterintelligence. He joined the CIA after being impressed by agency officers he met in the Far East.

In 1960, George married a CIA secretary, Mary Atkinson; she died in 2008. They had two daughters both born in Paris while George was assigned to Bamako, Mali. His legacy is now carried on by his 3 grandchildren Roque Miranda and Luke and Claire Zoe Davies.

== Long CIA service ==
As the CIA's deputy director of operations for three years of the Reagan administration, the third-highest post in the spy agency, George was responsible for cloak-and-dagger activities worldwide. He reached this pinnacle after three decades of working as a spy around the world, specializing in recruiting foreign agents to spy on their own countries for the United States.

After the Korean War, George joined the CIA in 1955. Through cunning and mettle, he advanced through the ranks of the clandestine service, working in Cold War proxy zones in Asia, Africa, the Middle East and Europe. He went from Hong Kong to Paris, from Mali to New Delhi.

The Washington Post Magazine in 1992 quoted a colleague as calling George "a top-notch street man" who operated in what spies call the "night soil circuit"—the less desirable posts of the world.

George served as the CIA's station chief in Beirut when civil war erupted there in 1975. His successor would be kidnapped and assassinated. The following year he volunteered to replace the Athens station chief, who had just been assassinated by the Revolutionary Organization 17 November over the United States' support of the Regime of the Colonels. This gesture, perhaps more than anything, brought him recognition as a dedicated officer willing to make his safety secondary to the needs of the agency.

George returned permanently to Washington in 1979. He placed first out of 100 candidates in a promotions ranking and was put in charge of the agency's African division. William J. Casey, whom Reagan had named director of central intelligence, appointed George to successively higher positions, among them as the CIA's liaison to Congress. He served later as deputy director from 1984 until his retirement in 1987.

== Distinctions and medals ==
George was the recipient of three Distinguished Intelligence Medals from 1983 to 1988 and was awarded the Intelligence Medal of Merit.

== Iran-Contra Affair ==
George was the highest-ranking CIA official to stand trial over the biggest White House scandal since Watergate: a White House-led operation to covertly sell weapons to Iran and divert the profits to right-wing Nicaraguan rebels known as the Contras. The operation had been engineered out of the White House by Marine Lt. Col. Oliver North, who served on the National Security Council staff. North was then aided by CIA Director William Casey.

In September 1991, George was indicted on 9 counts, including making false statements to Congress. After the first court case ended in a mistrial, George was retried in the fall of 1992 on seven counts, resulting in being found guilty on two charges of false statements to Congressional staff. Before George was sentenced, President Bush pardoned him on December 24, 1992. along with several other former administration officials including former defense secretary Caspar W. Weinberger.

== In popular culture ==
In the book and subsequent film adaptation of Charlie Wilson's War, Clair George is referenced in an argument between CIA case officer Gust Avrakotos and Director of European Operations Henry Cravely, portrayed on screen by Philip Seymour Hoffman and John Slattery respectively.

== See also ==
- List of people pardoned or granted clemency by the president of the United States

Government offices
Preceded by John H. Stein	Deputy Director for Operations; July 1, 1984 – December 1, 1987	Succeeded by Richard F. Stoltz
