= Office of Inspector General of the Central Intelligence Agency =

Accountability and audit authority of the CIA

- Seal of the OIG from a declassified report.

Agency overview
- Formed: 1952; 74 years ago
- Jurisdiction: United States
- Headquarters: George Bush Center for Intelligence, Langley, Fairfax County, Virginia
- Agency executive: Peter Thomson, Inspector General of the Central Intelligence Agency
- Parent agency: Central Intelligence Agency
- Website: Official website

The Office of Inspector General of the Central Intelligence Agency (CIA-OIG) is the internal oversight office for the Central Intelligence Agency of the United States. The first inspector general was appointed in 1952.

== The 1970s ==
The Rockefeller Commission, Church Committee, and Pike Committee all recommended strengthening the office of inspector general. Their criticisms included claims that the inspector general had few staff, was ignored, and was denied access to information. Their suggestions were not made into law.

== 1980s ==
The CIA OIG investigation of the Iran–Contra scandal was criticized in the final report of the Congressional investigation of the Iran–Contra affair. Members of the Senate Select Committee on Intelligence (especially Boren, Cohen, Specter, and Glenn) wrestled with how to improve the IG while not interfering with the work of the CIA. They tried to make a bill that would satisfy various members of Congress and also not be vetoed by President George Bush. Senator Boren (chairman of the SSCI) worked with Robert Gates who was deputy to Brent Scowcroft at the time. In 1989, a new IG law was passed, creating a more independent IG. The IG also would no longer be chosen by the Director of Central Intelligence but would instead be appointed by the president with the "advice and consent" of the Senate.

== Global war on terror ==
There were several controversies surrounding the IG during the years of the global war on terror.

The IG released a controversial report on failures of the intelligence community before 9/11.

IG staff Mary O. McCarthy was fired in 2006.

In 2007, General Michael Hayden, head of the CIA, had attorney Robert Deitz review the work of the IG.

=== 2004 Inspector General Report ===
In 2004, the CIA OIG published a report on prisoner treatment in the global war on terror. It was entitled "CIA Inspector General Special Review: Counterterrorism Detention and Interrogation Activities". After a Freedom of Information Act lawsuit by the American Civil Liberties Union, a less redacted version was declassified in 2009 and released to the public.

== List of Inspectors General ==
Name	Term start	Term end	Refs
Donald F. Chamberlain	July 1973	July 1976	
John H. Waller	July 1976	January 1980	
Charles Ackerly Briggs	January 1980	September 1982	
James H. Taylor	September 1982	July 1984	
John H. Stein	July 1984	December 23, 1985	
Carroll L. Hauver	December 23, 1985	January 18, 1988	
William F. Donnelly	January 18, 1988	December 1, 1989	
William F. Donnelly (Acting)	December 1, 1989	November 13, 1990	
Frederick P. Hitz	November 13, 1990	May 1, 1998	
Dawn Ellison (Acting)	May 1, 1998	August 3, 1998	
L. Britt Snider	August 3, 1998	January 20, 2001	
Rebecca Donegan (Acting)	January 21, 2001	November 14, 2001	
Rebecca Donegan (Deputy Inspector General)	November 14, 2001	January 14, 2002	
George Clark (Acting Deputy Inspector General)	January 14, 2002	April 26, 2002	
John L. Helgerson	April 26, 2002	March 21, 2009	
Patricia Lewis (Acting)	March 21, 2009	October 6, 2010	
David Buckley	October 6, 2010	January 31, 2015	
Christopher Sharpley (Acting)	February 1, 2015	September 9, 2017	
Cristine Ruppert (Acting Deputy Inspector General)	September 9, 2017	June 28, 2021	
Robin Ashton	June 28, 2021	December 31, 2024	
Robert Host (Acting)	December 31, 2024	September 19, 2025	
Peter Thomson	September 19, 2025	Present	

== See also ==
- Office of inspector general (United States)
- Inspector General Act of 1978
- CIA's relationship with the United States Congress
