= Albert Hakim =

Iranian businessman

Albert A. Hakim (July 16, 1936 - April 25, 2003) was an Iranian-American businessman and a figure in the Iran-Contra affair.

Born into an Iranian Jewish family, Hakim attended California Polytechnic Institute for three years, beginning in 1955. Back in Iran, he established an export business specializing in advanced technologies, and in avoiding export restrictions related to them. He became persona non grata in Iran after the Islamic Revolution.

Hakim was credited with negotiating a nine-point plan known as the "Hakim Accords", in which he negotiated the release of David P. Jacobsen, an American hostage held by the Islamic Republic of Iran from the Iran Hostage Crisis. Democratic Representative Ed Jenkins called the plan the "Hakim Accords". Later, during Hakim's trial for his role in the Iran-Contra affair, Jacobsen wrote a letter in Hakim's defense in which he stated: "I would be in my fifth year of captivity had it not been for his [Hakim's] extraordinary efforts in negotiating with the Iranian representatives. Other American negotiators had given up, but Mr. Hakim continued."

Hakim moved to California in the early 1980s, and in 1983 established Stanford Technology Trading Group International (STTGI) with retired Air Force Major General Richard Secord. STTGI subsequently became involved in illegal covert operations to supply the Nicaraguan contras, as part of the Iran-Contra affair. For his part in the matter, Hakim was charged with five felonies, which were dismissed, and subsequently pleaded guilty in a plea bargain to a misdemeanor, and was sentenced to probation and a fine of $5000.

Hakim died of a brain aneurysm in 2003, aged 66, Inchon, South Korea, where he had moved to be near his wife's family.
