= Wesley Wark =

Wesley K. Wark (born 1952) is a Canadian historian, an associate professor emeritus of history at the University of Toronto, and an invited professor at the University of Ottawa.

== Education ==
Wark earned a B.A. from Carleton University in 1975, an M.A. from Cambridge University in 1977 and a Ph.D. from the London School of Economics and Political Science (LSE) in 1984. He was a faculty member at McGill University from 1982 to 1983, at the University of Calgary from 1983 to 1988, and at the University of Toronto from 1988 until his retirement in 2013.

== Career ==
Wark was President of the Canadian Association for Security and Intelligence Studies (CASIS) in 1998-2000 and 2004–2006. He served on the Prime Minister's Advisory Council on National Security (2005–2009).

Wark is a frequent media commentator on national security and intelligence and contemporary security issues. His scholarly interests include the popular culture of espionage in the contemporary history, the study of terrorism and counter-terrorism and modern and contemporary international relations. He was also a member of the Committee on the Civil Dimension of Security of the NATO Parliamentary Assembly.

== Books ==
- The Ultimate Enemy: British Intelligence and Nazi Germany, 1985
- Security and Intelligence in a Changing World: New Perspectives for the 1990s (co-editor with Anthony Stuart Farson and David Stafford), Psychology Press, 1991
- Spy Fiction, Spy Films, and Real Intelligence, 1991 (editor)
- Espionage: Past, Present, Future? Elsevier, 1994 (editor)
- Twenty-First Century Intelligence, Routledge, 2013 (editor)
