= CIA Library =

Library of the US Central Intelligence Agency

Coordinates: 37°57′7.5″N 77°8′42.6″W

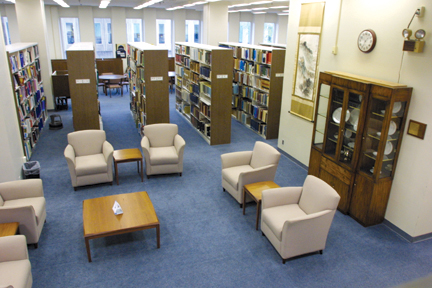
The CIA Library

The CIA Library is a library available only to Central Intelligence Agency personnel, contains approximately 125,000 books and archives of about 1,700 periodicals. Many of its information resources are available via its Digital Library, which include CD-ROMs and web-based resources.

== History ==
The library was created in 1947. During the Hungarian Revolution, the CIA librarian reviewed tapes of broadcasts by Radio Free Europe two other Hungarian speakers who worked for the agency, and provided answers to questions posed by the Agency's International Organization Division. In later years, names of two librarians would be revealed: Alexander Toth who worked as a librarian in the 1950s, and Evelyn C. Chen, who received a masters degree in library science from Columbia University, working as a librarian from 1961 to 1972.

In 1994, Harold Weisberg told CIA Director R. James Woolsey that a librarian that used to work at Hood College had once worked for the Agency as a librarian.

In February 1997, three librarians working at the institution spoke to Information Outlook, a publication of the Special Libraries Association (SLA), noted the importance of the library in disseminating information to employees, even with a small staff, and how the library organizes its materials.

Peggy Tuten, chief of the CIA library from 1999 to 2006, revealed in 2020 that staff at the library were some of the first users of the internet, in 1999, at the Agency. She also noted that in 2001 the library moved from being part of the Directorate of Intelligence to under the Foreign Broadcast Information Service, a subdivision of the Agency's Directorate of Science and Technology, annoying staff. Tuten also noted that following 9/11, the library was renovated as the Agency began to hire new staff, and that she left the library in 2006 to join the Open Source Center of the Director of National Intelligence. In later years she recruited students in library schools to join the Agency for their careers.

In August 2000, Kimberley W. Condas of library was awarded the 2000 International Special Librarians Day (ISLD) Award, which is given to a member, or members, of the SLA who use the International Special Librarians Day to "promote their own libraries and the profession." Condas chaired a committee which promoted ISLD to Agency employees, with more than 500 attending the event.

In May 2007, it was reported that the Agency was looking for "trained, innovative, customer-service oriented librarians" who had East Asian, Chinese, and Arabic language skills, and had various library skills.

In March 2016 it was reported that the Agency was hiring a librarian, with a salary of "$50,864 to $118,069 a year". The job notice also stated that librarians have opportunities to serve as embedded "information experts" within the Agency and play an important part in "intelligence gathering and managing CIA materials."

In an April 2019 Twitter thread, the Agency said they had full-time librarians, with library cards only available to those with security clearances. An accompanying blog post said that the library might appear like modern public libraries, but has a mostly declassified collection, even with DVDs of "spy movies and documentaries," and noted that some librarians are even recruited by other parts of the Agency due to their research and information science skills.

In April 2020, the Agency promoted the library's resources during National Library Week, noting the roles of libraries at the CIA, sharing declassified and unclassified resources about the Agency. American Libraries, the flagship magazine of the American Library Association, entitled a post "Find the CIA Library at your place," quoting and linking to the Agency's post.

In May 2021, an unnamed gay librarian, who worked for the library, was shown in a recruitment video for the Agency.

== Collections ==
The Library maintains three collections: Reference, Circulating, and Historical Intelligence. New material for these collections is selected around current intelligence objectives and priorities.

The reference collection includes core research tools such as encyclopedias, dictionaries, commercial directories, atlases, diplomatic lists, and foreign and domestic phone books. CD-ROMs and extensive commercial database services round out the collection. At one time, the CREST, otherwise known as the Central Intelligence Agency's Freedom of Information Act Electronic Reading Room, was under the library, along with other historical publications, and current ones like The World Factbook. In 1994, the collection was described as a "centralized library reference file," with documents retained in paper and microform.

The circulating collection consists of monographs, newspapers, and journals. Many information resources, such as CD-ROMs and web-based resources, are available to customers via the Digital Library. The library also participates in inter-library loans of circulating items with other domestic libraries.

The Historical Intelligence Collection is primarily an open-source library dedicated to the collection, retention, and exploitation of material dealing with the intelligence profession. Currently there are over 25,000 books and an extensive collection of press clippings on that subject. This likely includes documents which detail the "CIA's role in Indochina during the Vietnam War," and about the launching of Sputnik.

== See also ==
- The Library of National Intelligence, part of the CIA's A-Space project
