= Edwin P. Wilson =

American intelligence officer and businessman (1928–2012)

- Born: Edwin Paul Wilson; May 3, 1928; Nampa, Idaho, U.S.
- Died: September 10, 2012 (aged 84); Seattle, Washington, U.S.
- Military career
- Allegiance: United States
- Branch: United States Marine Corps
- Service years: 1953–1956
- Conflicts: Korean War
- Other work: Central Intelligence Agency (1956–1971); Office of Naval Intelligence (1971–1976)

Edwin Paul Wilson (May 3, 1928 – September 10, 2012) was a former CIA and Office of Naval Intelligence officer who was convicted in 1983 of illegally selling weapons to Libya. It was later found that the United States Department of Justice had relied on a false affidavit when prosecuting Wilson; as a result, Wilson's convictions were overturned in 2003 and he was freed the following year.

== Early life ==
Edwin P. Wilson was born to a poor farming family in Nampa, Idaho, in 1928. He first worked as a merchant seaman. In 1953, Wilson earned a psychology degree from the University of Portland. That same year, Wilson joined the Marines and fought in the last days of the Korean War. He was said to have been impressive during his military service and, when he was discharged in 1956 for a knee injury, went to work for the Central Intelligence Agency.

== CIA career ==
Wilson's first assignments were for the Office of Security; this included a stint in 1956 guarding U-2 spy planes in Turkey. In 1960, the Agency sent him to Cornell University for graduate studies in labor relations. He put this and his knowledge of psychology to use in the Agency's International Organizations Division (IOD) tackling communism in trade unions around the world. Wilson was involved in attempts to destabilize European labor unions, for example, by using methods as diverse as involving Corsican mobsters and using plagues of cockroaches.

"Wilson was on the CIA's payroll, and doing the agency's bidding, all the time he was employed by one of the largest labor unions in the United States as its international representative in Europe. He served as an advance man for Hubert H. Humphrey in the 1964 campaign, thus playing an active role in partisan politics, while still working for the CIA."

However, Wilson's most valuable time for the CIA was in Special Operations Division (SOD) setting up front companies like Maritime Consulting Associates (1964) and Consultants International (1965), which were used to covertly ship supplies around the world. For example, cargoes included disassembled boats sent to central Africa where they were welded together on the shores of Lake Tanganyika and used to intercept Soviet arms being ferried across the lake to rebels in the Congo; arms to Angola; crowd-control gear to Chile, Brazil and Venezuela; all kinds of equipment for intelligence-gathering facilities in Iran; supplies for a group of dissident army officers planning a coup in Indonesia; and barges sent to Vietnam. As director of these firms, which were conducted as legitimate businesses, Wilson began to amass a lot of money, but as a contractor, not an employee. He invested in property around the world. In 1971, after 15 years with the CIA, events that have been disputed ended Wilson's official career there. He nevertheless received a year's pay and acquired ownership of some of his front companies.

== ONI career ==
In 1971, with the CIA's knowledge and approval, Wilson moved to the Office of Naval Intelligence, where he worked full-time for a secret intelligence unit called the Naval Field Operations Support Group (NFOSG) or Task Force 157. Between its inception in 1966 and its termination in 1977, the focus was on acquiring intelligence on Soviet naval activity. However, the unit's remit was wider and later described as "the U.S. military's only network of undercover agents and spies operating abroad using commercial and business 'cover' for their espionage." At this time, Wilson set up another front company—World Marine, Inc.—to assist with his logistics work. Wilson then retired from the ONI in 1976 after events that have been disputed. After a change in commanders, Wilson reportedly appealed to Admiral Bobby Inman, the Director of Naval Intelligence, offering his influence in Congress to the ONI's budget troubles if he, Wilson, could be made chief of Task Force 157. Allegedly outraged, Inman shut down Task Force 157 altogether and reported Wilson to the FBI. However, other calculations may have been in play.

Wilson continued to run the businesses he had built under the guidance of the CIA, the largest of which was Consultants International. He reportedly amassed a fortune of over $20 million through these businesses, and continued to offer covert shipping services at the request of the CIA after his official retirement.

== Arms for Libya controversy ==
In the 1970s, he became involved in dealings with Libya. Wilson claimed that a high-ranking CIA official Theodore "Blond Ghost" Shackley asked him to go to Libya to keep an eye on Carlos the Jackal, the infamous terrorist, who was living there. At the time, a strict sanctions regime was in place against Libya and the country was willing to pay a great deal for weapons and material. Wilson stated he began conducting elaborate dealings, and guns and military uniforms were smuggled into the country. Wilson also recruited a group of retired Green Berets—decorated Vietnam veteran Billy Waugh among them—to go to Libya and train its military and intelligence officers. Wilson states that he regrets these incidents and had no prior knowledge of them. He claimed that he was still working for the CIA despite the government's continued denials, and that his supplying of weapon to the Libyans was an attempt to get close to them and gain valuable intelligence. This included attempts at gathering information on the Libyan nuclear program.

The most dramatic deal, and the one that brought Wilson to the attention of the U.S. government, was for some twenty tons of military-grade C-4 plastic explosives.

Another scandal broke out around Wilson when a company he had formed to ship United States military aid to Egypt was convicted of overcharging the United States Department of Defense by $8 million. A partner with Edwin P. Wilson in this company was another former CIA officer, Thomas G. Clines. Wilson also maintained that Major General Richard V. Secord was also a "silent partner" in this company, though Secord denied this allegation. Nonetheless, Wilson, Clines and Theodore Shackley (another former CIA officer) were all working together with Secord in the summer of 1984 when Oliver North approached Secord to ask for help in buying arms for the Contras, a group of armed rebels then trying to overturn the leftist Sandinista government of Nicaragua.

=== Investigation and conviction ===
After a lengthy investigation by the Bureau of Alcohol, Tobacco and Firearms (then part of the U.S. Department of the Treasury), Wilson was indicted by the U.S. Justice Department for firearms and explosives violations. However, he was in Libya, which would not extradite him. Wilson was very unhappy in Libya, the Libyans were suspicious of him, and he feared for his safety. The prosecutors, led by Lawrence Barcella, knew this and they sent an operative with links to the CIA to convince Wilson that he would be safe in the Dominican Republic. Wilson flew to the Caribbean, but upon arrival was arrested and flown to New York.

He was put on trial four separate times. Before he stood trial, several prosecution witnesses died under suspicious circumstances, including Cuban exile Rafael Villaverde, who disappeared in a boating accident near the Bahamas after an explosion on his boat, and former CIA agent Kevin P. Mulcahy, who had worked for Wilson and blown the whistle to the government. Wilson's friend Ricardo Morales, a longtime nemesis of Villaverde in the Cuban exile community, would die in a bar fight in December 1983.

Wilson was found not guilty of trying to hire a group of Cuban exiles to kill Libyan dissident Umar Muhayshi (his co-defendant Frank Terpil never stood trial as he was a fugitive the rest of his life and died in Cuba in 2016). He was found guilty of exporting guns, including the one used in the Bonn assassination and of shipping the explosives and sentenced to 15 years in prison for the former and 17 years for the latter. While awaiting trial, he allegedly approached a fellow prisoner and attempted to hire him to kill the federal prosecutors. The prisoner instead went to the authorities and they set Wilson up with an undercover agent. The agent taped Wilson hiring him to kill the prosecutors, six witnesses and his ex-wife. In a subsequent trial, he was sentenced to an added 24 years in jail for conspiracy to murder.

=== Legal defense ===
Wilson's defense to the Libyan charges was that he was working at the behest of the CIA. The CIA gave the DOJ an affidavit stating that, after his retirement, he had not been employed directly or indirectly by the agency. The CIA later informed the DOJ that it should not use the affidavit at trial, but the prosecutor Ted Greenberg decided to use it anyway.

While in prison, Wilson campaigned vigorously for his innocence and repeatedly filed Freedom of Information Act requests with the government. Eventually, he found information linked to the memo and hired a new lawyer, David Adler, a former CIA officer who had clearance to view classified documents. Adler spent long hours poring through thousands of files and eventually found 80 incidents where Wilson met on a professional basis with the CIA and proof that the CIA had indirectly used Wilson after his retirement. The CIA had lied before the court.

In October 2003 U.S. District Judge Lynn Hughes, overturned his conviction on the explosives charge, finding that U.S. Justice Department prosecutors knew Wilson had worked for the CIA. Wilson was released from prison on September 14, 2004, after being incarcerated for 22 years. Over 12 of those years were in solitary confinement.

=== Civil action ===
Wilson filed a civil suit against seven former federal prosecutors, two of whom are now federal judges, and a past executive director of the CIA. On March 29, 2007, U.S. District Judge Lee Rosenthal dismissed his case on the ground that all eight had immunity covering their actions.

== Later life ==
After his 2004 release from prison, Wilson moved north of Seattle to live with his brother.

On 10 September 2012, Wilson died of complications from heart valve replacement surgery, survived by his sons Karl and Erik, sister Leora Pinkston and girlfriend Cate Callahan.
