= Israeli support for Iran during the Iran–Iraq War =

Overview of Israel's role in the Iran–Iraq War

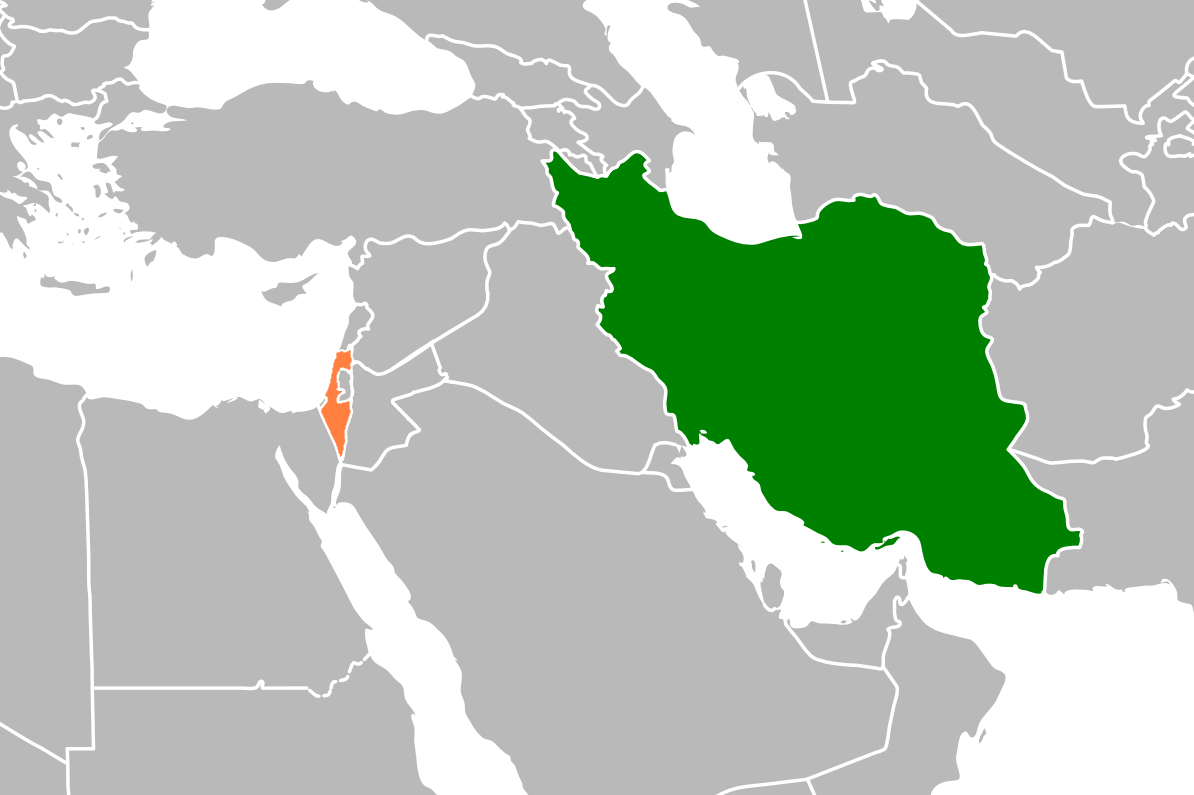
Israel (orange) was an important clandestine weapons supplier to Iran (green) during the Iran–Iraq War.

Israel supported Iran during the Iran–Iraq War. Israel was one of the main suppliers of military equipment to Iran during the war. Israel also provided military instructors during the war, and in turn received Iranian intelligence that helped it carry out Operation Opera against Iraq's Osirak nuclear reactor. The nuclear reactor was a central component of Iraq's nuclear weapons program.

Israel supported Iran during the war so that Iran could provide a counterweight to Iraq; to re-establish influence in Iran which Israel lost with the overthrow of the shah in 1979, and to create business for the Israeli weapons industry. The Israeli arms sales to Iran also facilitated the unhindered emigration of the Persian Jewish community from Iran to Israel and the United States. Israel's support for Iran during the war was done clandestinely, and Iran publicly denied any cooperation between the two countries.

== Background ==
=== Iranian Revolution ===
Before Iranian Revolution in 1979, Iran under the Shah Mohammad Reza Pahlavi was an ally and major buyer of Israeli weapons. However, after the revolution, the new government of Ayatollah Khomeini froze relations with Israel and was openly hostile towards it. Relations between Iran and Iraq also deteriorated after the revolution. Khomeini preached to Iran's bordering Shiite populations to continue the Islamic revolution. Iran actively sought to destabilize its neighboring countries seeking regional hegemony, even though neighboring countries like Iraq sought a conciliatory position. Iran's hostility led to an escalation of rhetoric between Ayatollah Khomeini and Iraqi President Saddam Hussein, a Sunni who advocated for secular pan-Arab nationalism. With the turmoil in Iran, because of the revolution, Saddam Hussein saw an opening to take Iran's Khuzestan province which had Iran's southern oilfields and an Arab majority. By early 1980, it became evident to both countries that preparation for possible war would be a necessary measure.

The first prime minister appointed by the revolutionary government was Mehdi Bazargan. He reached out to the U.S. government for military arms to help consolidate his position; however, the Carter administration chose not to become involved in Iran's internal affairs. By the fall of 1979, Prime Minister Bazargan's moderate faction began to lose the internal struggle to the rising hard liner faction in the revolutionary government. On 4 November 1979, elements of the extremist faction seized the United States embassy and held the American embassy employees hostage. As a result of the hostage taking, the US government placed an embargo on Iran.

=== Covert arms deal ===
Unable to get military equipment from the Carter administration, the Iranians reached out through back channels to the Israeli government and negotiated a preliminary covert arms deal between the two countries. In early 1980, the first military equipment sale by Israel to the Iranian government of Ayatollah Khomeini occurred, when Israel sold to Iran a large number of tires for the F-4 Phantom fighter jet. The net profit from the sale gave rise to an extra-budgetary Likud party/intelligence community slush fund, which grew substantial over the next years.

Iranian officer, Mohammad-Reza Aminizadeh, chief of the first battalion of air ground forces who sought political asylum in England in 1985, described in an interview with London-based magazine Al-Dastur his observation of the first contacts between Israel and Khomeini's government. The head of the Israeli mission to Iran at the time was Colonel Uri, a high-ranking army officer. Aminizadeh described how:

"When [Colonel Uri] reached Tehran I guided him with a helicopter to Lavisan garrison. After five days in Tehran he met most of the high ranking officials of the Islamic Republic even while the American diplomats were still hostage in Tehran. Three days after mission returned to Tel Aviv one airline cargo flew to Larnaca and brought Phantom or F-14 parts, 'Tom Cat', and since then the relations developed so that besides arms, medicine, chicken, eggs, and foodstuffs were also exported to Iran."

=== Start of war ===
On 22 September 1980 Iraq attacked Iran. With the start of the war, Iran was under substantial pressure to gain access to military equipment to defend itself. Iran needed American-made and British-made military equipment, since its arsenal was based on American armaments and British armaments acquired during the Shah's rule. Iran continued with its outreach to Israel. The first mission from Israel in early 1980 was later followed by a second mission in October 1980. The second mission resulted in a new set of arms deals. On 24 October 1980, Scorpion tank parts and 250 tires for F-4 jets were flown to Iran. Around the same time, other Israeli-owned military supplies were being clandestinely shipped from European storage locations to the Iranian ports of Chabahar, Bandar Abbas, and Bushehr. The military supplies included spare parts for American built F-4 jets, helicopters, and missile systems. The Carter administration found out about the military equipment sales and, subsequently, pressured the Israeli government to halt future sales, while the United States negotiated with Iran for the release of the American embassy employees held hostage.

=== Israeli–U.S. agreement ===
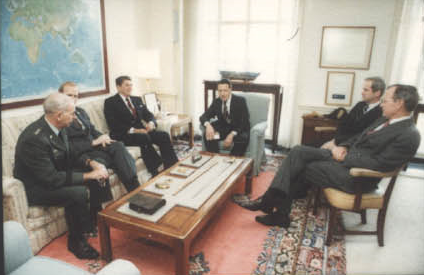
President Ronald Reagan (left, back) in a meeting with national security adviser Robert McFarlane (right, back)

Following the start of the war, Israel sought permission from the United States to sell to Iran necessary American-made military equipment. The newly elected Ronald Reagan administration in early 1981 at the time of the release of the American embassy hostages gave covert consent to Israel to sell unsophisticated American-made military equipment to Iran; even though officially, the Reagan administration staunchly opposed any weapon sales to Iran. Robert McFarlane, who was Counselor of the State Department, coordinated the Israeli–U.S. agreement between Israeli Prime Minister Menachem Begin and U.S. Secretary of State Alexander Haig.

Israel started selling unsophisticated American military equipment to Iran at this time; at the same time Israel breached the agreement and also sold sophisticated American military equipment to Iran. In order to implement these illicit sales, Israeli intelligence set up a covert operation in New York City. Israeli intelligence ran a front company of 50 employees on John Street in the Wall Street area. The office was used to direct the covert purchases of American military equipment to resell to Iran. In March 1982, there was a leak to The New York Times about Israel's covert weapon sales to Iran. Fearing the company's operations might have been compromised, the covert Israeli weapons purchasing operation was moved to London in 1983. The London operation managed a worldwide network of private arm dealers, shell companies, and shippers who over the course of the war sold covertly for Israel several billion dollars' worth of American-made arms to Iran.

By 1982 it became evident to the U.S. State Department that the Israeli government was routinely selling American-made military material without Washington's case-by-case consent, which was part of the original agreement between Prime Minister Menachem Begin and Secretary of State Alexander Haig. In early 1982, after it was determined that Israeli Defense Minister Ariel Sharon was violating the agreement, the Reagan administration rescinded its consent for the sale of any American related military equipment by Israel to Iran. The U.S. government continued to watch after this time Israel make military equipment sales to Iran. The Reagan administration, despite Israel's sales to Iran, continued to replenish Israel's weapons stockpile of American-made weapons, although it was evident that the weapons were ending up in Iran. The willful ignoring of Israel's arms sales to Iran occurred despite the fact that the Reagan administration began in 1983 an aggressive public campaign, known as Operation Staunch, to stop worldwide weapons related sales to Iran.

== Weapon sales ==
=== Iraqi invasion to reversal (1980–1982) ===
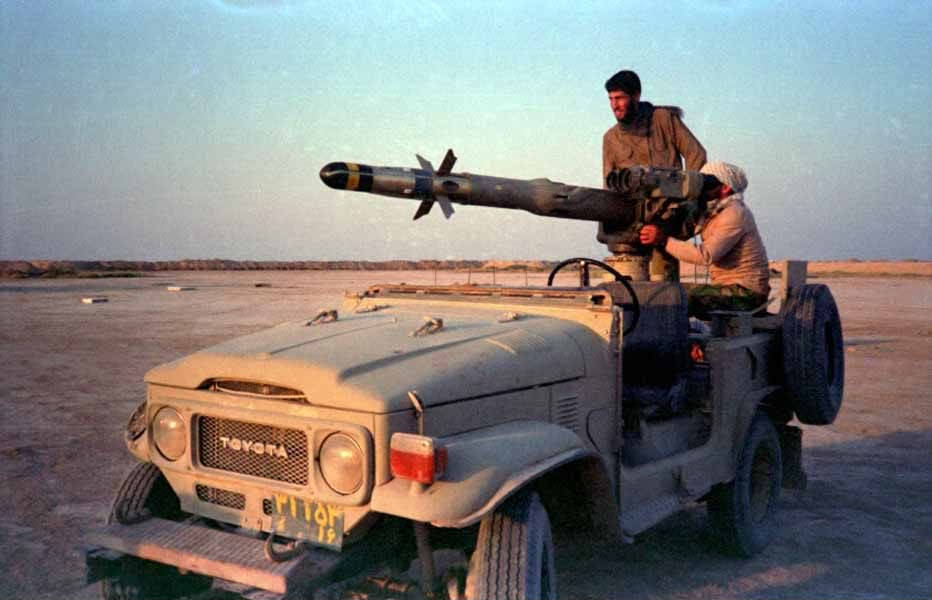
Two Iranian soldiers with a BGM-71 TOW (a weapon type sold by Israel to Iran) mounted on a Toyota Landcruiser during the Iran–Iraq War

Israeli arms sales to Iran totaled an estimated $500 million from 1981 to 1983 according to the Jaffe Institute for Strategic Studies at Tel Aviv University. Other arms experts estimated the total sales at more than $500 million per year including aircraft spare parts, artillery, and ammunition. Internal U.S. government reports indicated that in the early 1980s total Israeli arms sale to Iran approached $2 billion each year. Most of it was paid for by Iranian oil delivered to Israel. According to Ahmad Haidari, an arms dealer who worked for the Iranian government, "roughly 80 percent of the weaponry bought by Tehran immediately after the onset of the war originated in Israel." The fact "that the Iranian air force could function at all", according to Mark Phythian, after Iraq's initial attack and "was able to undertake a number of sorties over Baghdad and strike at strategic installations" was "at least partly due to the decision of the Reagan administration to allow Israel to channel arms of US origin to Iran to prevent an easy and early Iraqi victory."

In the first year of large scale arms sales in 1981, Israel sold Iran $75 million worth of arms from stocks of Israel Military Industries, Israel Aircraft Industries and Israel Defense Forces stockpiles, in their Operation Seashell. Materiel included 150 M-40 antitank guns and 24,000 shells, spare parts for tank and aircraft engines, 106 mm, 130 mm, 203 mm and 175 mm shells and TOW missiles. The Cyprus Weekly reported that Larnaca airport was used to transfer the arms from Israel to Tehran. The material was transported originally by air using chartered planes from Argentine airline Transporte Aéreo Rioplatense and then, after the 1981 Armenia mid-air collision, by ship.

Yaakov Nimrodi, who was Israel's military attaché in Tehran from 1955 to 1979, in July 1981 signed an arms deal with Iran's Ministry of National Defense. Nimrodi agreed to sell to Iran $136 million worth of arms, including Lance missiles, Copperhead shells and Hawk missiles. A French newspaper confirmed the sale with photocopies of the contract for the $136 million arms deal. In March 1982, The New York Times cited documents indicating that Israel had supplied half or more of all arms reaching Tehran in the previous 18 months, amounting to at least $100 million in sales. The Milan weekly Panorama reported that Israel had sold Iran 45,000 Uzi submachine guns, anti-tank missile launchers, missiles, howitzers and aircraft replacement parts. "A large part of the booty from the PLO during the 1982 Lebanon campaign wound up in Tehran".

=== Iranian offensive to stalemate (1982–1984) ===
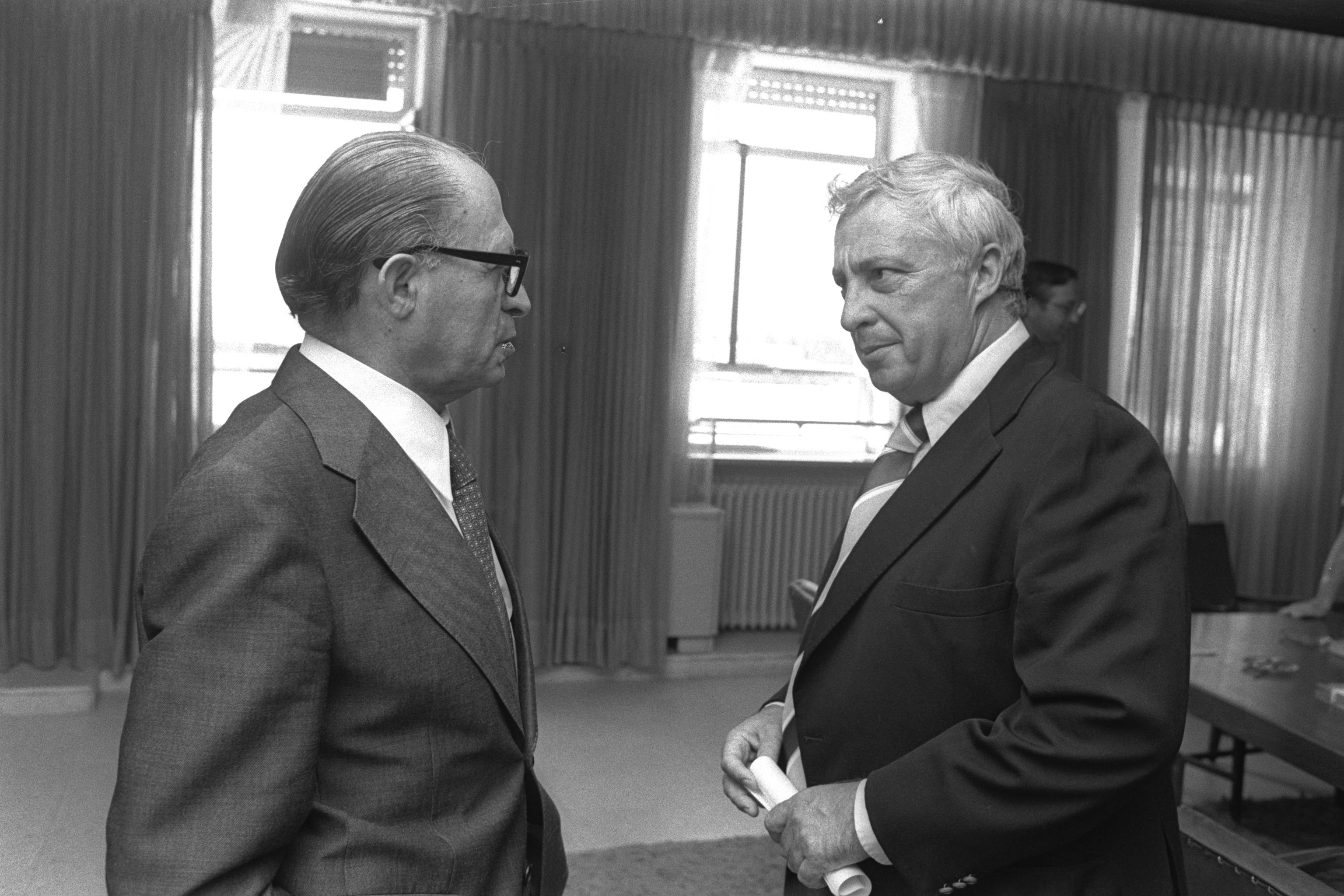
Prime Minister Menachem Begin with future Prime Minister Ariel Sharon

Ariel Sharon, Israel's defense minister, was the first to publicly disclose Israeli sale of military equipment to Iran during his visit to United States in May 1982. In a news conference in Paris on 28 September 1983, Sharon said that Israel was selling arms to Iran with the consent of United States. Israeli ambassador to the United States Moshe Arens said in October 1982 that Israeli arms sale to Iran was taking place with the consent of highest levels of US government. A report in March 1982 stated that Israeli officials admitted that arms had been sold to Tehran and Khomeini himself had approved of the arms deal with Israel.

In 1983 Israel sold more than $100 million worth of arms to Tehran. The volume or arms sale was so great that a special office was instituted in Cyprus to facilitate the arms transfer. The best known of the middle men facilitating the arms deal was Saudi billionaire Adnan Khashoggi. The best known Iranian middleman was Manucher Ghorbanifar.

In the spring of 1984, West German Chancellor Helmut Kohl complained to the US government about Israeli arms sales worth $500 million to Iran. Later in July 1984, Yaakov Nimrodi met in Zurich with Iranian officials and Rifaat al-Assad the brother of Syrian President Hafez al-Assad. The meeting resulted in an agreement to ship 40 truckloads of weapons a day from Israel to Iran, via Syria and Turkey. Similarly in 1984, one of Israel's many European arms dealers, who was based in Sweden, shipped hundreds of tons of explosives and dynamite worth over 500 million Swedish kronor by way of Argentina to Iran. By 1985, Danish cargo ships chartered by the Israeli government and private arms dealers had made over 600 trips carrying American-made arms between the Israeli harbor of Eilat on the Red Sea and the Iranian harbor of Bandar Abbas in the Persian Gulf.

=== Iran–Contra period (1985–1986) ===
Israel facilitated from 1985 to 1986 arms shipments from the United States to Iran as part of the Iran–Contra Affair.

The Iran–Contra Affair began in late 1984 when representatives of Israel and Iran met to discuss ways of opening an arms channel with the United States for sophisticated American-made weapons. The discussion was held in Israel between Iranian arms dealer Manucher Ghorbanifar and Israeli representatives: Yaakov Nimrodi, an arms dealer who was a former Israeli defense attaché in Iran; Al Schwimmer, a founder of Israel's aircraft industry who was close to then Prime Minister Shimon Peres; and David Kimche, the general director of the Israeli foreign ministry. Ghorbanifar said there were Iranian officials who sought a more pro-Western orientation and sales of sophisticated American-made weapons would help gain sway for them with Ayatollah Ruhollah Khomeini.

In 1986, five men with ties to Israel were also arrested attempting to sell $2.6 billion worth of arms to Iran in Bermuda. Others were arrested in New York on the same charges. At the center of the trial was retired Israeli general Avraham Bar-Am. The case came to be known as the Brokers of Death arms case. The Israeli government denied involvement.

== Destruction of Osirak reactor ==
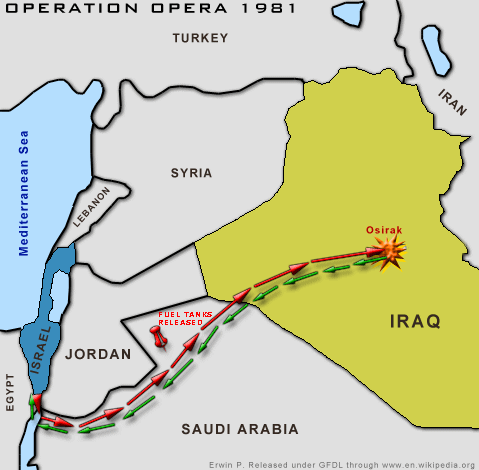
Scheme of Operation Opera which disabled Iraq's nuclear weapons program

On 7 June 1981, a squadron of Israeli Air Force F-16A fighter aircraft, with an escort of F-15As, bombed and heavily damaged the Osirak nuclear reactor in Iraq. Iran originally bombed the Osirak reactor in September 1980, but the attack only damaged secondary buildings. The reactor was part of Iraq's weapon program as had been reported on September 8, 1975, then-Vice President Saddam Hussein declared publicly that the acquisition of the French reactors was the first step in the production of an Arab atomic weapon. The deal with the French reportedly initially included the shipment of 7% enriched uranium, but was nixed after "heavy economic pressure" was exerted on the French from the oil-rich Iraqis to instead include 75 kilograms of 93% enriched uranium, the likes of which is theoretically sufficient for the production of "five or six" nuclear bombs, and would have put the Iraqis much closer to the production of such a weapon. The Iranian Revolution accelerated Saddam's interest in atomic bombs and he ordered his scientists directly, in December 1979, to build them. Political scientist Dan Reiter has argued that if Osirak had not been destroyed, Iraq would have become a nuclear state and Saddam would have taken over a large chunk of Iranian territory, as well as Kuwait. According to journalist Nicholas Kristof, had it not been for the later Israeli attack, "Iraq would have gained nuclear weapons in the 1980s, it might now have a province called Kuwait and a chunk of Iran, and the region might have suffered nuclear devastation." The United States would have preferred that Iraq, controlled by what they viewed as a less volatile regime than Iran, would replace Iran as a major "stabilizing force" in the region, and therefore refrained from objecting to the country's nuclear ambitions.

== Other aid ==
According to John Bulloch and Harvey Morris, the Israelis devised and manufactured the huge, lightweight polystyrene blocks which the Iranian assault forces carried with them to build instant makeshift causeways across the shallow Iraqi water defenses in front of Basra; Israel kept Iranian planes flying in spite of a lack of spares, and Israeli instructors taught Iranian commanders how to handle troops. Gerard Beau, a journalist for Luxembourg RTL, who was at the front line when the war broke out between Iran and Iraq, wrote that in 1980 around 350 Israeli technicians were working at Iranian airbases to help in the operation of F-4, F-5, and F-14 jets as well as train local specialists.

Despite Iranian leaders denouncing Israel at Friday prayers, Israel supplied instructors and non-armament help to Iran. Israeli military and civilian advisers arrived in Iran three days after the beginning of the war to assist Iran's military command. Many Israeli military advisers and technicians went on bilateral agreements to Iran. There were never less than around one hundred Israeli advisers and technicians in Iran at any time throughout the war, living in a carefully guarded and secluded camp just north of Tehran, where they remained even after the ceasefire.

In August 1982, Aerospace Daily reported that Israel's support was "crucial" to keeping Iran's air force flying against Iraq. Israeli sales included spare parts for U.S.-made F-4 Phantom jets. Newsweek reported that after an Iranian defector landed his F-4 Phantom jet in Saudi Arabia in 1984, intelligence experts determined that many of its parts had originally been sold to Israel, and had then been re-exported to Tehran in violation of U.S. law.

Israel assisted Iran in the sale of its oil. The Iranian government after the revolution faced significant difficulties selling oil to international markets as most European companies left Iran. International Israeli financier and trader Marc Rich sent one of his executives to Iran a week after the revolution, becoming the most important trader of Iranian oil for 15 years. Rich sold Iranian oil to Israel through a secret pipeline. Rich was also allegedly instrumental in the sale of arms to Iran, but none of the charges in Rich's 1983 indictment related to arms trading. For tax evasion, Rich was put on FBI's most wanted list for many years until Bill Clinton pardoned him in his last day in office. Former Mossad heads Avner Azular and Shabbtai Shevit both personally wrote to Clinton for his pardon.

== Goals ==
According to Ronen Bergman, Israel's goals were to: reestablish some influence in Iran which was lost when the Shah was defeated in 1979; prevent Iraq from conquering Iran as they feared a victorious Saddam Hussein, and create business for the Israeli weapons industry.

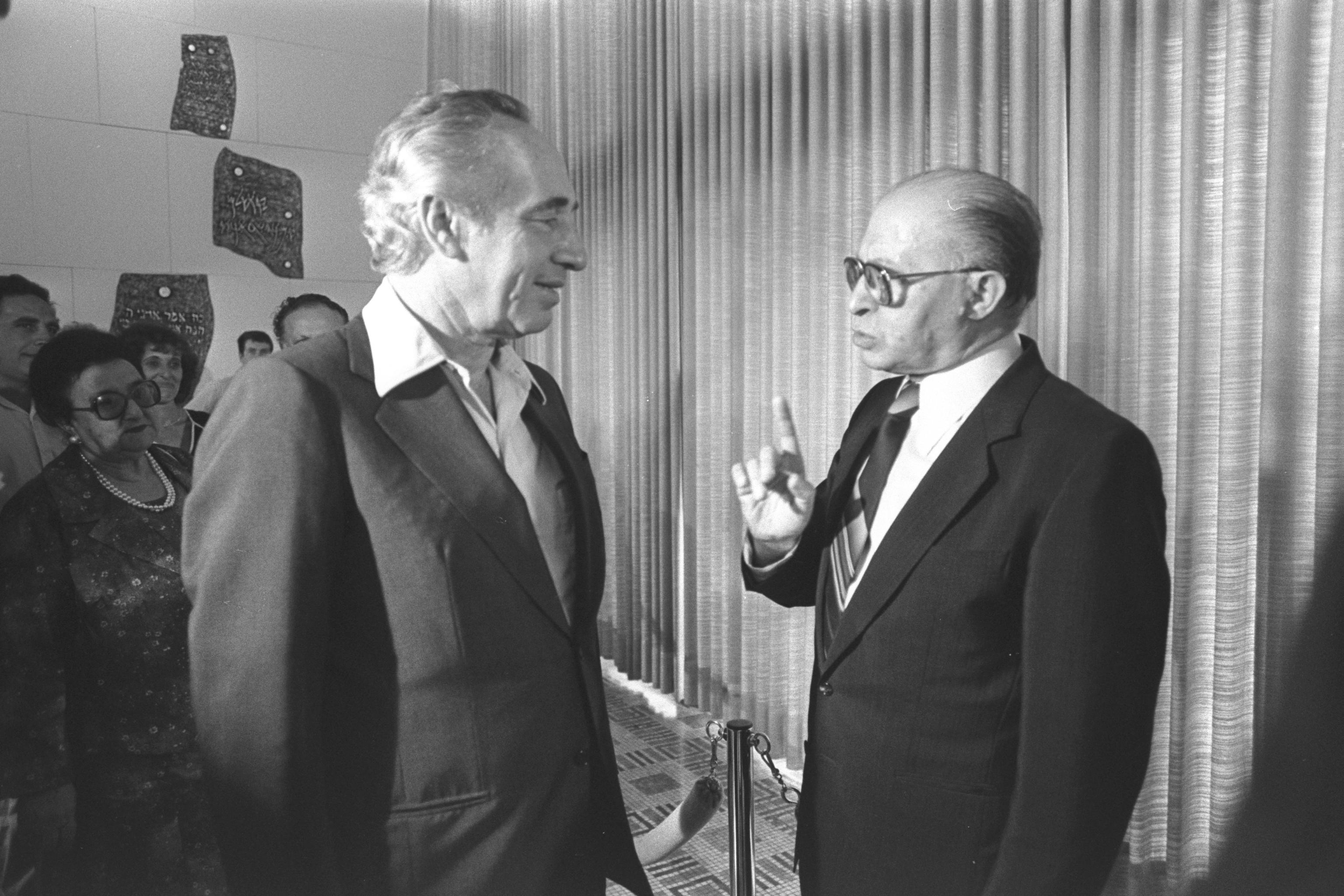
Israeli prime ministers Menahem Begin (right), Yitzhak Shamir (not shown), and Shimon Peres (left) were the key Israeli leaders during the war

Trita Parsi writes that Israel supplied Iran with arms and ammunition because it viewed Iraq as a danger to the peace process in the Middle East. Ariel Sharon believed it was important to "leave a small window open" to the possibility of good relations with Iran in the future. According to David Menashri of Tel Aviv University, a leading expert on Iran, "Throughout the 1980s, no one in Israel said anything about an Iranian threat – the word wasn't even uttered." Parsi explained in an interview with Diane Rehm that despite the anti-Israeli rhetoric publicly displayed by Iran, in actuality, the two nations secretly depended upon the support of one another to face the formidable opposition of both Iraq and the Soviet Union. He cites as evidence the fact that this relationship endured despite the ramped-up rhetoric that was brought about by the Islamic Revolution in Iran, up until the collapse of the Soviet Union and destruction of the Iraqi military by the U.S. in the Persian Gulf War, both in 1991. Though he claims that Iran long used Israel as a means to create unified pan-Islamic, anti-Israel sentiment through which all the Muslim countries in the region could be unified under Iranian leadership, Israel and Iran, he argues, only truly began to see each other as strategic rivals after the threat of Soviet Union fell away, and after Iraq no longer could serve as a power check in the region.

Another source argues that Israel saw the Persian Gulf War as an opportunity to ensure the safety of the Persian Jewish community which it believed was at risk. At the time of the revolution in Iran, there were 80,000 Jews in the country. They were a recognized minority along with Christians and Zoroastrians in Iran, which in general had suffered no persecution and had been able to continue their affairs undisturbed. The fundamentalism of Khomeini put all that at risk. Clandestine support of Iran ensured the safety of the Jewish community and allowed thousands to emigrate; it also contributed substantially to Iran's successful defense of its borders.

== Iranian denial ==
During and after the war, Iranian officials denied they had received help from Israel which they denounced as an "illegitimate state". Ayatollah Ruhollah Khomeini, leader of Iran during the war, angrily denied that Israeli arms were sent to Iran. In a speech on August 24, 1981, he maintained that Iran's enemies were trying to undermine the Islamic Revolution by spreading false rumors of Israeli-Iranian cooperation. He alleged that while Israel had bombed and destroyed Iraq's Osirak nuclear facilities in 1981, this was because Saddam Hussein was actually an ally of Israel who "forced" Israel to destroy his own nuclear facilities:

They are accusing us of importing arms from Israel. This is being said against a country which rose to oppose this condemned Zionist claim from the very beginning ... For over twenty years, in speeches and statements, we have spoken of Israel and its oppression, whereas a great many Islamic countries did not even take a step along this road in opposing Israel. This man Saddam who resorted to play-acting and, as reported, forced Israel to bomb his [nuclear] center in order to save himself from the disgrace he himself created by attacking Islamic Iran—his aim in doing this was to camouflage this crime and give the impression that Israel opposes Saddam, ... That is childish nonsense.

== See also ==
- International aid to combatants in the Iran–Iraq War
- Iran–Israel relations
- Iraq–Israel relations
- Israeli support for Hamas
