= Roy Furmark =

American businessman (1931–2001)

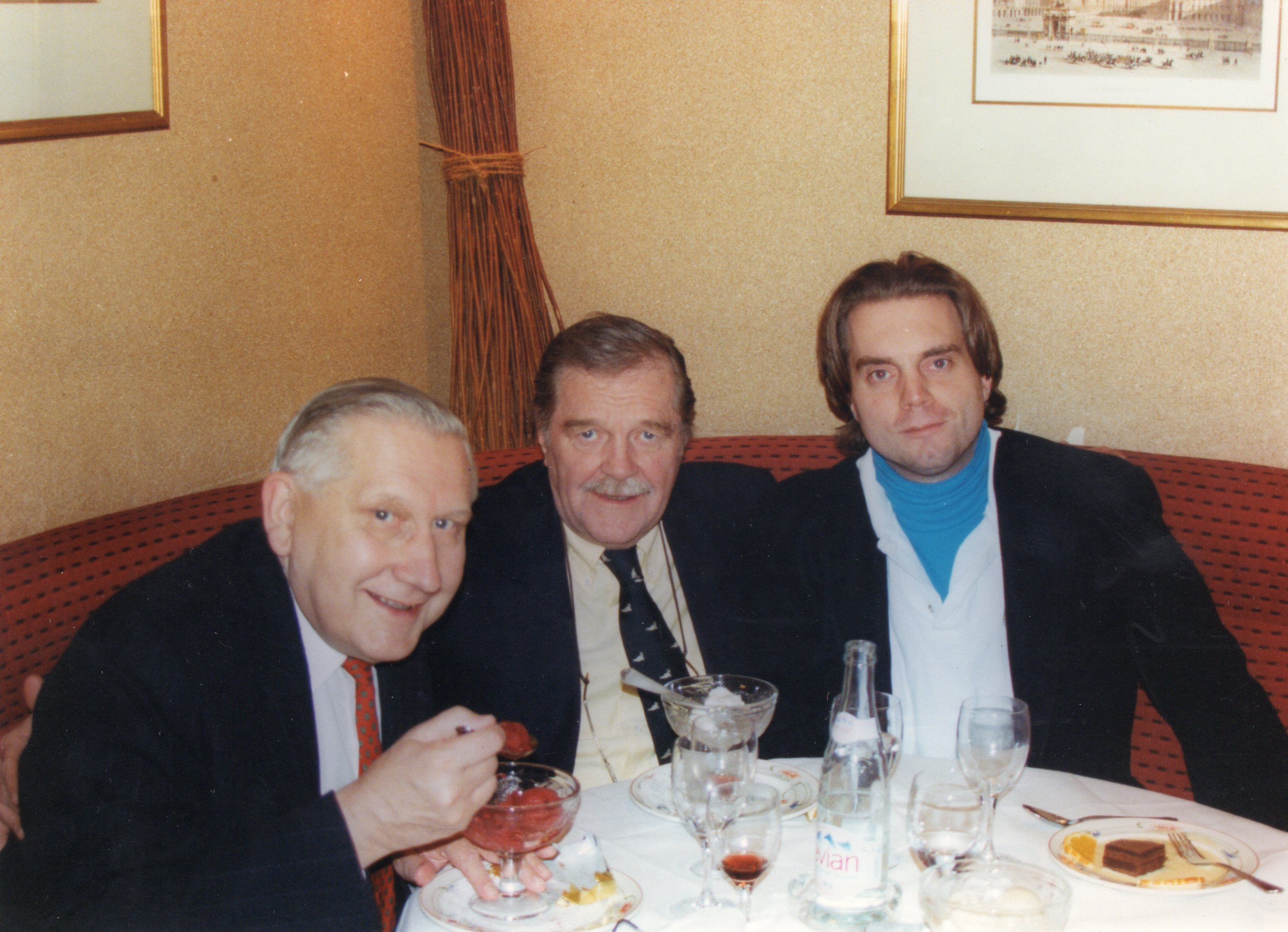
Roy M Furmark, Center, while at dinner meeting in Paris, France 1998

Roy M. Furmark (September 28, 1931 – January 4, 2001) was an American businessman who played a role in the Iran-Contra affair in a number of ways, including acting as a link between CIA Director William Casey and Saudi billionaire Adnan Khashoggi, who financed the arms deal at the center of the affair. In 1986 the Los Angeles Times reported that Furmark had known Casey and Khashoggi for about 20 years.

== Background and early career ==
Furmark was born in Brooklyn, graduated from Pace College with a degree in accounting, and after working at a number of accounting firms started a private practice in 1964. He began working with John Shaheen in 1966, who would later introduce him to William Casey. In the 1970s Furmark was vice-chairman of the board of the Newfoundland Refining Co., a Canadian venture (which built the Come By Chance Refinery) which Shaheen had been involved in. When the venture collapsed (at the time of its bankruptcy in 1976, it was Canada's largest bankruptcy), Furmark was one of those sued by creditors; the defendants eventually settled out of court in 1982.

== Iran-Contra affair ==
Furmark was a business associate of the Iranian Cyrus Hashemi, and in March 1980 introduced William Casey to Cyrus' brother Jamshid Hashemi in the context of the Hashemis' efforts to support US-Iranian negotiations over the Iran hostage crisis. A business partner of Cyrus Hashemi's, John Shaheen, was a former boss of Furmark's.

Furmark was an associate of Saudi billionaire Adnan Khashoggi, and had been an investor in a Panamanian company, Bayway, which Khashoggi and Hashemi had been partners in. Furmark also received a 10% stake in the World Trade Group for setting up with Khashoggi and Hashemi the planned venture (it never completed any deals) to trade various goods with Iran. In June 1985 Furmark introduced Khashoggi to Manucher Ghorbanifar, after which Khashoggi abandoned Hashemi and worked with Ghorbanifar to arrange the arms deals, and Hashemi became a US Customs informant, leading to the Brokers of Death arms case snaring several Khashoggi business associates.

On 7 October 1986 Furmark told CIA Director William Casey of the diversion of funds from arms sales to Iran, a month before the affair became public. Furmark, testifying to the Congressional Committees Investigating The Iran-Contra Affair in December 1986, said that Canadian investors in the Iranian arms deal were threatening to take legal action, which would expose the arrangement, although he later said that Khashoggi had misled him and it appeared that the money had come from a Cayman Islands bank, which was threatening to sue Khashoggi.

== Later life ==
In 1990 Furmark was sentenced to two years' probation for his role in the attempted sale of stolen Ashland Oil documents to Iran, which was attempting to sue Ashland over unpaid Iranian oil.
