= Cyrus Hashemi =

Iranian arms trader

- Born: 27 December 1938; Abadan, Iran
- Died: 21 July 1986 (aged 47); London, United Kingdom
- Citizenship: Iran; United States
- Occupation: Arms dealer
- Known for: Linked to 1980 October Surprise theory, Iran-Contra affair, and Brokers of Death arms case

Cyrus Hashemi (Persian: سیروس هاشمی; also spelled Hashimi; 27 December 1938 – 21 July 1986) was an Iranian arms dealer linked to the Iran-Contra affair, Brokers of Death arms case, and 1980 October Surprise theory. Robert Dreyfuss claimed Hashemi was a CIA and Mossad agent; Hashemi sued Dreyfuss and Lyndon LaRouche, whose Executive Intelligence Review had accused Hashemi of being linked to the alleged "funding of Iranian terrorism in the United States," with the case dismissed in June 1983 due to Hashemi's failure to respond to legal documents. Hashemi died from acute myeloblastic leukemia July 1986 in London.

== Early life and education ==
Cyrus Hashemi was born in Abadan located in Iran's Khuzestan province on December 27, 1938. His father was an engineer with the Anglo-Iranian Oil Company. He was the youngest of three brothers. His oldest brother was Jamshid Hashemi, and his other brother was Reza Hashemi. He was sent abroad as a teenager for his education like his older brothers. His brothers studied engineering. He studied economics at Balliol College of the University of Oxford and spoke Persian, French, and English.

== Finance career ==
In 1960, he returned to Iran and worked as an economist with the National Iranian Oil Company (NIOC) before entering government service the following year. He served in the Ministry of Water and Power – later renamed the Ministry of Energy – until 1964, where he was the director of finance. He then went into business as the head of International Development Corporation of Iran and was also a partner at Whinney-Murray Company.

Hashemi and his brother Jamshid Hashemi were subsequently persecuted by the shah’s SAVAK during the White Revolution, a series of reforms beginning in 1963. Cyrus Hashemi left Iran in 1968 and moved first to Paris and later to Geneva, where he remained for a year. Over the next decade, he worked as an international merchant and banker with offices in New York, Paris, and London, while maintaining contacts in Iran. He was involved in various European and Caribbean-based financial ventures, many of which became involved in civil litigation. He was also head of First Gulf Bank and Trust.

The Hashemi brothers were active in the anti-shah movement that developed in Iran during the 1970s. They had connections with Admiral Ahmad Madani, a Western-educated naval officer, member of the National Front, and prominent critic of the shah's government. Madani was exiled in 1970 and later served as defense minister following the 1979 Iranian Revolution, which the Hashemi brothers also supported. Following its success, Jamshid Hashemi was appointed to oversee the national radio network, where he worked with Hassan Karroubi, the brother of Mehdi Karroubi. Hashemi said he was a cousin of Akbar Hashemi Rafsanjani, an aide to Ayatollah Khomeini who was elected Speaker of the Iranian Parliament in 1980.

== Iran hostage crisis (1979–81) ==
=== Back channel diplomacy ===
Following the 1979 seizure of the U.S. Embassy in Tehran, Hashemi offered to help negotiate the release of the American hostages. CIA intelligence officer Charles Cogan met with Hashemi and his brother Jamshid in New York on 5 January, 1980, and in the context of the Iran hostage crisis the Hashemis "promised to put U.S. officials in touch with top officials in the Tehran government, including a family member of the Ayatollah Ruhollah Khomeini", but asked for financial support for the campaign of presidential candidate Ahmad Madani ahead of the 1980 Iranian elections later in January.

The CIA provided $500,000 in cash on 17 January, which was rejected in favour of a wire transfer via Switzerland. Hashemi later returned $290,000 to Cogan, via his lawyer John Stanley Pottinger office, after Cogan had determined that less than $100,000 had been spent for its intended purpose. On July 2, 1980, Hashemi traveled with Pottinger to Madrid. They went, with the knowledge of the State Department, to meet Reza Passindideh, the nephew of Ayatollah Ruhollah Khomeini, in an effort to establish an informal communication channel with the Iranian leadership during the crisis. Although the meeting initially appeared promising, it did not lead to a diplomatic breakthrough, and the Carter administration pursued other diplomatic channels.

=== October surprise 1980 ===
Ahmad Madani later testified to the House October Surprise Task Force in 1992 that he had told off Hashemi for suggesting to collaborate with the Republicans during the 1980 United States presidential election behind President Jimmy Carter's back. He said Hashemi had offered to bring William Casey, the manager of the Reagan–Bush campaign, to a meeting to discuss a Republican campaign hostage deal.

On September 6, 1980, the Agence France-Presse reported Iranian Foreign Minister Sadegh Ghotbzadeh as saying that he had "information" proving that the "Reagan camp was trying hard to block a solution of the [hostage] problem before the elections."

=== Illegal arms transfers ===
The Federal Bureau of Investigation (FBI) in the fall of 1980 began investigating illegal arms-related activities by the Hashemi brothers. From September 1980 to February 1981, wiretaps were placed in the New York offices of the First Gulf Bank and Trust Company, of which Hashemi was the head. The bank had handled clandestine money transfers for the Iranian government, with Ahmad Madani, then the defense minister, ordering $30–$35m transferred to an account there in late 1979.

According to a federal indictment based on electronic surveillance of Cyrus Hashemi's office, Hashemi discussed Iranian requests for arms shipments with his lawyer, John Stanley Pottinger, a former Justice Department official who served in the Nixon and Ford administrations, on October 21, 1980. On December 10, 1980, Pottinger spoke with him and his brother Reza Hashemi about arranging such shipments through shell companies to conceal the parties and destination. During this period, Hashemi also proposed locating the assets of the former shah, an initiative of interest of Iranian parliamentary leader Rafsanjani, and one of the original points of consideration in the U.S.–Iran hostage negotiations.

=== Reagan inauguration 1981 ===
On January 20, 1981, the day Ronald Reagan was inaugurated, the hostages in Tehran were released. The Algerian ambassador told the Iranian President Abolhassan Bani-Sadr a few weeks later in a conversation about the Algiers Accords that the Algerians "were intermediaries in the [Iranian government's] agreement with Carter, but not the other one, the one Beheshti and Rafsanjani concluded with Reagan."

On February 9, the Reagan administration instructed the FBI to discontinue surveillance of Hashemi. The FBI headquarters also rejected a request from the bureau's New York office for a search warrant for Hashemi's office. The New York office wrote in a response telex that it "respectively [sic] disagrees" with FBI headquarters' conclusion that executing the warrant was premature. The telex noted that when electronic surveillance ended on February 13, the subjects were "actively engaged in negotiations" for the purchase of "machine guns, surface-to-air missiles, air-to-air missiles, and other items for use by the Iranian military".

The Hashemi brothers were indicted on July 17, 1984, for illegal arms sales, while Pottinger was not charged by the U.S. Attorney for the Southern District of New York Rudolph Giuliani's office. On May 16, Cyrus Hashemi canceled a Concorde flight from London to New York after the Justice Department alerted his attorney, former Attorney General Elliott Richardson, to the forthcoming indictment. The Central Intelligence Agency (CIA) warned Jashmid Hashemi that FBI agents were preparing to arrest him, prompting him to flee the United States for the United Kingdom where he continued arms trading and developed a relationship with the UK's Secret Intelligence Service (MI6). On May 17, Reza Hashemi, who had been living in Europe since 1981, was arrested by U.S. Customs agents at Kennedy International Airport after custom agent Joseph King posing as an American businessman lured him back to the United States with an offer to sell prohibited goods to Iran. A potential case against Pottinger was complicated by the disappearance of three FBI tapes in which he discussed arms sales.

== London business (1982–86) ==
By the mid-1980s, Hashemi, although maintaining an appearance of wealth, such as commuting to his London office in a gold-trimmed Rolls-Royce, was facing bankruptcy, in part due to major gambling losses sustained in London casinos. By mid-1985 Hashemi had partnered with Adnan Khashoggi in the "World Trade Group", "a joint venture ... that was seeking to trade farm equipment, oil and military weapons with Iran." Roy Furmark was also involved.

=== Iran–Contra affair ===
In June 1985 Hashemi approached William Casey with an arms-for-hostages plan. The Los Angeles Times reported in 1988 that "according to newly declassified CIA and State Department memos, Hashemi approached then-CIA Director William J. Casey with an arms-for-hostages plan of his own that was strikingly similar to the one that would soon be embraced by the White House as its secret Iran arms initiative." A June 1985 CIA memo documented a call regarding a potential arms-for-hostages deal from Hashemi to Shaheen. The Times said in 1988 it had discovered that Hashemi was meeting with Adnan Khashoggi and Manucher Ghorbanifar, and that Hashemi's efforts to arrange a deal collapsed in August 1985 due to Kashoggi's competing efforts to arrange US access to Ghorbanifar via Robert McFarlane.

=== Brokers of Death arms case ===
In 1986 Hashemi acted as a government informant in a four-month sting operation for the US Customs Service, resulting in the Brokers of Death arms case, which the Los Angeles Times described in 1988 as "the largest arms conspiracy prosecution ever brought by the Justice Department". Hashemi had agreed to act as an informant in exchange for the dropping of arms smuggling charges against him.

== Death ==
Hashemi died on 21 July 1986 after becoming ill with a rare and "virulent" form of leukemia diagnosed only two days earlier. Although the cause of death was officially attributed to leukemia, there were suspicions of foul play. Following Hashemi's death, a congressional investigation was launched, and a Senate investigator made two trips to England to conduct inquiries. A U.S. government informant who had worked with Hashemi claimed that Customs Service officials had informed him that Hashemi may have been "bumped off" to safeguard the operation's confidentiality. An unidentified source from the committee investigating the arms deals asserted that they would be neglecting their responsibility if they did not follow up on what seemed to be mysterious death.

The United States Customs Service investigated allegations made by an associate of Hashemi, Houshang Lavi, that one of their special agents was involved in the death of Hashemi. In December 1987, the UCCS reported: "This investigation has disclosed no information which tends to substantiate the allegation by Houshang Lavi that Special Agent Joseph King or any other Customs official was responsible for, or knowledgeable of any of the circumstances surrounding the death of Hashemi." I.E. West, one of the most experienced and respected forensic pathologists in the United Kingdom, performed an autopsy witnessed by two officials from New Scotland Yard as well as a representative from the United States Customs Service attache in London. West reported that Hashemi died of acute myoblastic leukemia, and said that the condition could not have been induced in Hashemi through drugs or other means. The House October Surprise Task Force investigating the 1980 October Surprise theory reported that they "found no evidence to contradict West's conclusion regarding Hashemi's death."
