= William Northrop =

American military historian, investigator and writer (1944–2021)

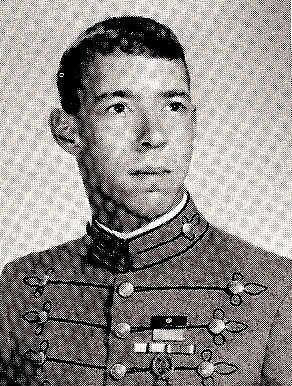
- The Citadel, 1966 "Sphinx" yearbook
- Born: William Warren Northrop; May 24, 1944; Charlotte, North Carolina, U.S.
- Died: July 14, 2021 (aged 77); Greensboro, North Carolina, U.S.
- Education: Oak Ridge Military Institute; The Citadel
- Occupations: Military historian; investigator; writer
- Known for: Role in Brokers of Death arms case
- Children: 4

William Warren "Will" Northrop (May 24, 1944 – July 14, 2021) was an American-born military historian, investigator and writer. He was best known for the controversy regarding his claims of military and combat service in the Vietnam War, and prior to that for his role in the so-called "Brokers of Death" arms case, a precursor to the Iran–Contra scandal in 1986. He was a writer and wrote articles over the years for such diverse venues as Penthouse, New Dimensions magazine, and The Jerusalem Post. He also wrote several articles in Recall, the magazine of the North Carolina Military Historical Society, mostly battle analyses.

== Early life ==
Northrop was the son of Robert Houston Northrop and Margaret Presson Northrop. He was born in Charlotte, North Carolina, where he attended public schools. In 9th grade, he attended a New England prep school for one year, but returned to North Carolina for high school. He was sent to Oak Ridge Military Institute (class of 1962) and from there to The Citadel (class of 1966) where he studied history.

== Career ==
Northrop claimed that after graduating from The Citadel in May 1966, he joined the United States Army, serving almost three years, including a tour in South Vietnam and being badly wounded at the Battle of Lang Vei in February 1968. However, since his claims were first publicized in 1992 their validity has been questioned by investigators, historians, and veterans of battles he claimed to have participated in.

In 1980, he was in California studying for a graduate degree and working part-time as an investigator for the California Public Defender. He was asked by Mary Welcome, attorney for Wayne Williams, to head up the defense investigation in the Atlanta child murders case. Williams was convicted in February 1982 and in 1984, with the appeals exhausted, Northrop penned an op-ed for Penthouse magazine in which he covered the facts of the case.

=== Brokers of Death arms case ===
In April 1986, Northrop and four other individuals were arrested at the Hamilton Airport in Bermuda at the request of the United States and remanded to Her Majesty's Casemate Prison. At the same time, five other individuals were arrested in New York and charged as co-conspirators. In what would be called the "Brokers of Death" case by US Attorney, Rudolph Giuliani, and Commissioner of US Customs, William Von Raab, it would be touted in the media as the "largest arms case in US History." In Israel the case became known as the "Passover Plot" and was viewed as another attempt by the Reagan Administration to embarrass the Jewish State while massive arms sales to the Arab States were pending Congressional approval. On May 29, 1986, the "Bermuda Five" were extradited via New York to London (they were still in British custody), where they were arrested by US Customs agents.

In court hearings, Northrop was described by The New York Times as "an American living in Tel Aviv" and by the US Government as "a high-ranking Israeli Intelligence official who was known to travel on 11 different passports." Northrop was identified as the defendant that demanded from the putative Iranian buyers the release of four Israelis being held in Lebanon as a quid pro quo for the arms deal.

The defendants in the "Brokers of Death" were indicted on various charges including conspiracy to violate the Arms Export Control Act, conspiracy to make false statements in connection with proposed arms sales, wire fraud, and mail fraud.

In November 1986, Northrop was interviewed by Mike Wallace on 60 Minutes.

By January 1987, nine of the "Brokers of Death" were released to return home to Europe and the Middle East, although they were still on bail. Northrop was sent to the Western District of Oklahoma where Judge Lawrence Walsh, the Independent Counsel for Iran–Contra Matters, was located. Northrop "lawyered up" and refused to be interviewed while his criminal case was still pending.

In January 1989, all charges against Northrop and his fellow defendants were dropped. Northrop returned to Israel. According to a 1986 New York Times article, Northrop reportedly told people involved in the arms deal that "he was related to the Northrop aircraft family", which was inaccurate.

=== October Surprise theory ===
In November 1988, Northrop signed an affidavit in the case of Gary Howard and Ronald Tucker v. United States claiming that the United States replenished hundreds of millions of dollars' worth of military equipment shipped from Israel to Iran. According to the House October Surprise Task Force investigating allegations that officials tied to the campaign of Ronald Reagan successfully negotiated with the government of Iran for a solution to the Iran hostage crisis that would not occur until after the 1980 United States presidential election in order to prevent President Jimmy Carter from getting an electoral boost, Northrop's allegations of arms shipments had been cited as "part of the October surprise quid pro quo". In their 1993 report, the Task Force cited Northrop's claims to having been an Israeli intelligence agent - an association that the government of Israeli denied - and his close ties to Richard J. Brenneke as problematic for the reliability of stories related to Northrop. During Brenneke's 1990 perjury trial, Northrop claimed he had known Brenneke for twenty years and was with him in Lahore, Pakistan in the summer of 1980; however, Brenneke's credit card information conclusively showed that he never traveled to Pakistan in that time period and his calendar clearly indicated that he first met Northrop in 1987. The Task Force investigated the specific claims within Northrop's affidavit and concluded that "...Northrop's assertions are untrue and that any reliance upon him for the proposition that arms sales between Israel and Iran after January 1981 were part of an October surprise quid pro quo is misplaced."

=== Israel ===
Northrop returned to Israel in 1992. He was later identified as attempting to get $70,000,000 from the Israeli Government in support of his attempt to build an aircraft manufacturing plant in the city of Arad. When Israeli civil and military officials examining his plans expressed skepticism over the viability of the project, with one referring to it as "summer dreams", Northrop threatened to take his plant to Holland where they would be able to "Sell planes to Arabs and Iran". Despite his attempts the project never received funding and never came to pass in any country.

== Military service controversy ==
In the 1992 book Saigon to Jerusalem, Northrop claimed to have graduated from The Citadel to serve as a US Army Special Forces officer in the Vietnam War. He included in the book detailed accounts of his military and combat service, and in particular claims of participating in and being wounded at the Battle of Lang Vei. Once this book was published, numerous individuals began to challenge the accuracy and legitimacy of his claims, including veterans of battles at which he claimed to have been present, as well as military historians and investigators. Many of Northrop's claims were investigated in the 1998 book Stolen Valor: How the Vietnam Generation Was Robbed of its Heroes and its History and, in the opinion of the book's authors, his claims were found to be inaccurate and misleading, and they described him as a "pretender."

Northrop's claims to have participated in the Battle of Lang Vei have been a particular focus of criticism. The Battle of Lang Vei has been extensively documented in U.S. military records and subsequent historical accounts from the surviving veterans. There were only 24 Americans present at the battle according to all records, and Northrop's name does not appear in the official records of the battle, nor in any of the accounts put forth by historians since the battle. Not one of the confirmed survivors of the battle recall Northrop being there or meeting him at all, and one veteran of the battle whose name does appear in official records and accounts, Paul Longgrear, has publicly stated of Northrop's claims to have fought at Lang Vei that "He's lying. The whole thing is a lie."

A search of military records via the US Freedom of Information Act (FOIA) by the authors of Stolen Valor revealed not only that there was no record of Northrop's presence at the Battle of Lang Vei, but that there was no record that he ever served in the United States Army or any other branch of the US Military in any capacity. A subsequent FOIA request initiated by the Associated Press in 2011 could also find no evidence of Northrop having any military service record whatsoever in the United States, after what was termed an "extensive" search of the National Archives and a check with the Federal Bureau of Investigation.

A roster of all US Army officers at the time Northrop claims to have served lists no officer by the last name Northrop.

The US Army Special Forces Association has no record of Northrop ever serving in Special Forces in any capacity.

When he was interviewed for Saigon to Jerusalem, Northrop gave a DD Form 214 supporting his service claims to the book's author, Eric Lee. During his investigation of Northrop's claims while researching Stolen Valor, author B.G. Burkett obtained a copy of this DD-214 form from Lee. The document had numerous errors and discrepancies that, coupled with the fact that there is no corroboration of any military service in any official records, led many experts to judge it a forgery. Among the errors and discrepancies in the document:

- The document was produced with multiple typewriters. While US Army units sometimes created blank documents in the header with information that was always the same to save time, Northrop's DD-214 had multiple fonts outside the header in sections that would have been prepared all at one time and are unique to the individual record, something possibly indicative of a person taking an existing DD-214 and altering it at a later date.
- The document shows entry and discharge dates which do not match Northrop's claimed total period of service.
- The document lists his job title as "SF LDR," or Special Forces Leader; no such designation or position title existed at the time of his claimed service.
- The document claimed Northrop's unit of assignment was MAAG-VN (Military Assistance Advisory Group - Vietnam), this is impossible because MAAG-VN ceased to exist in 1964, 2 years before Northrop claims to have arrived in Vietnam.
- The document lists Northrop as receiving the "National Defense Medal", no such medal exists. The National Defense Service Medal is the closest named US award.
- The document lists Northrop earning a "Ranger Badge", no such award exists. The Ranger Tab is awarded to graduates of the US Army Ranger School, however there is no record of Northrop having attended or graduated the school.
- The document lists that Northrop received a Combat Infantry Badge (Second Award). The CIB is issued only once per conflict or eligibility period. The only way Northrop could have qualified for a CIB 2nd Award is to have also served in the Korean War, when he was 6 to 9 years old.
- The document lists that he was given a Croix de Guerre, a French Army award. While US Soldiers have been awarded the Croix de Guerre for heroism in conflicts where they were allied with the French, no Croix de Guerre was ever issued by the nation of France to any US soldier in Vietnam, and the last French soldiers left Vietnam 10 years prior to the date Northrop claimed to have received it.
- The document claimed one year, nine months and 19 days of overseas service in Vietnam. Northrop claimed to have been wounded at the Battle of Lang Vei on February 7, 1968, and evacuated from Vietnam shortly after due to his wounds. This would have required him to have begun service in Vietnam in September 1966. However, Northrop claimed to have graduated from The Citadel in May 1966, which would have allowed him less than 4 months to complete Infantry Officers Basic Course, Basic Airborne School, Ranger School, and Special Forces Qualification Training before departing to Vietnam. These courses combined would have required a minimum of 16 months to complete. Even if he had not attended the Special Forces Qualification Course, the combination of Infantry Officers Basic Course, Ranger School and Basic Airborne School is in excess of 6+ months and would have been impossible to complete in the time frame Northrop describes in the document.

Northrop was employed as the Commandant of Cadets at Oak Ridge Military Academy in the late summer and autumn of 2011, having convinced academy leaders of his credentials. He abruptly resigned from the position on the same day the parent of a student questioned his credentials. When questioned by a reporter about the controversy over his military service claims and abrupt departure as the school's commandant, Northrop's quoted response was "I'm not running for president. I'm not explaining anything."

In addition to his claims of service in the US Army, Northrop also claimed to have served in the Israel Defense Forces, but a records search by the IDF did not find any evidence that he had served in the Israeli Defense Forces.

Northrop's case has been cited by activists seeking to pass laws to criminalize false claims of military service at both the state and federal level, including in Nevada.

== Family and death ==
Northrop was divorced and had four children. He died on July 14, 2021, aged 77, following complications from surgery.

== Sources ==
- Burkett, B.G., and Glenna Whitley. Stolen Valor: How the Vietnam Generation Was Robbed of its Heroes and its History. Verity Press: Dallas, Texas, 1998.
- Lee, Eric. Saigon to Jerusalem: Conversations with U.S. Veterans of the Vietnam War who Emigrated to Israel. McFarland & Company: Jefferson, North Carolina, 1992.
