= Joseph King =

Joseph King may refer to:

- Joseph King (politician) (1860–1943), British politician, Member of Parliament for North Somerset 1910–1918
- J. C. King (Joseph Caldwell King, 1900–1977), CIA officer
- Joseph E. King (born 1945), American politician in the state of Washington
- Joseph F. King (born c. 1948), U.S. Customs agent
- Joseph King (baseball) (born 2001), American baseball player

== See also ==
- Joe King (disambiguation)
