= Joe King =

Joe King may refer to:

== People ==
- Joe King (actor) (1883–1951), American silent-film actor
- Joe King (trade unionist) (1914–1989), British trade unionist
- Joe King (safety) (born 1968), former NFL defensive back
- Joe King (American football coach) (born c. 1948), American former college football coach
- Joe Hill (writer) (born 1972), American author, born Joseph Hillström King
- Joe King (musician) (born 1980), guitarist for the band The Fray
- Joe King, real name of Joe Queer, guitarist and lead singer for the band The Queers
- Joe King, narrator of Why Korea?
- Joe King, Mister Leather Europe, 2016

== Characters ==
- Joe King (The Beano), a character in the UK comic The Beano
- Joe King, hero of the video game Flight of the Amazon Queen

== See also ==
- Jo King, triathlete
- Joe the King, a 1999 American drama film
- Joey King (born 1999), actress
- Joseph King (disambiguation)
- King (surname)
