= Lawrence Barcella =

American lawyer (1945–2010)

E. Lawrence Barcella, Jr., often known as Larry Barcella (23 May 1945 – 4 November 2010) was an Assistant United States Attorney for the District of Columbia (1971–1986) and a criminal defense lawyer in private practice (1986–2010), specializing in white-collar crime.

== Background ==
Barcella graduated in history from Dartmouth College in 1967, and from Vanderbilt University Law School in 1970. Barcella sought an internship at the Justice Department in his second year of law school, but with none available, was offered a full-time job on graduation instead.

== Career ==
=== Assistant US Attorney (1971–1986) ===
Barcella joined the District of Columbia U.S. Attorney's Office in 1971, shortly after graduating from law school. Barcella handled a number of high-profile terrorism cases, and in 2010 The Washington Post said that he became in effect "the Justice Department's de facto lead terrorism prosecutor." These cases included the Letelier assassination (1976), the twin bombings in Beirut in 1983 of a US barracks and the US embassy, and the 1985 Achille Lauro hijacking. His best known case, however, was his pursuit of Edwin P. Wilson in 1982, where Barcella "staged a covert business deal that was actually a sting operation and lured Wilson into flying from Libya to the Dominican Republic", from where Wilson was extradited.

In 1985 Barcella gave a legal opinion to an unnamed government official on giving go-ahead to an Iran-Contra-related weapons shipment: "a private $5 million shipment of Soviet-bloc rifles, machine guns and grenade launchers to the Nicaraguan contras – 10 months after Congress had cut off government support to the contras." Barcella's boss, when first asked about the opinion, said "Assistant U.S. attorneys do not issue legal opinions on arms shipments... Larry would never have done that. ... It's a quagmire for any prosecutor to get into that stuff."

Barcella left the US Attorney's Office in June 1986.

=== Private practice ===
Barcella was a partner at Laxalt, Washington, Perito & Dubuc before moving to Katten Muchin & Zavis in July 1991. At Washington, Perito & Dubuc he played "a key role in BCCI's legal defense following the money laundering indictment in Tampa." According to the Senate BCCI report, Barcella worked directly with Paul Laxalt, then a partner in the law firm and chairman of the 1980 Reagan election campaign, on the BCCI account, which earned the company $2.16m from October 1988 to August 1990. Other clients included Lyn Nofziger, Melvyn R. Paisley, and José Blandón.

In 1992 Barcella also acted as lead counsel for the House October Surprise Task Force, having been hired in March 1992 by Task Force chairman Lee H. Hamilton.

Barcella was later a partner at law firm Paul Hastings.

== Awards ==
- Harold J. Sullivan Award of the Assistant United States Attorney Association (1979)
- John Marshall Award for Outstanding Achievement in Litigation of the U.S. Department of Justice (1983)
