= Jamshid Hashemi =

Iranian arms dealer

- Born: Iran
- Died: 2013
- Other name: Hashimi
- Citizenship: Iran; United States
- Occupation: Arms dealer
- Known for: Convicted of fraud in the UK in 1999; 1980 October Surprise theory Iran–Contra affair

Jamshid Hashemi (Note: Hashemi used a variety of aliases, including Mohammed Al Balanian, Mohamed Balanian, Mario Cabrini, Abdula Hashemi, Abdullah Hashemi, Mohammed Ali Hashemi, Jamshid Khalaj, James Khan, and Jamshid H. Naini.) (died 2013) was an Iranian-born trader in arms and other commodities convicted of fraud in the UK in 1999. Hashemi had a 9-year relationship with the UK's Secret Intelligence Service (MI6), beginning soon after his arrival in the UK in 1984. Hashemi and his brother Cyrus Hashemi played a role in the 1980 October Surprise affair (Jamshid later testified to the House October Surprise Task Force in 1992) and in the mid-1980s Iran-Contra affair.

== Early life and education ==
Hashemi was born in Iran. His father was an engineer with the Anglo-Iranian Oil Company. He was the oldest of three brothers. His youngest brother was Cyrus Hashemi, and his other brother was Reza Hashemi. He was sent abroad as a teenager for his education like his other brothers. He studied civil engineering in England.

== Career ==
=== Construction business ===
In Iran Hashemi had a construction business.

He and his brother Cyrus Hashemi were active in the anti-shah movement that developed in Iran during the 1970s. They had connections with Admiral Ahmad Madani, a Western-educated naval officer, member of the National Front, and prominent critic of the shah's government. Madani was exiled in 1970 and later served as defense minister following the 1979 Iranian Revolution, which the Hashemi brothers supported. Following its success, Jamshid Hashemi was appointed to oversee the national radio network, where he worked with Hassan Karroubi, the brother of Mehdi Karroubi.

Hashemi and his brother Cyrus went on to play a role in the 1980 October Surprise affair (Jamshid later testified to the House October Surprise Task Force in 1992) and in the Iran-Contra affair. Cyrus Hashemi said the Hashamis were distant cousins of Akbar Hashemi Rafsanjani, an aide to Ayatollah Khomeini who was elected Speaker of the Iranian Parliament in 1980.

=== Involvement with the CIA (1980–84) ===
In January 1980, John Shaheen, a business associate of Jamshid's brother Cyrus and a close friend of Bill Casey future CIA director in the Reagan administration, helped Jamshid obtain a US visa. Upon arriving in the US, Hashemi set up RRC Co Inc in Stamford, Connecticut, which Hashemi described in an affidavit as "an import-export company ... (which) originally dealt in commodities such as rice and sugar, construction machinery parts and Oriental rugs".

Amid the ongoing Iran hostage crisis, Hashemi and his brother Cyrus offered to help the Carter administration negotiate the release of the American hostages seized at the US Embassy in Tehran in November 1979. On January 5, 1980, Jasmid and Cyrus met with CIA intelligence officer Charles Cogan in New York. In the context of the Iran hostage crisis, the Hashemis "promised to put US officials in touch with top officials in the Tehran government, including a family member of the Ayatollah Ruhollah Khomeini", but asked for financial support for presidential candidate Ahmad Madani's campaign in the 1980 Iranian elections. At the State Department's urging, the CIA agreed to provide the brothers with $500,000 for the covert funding of Madani's campaign. On January 25, Madani lost the election to Abolhassan Banisadr. Cyrus Hashemi later returned $290,000 to Cogan, via his lawyer John Stanley Pottinger office, after Cogan had determined that less than $100,000 had been spent for its intended purpose.

Towards the end of 1980 Hashemi was approached by a contact on behalf of the Iranian Air Force in regards to acquiring aircraft spare parts in the United States. Hashemi's Stamford, Connecticut company shipped millions of dollars' worth of spare parts and related goods to Iran, with billing handled via a London office. RRC's operations ceased in late 1981 in the United States over a dispute between partners regarding allocation of profits. Hashemi subsequently directed his arms business from London.

=== Involvement with MI6 (1984–93) ===
In July 1984, after being warned by the Central Intelligence Agency (CIA) that Federal Bureau of Investigation (FBI) agents were about to arrest him, Hashemi, who was in the United States at the time, left to the UK where he developed soon after a relationship with the UK's Secret Intelligence Service (MI6) which would last nine years. Hashemi broke off the relationship in 1993 after the UK Government refused to issue him a British passport. At one time Hashemi gave the UK Conservative Party "£55,000 after meeting Margaret Thatcher at the home of the then foreign secretary, Geoffrey Howe." Hashemi deals that MI6 approved of included the supply of £350 million worth of Silkworm missiles from China to Iran in 1987 (the agency had supported this by sending an agent to China in 1985 to help arrange the deal) and the transfer of Portuguese 155mm ammunition.

In July 1997 Hashemi was arrested in Dublin whilst travelling to the US for a second triple heart bypass. He was released in February 1999, having pleaded guilty to three fraud charges and one of using a false passport, while four charges were dropped to avoid UK security matters being aired in open court. At the time of his release The Guardian said that "A source close to the case yesterday described MI6 as lucky." The judge in the case described Hashemi as a "ruthless international conman", with the Serious Fraud Office accusing Hashemi of setting up companies to defraud suppliers of at least £3m using non-existent commodity deals with Iran. The judge also noted that the three-year sentence would have been longer had Hashemi not had a record of supplying "valuable information" to MI6, as attested in court by Hashemi's anonymous case officers. Hashemi's victims included the US trading firm Octagon, which at the time of the 1994 deal was listed on the NASDAQ.
