= Richard J. Brenneke =

American businessman

Richard John Brenneke (December 5, 1941 – July 23, 2015) was an American businessman who testified in 1988 that he had worked in Southeast Asia with the Central Intelligence Agency's Air America, among other roles.

The CIA publicly disavowed Brenneke's claimed affiliation with the Agency. Brenneke testified to the United States Senate's Kerry Committee on allegations of CIA drug trafficking, and his evidence was considered by the House October Surprise Task Force on the 1980 October Surprise affair. The Kerry Committee report indicated Brenneke did not have the CIA connections he claimed to possess. The Task Force's report stated that Brenneke "played a central role in falsely propagating the October Surprise allegations for financial and person reasons".

== Early life ==
Brenneke was the oldest of Richard W. and M. Patricia Brenneke's four sons. His father founded a real estate and property management company in Portland, Oregon. He graduated from Jesuit High School in Beaverton, Oregon in 1960, then earned a B.A. degree from Seattle University in 1964 and a M.A. degree from University of Toronto in 1968.

== Career ==
As of 1986, Brenneke was reported to have been a former teacher at St. John's University and the president of a property management firm in Lake Oswego, Oregon, and to have a small ownership share of a small Portland marina. An acquaintance in Lake Oswego said Brenneke had claimed to have been a pilot for the CIA-affiliated airline Air America.

According to journalist Frank Snepp, "throughout the mid '80s Brenneke courted a bunch of would-be weapons dealers" and "began traveling to Europe as an apprentice arms broker for the Farnham-Ottokar Trust" in late 1984. On one of these trips during the early summer of 1985, he met American arms merchant John Delarocque in France and became aware of Ari Ben-Menashe. In July, shortly after that trip, Brenneke wrote to propose a weapons deal to Nicholas Davies who had been accused by Seymour Hersh of being an Israeli intelligence agent and partner to Ben-Menashe in a London-based arms company. In September, according to Brenneke's diaries, he again met Delaroque in Saint-Tropez to discuss a private arms deal with Iran known as "Demavand". (Note: Also known as the "Demavand Project" or "Project Condor-Demavend.") Brenneke and Delaroque would later state that deal fell through in October 1985 due to Iran's reluctance to work with the CIA.

Between November 30, 1985, and February 25, 1986, Brenneke sent memos to various officials within the United States Department of Defense claiming that the Iranian government was willing to make a deal with the United States government to exchange their influence over terrorists and hostage-holders for United States weaponry. Brenneke also handed an envelope containing a similar message to an aide of Vice President of the United States George H. W. Bush during Bush's January 1986 visit to Portland. On February 6, United States Air Force Lt. Col. Douglas Menarchik, a military adviser and aide to Vice President George Bush, provided the only official reply to the memos stating: "The U.S. government will not permit or participate in the provision of war materiel to Iran and will prosecute any such efforts by U.S. citizens to the fullest extent of the law."

In April 1986, associates of Brenneke were arrested in the "Brokers of Death" arms case.

In February 1987, The New York Times reported that over an eight-week period it had obtained information about the Demavand project "from more than 4,000 pages of confidential telexes, contracts, correspondence and other documents and interviews with 150 Government officials, arms dealers, intelligence sources and others". Brenneke told the newspaper that private arms dealers made efforts to sell US weapons to Iran in 1983, and Pentagon officials who learned of it allowed it to continue. Brenneke presented a letter stating that he had been employed by the CIA for 13 years, but the CIA said they had no record of his employment.

On November 26, Brenneke's memos were released to defense attorneys in the ongoing "Brokers of Death" arms case in which various defendants, arrested by the United States Customs Service and charged by the United States Attorney's office, said that high ranking US officials - including Bush - needed their services to sell weapons to Iran. Afterwards, he told reporters that in January he followed up on the memos he sent by speaking with Menarchik several times to discuss details of the plan to sell US weapons to Iran. Brenneke said US intelligence sources told him that the United States Department of Defense was planning to purchase weapons for Nicaraguan rebels with the profits of weapons sales to Iran, and after informing Menarchik was told, "We will look into it." He claimed that Menarchik told him that his letter of February 6 was a public statement intended to protect a covert operation. Through a spokesman, Mernarchik denied having the conversations with Brenneke. Bush spokesman Marlin Fitzwater said the idea that Bush would have approved the deal was "pure nonsense" and that it was a "standard trick" for arms dealers to claim that they had well-placed contacts within the government.

Brenneke also added to his earlier claims stating that what he relayed to Menarchik included information that he had learned from US intelligence sources that profits from the sale of weapons to Iran would be used to purchase arms for the Contras.

Brenneke's documents included a December 1985 report to him from Delaroque claiming that John Poindexter had verbally approved the sale of TOW anti-tank missiles to Iran through a private Israeli company.

In December 1986 Brenneke was listed by the Philadelphia Inquirer as one of 16 of a "cast of characters" involved in the Iran-Contra affair, describing him as "An Oregon real estate developer with extensive contacts in Iran. Says he was involved, with the CIA and NSA, in an attempt to sell 39 F-4E fighter planes to Iran in 1985. Says he met with several Iranian officials."

On April 23, 1987, Brenneke told the Detroit Free Press that Iranian authorities gave him intelligence information to pass along to the United States government as an inducement to allow him and his associates to sell them weapons in late 1984. He said that he and two French colleagues gave material to French, Israeli, and United States intelligence sources that included information about the PLO headquarters in Tunisia, prior to its bombing by Israel on October 1, 1985, and maps of Libyan leader Muammar Gaddafi's headquarters, prior to the United States bombing of Libya on April 15, 1986. Brenneke said the intelligence offerings were given to him by an Iranian air force officer authorized by Hashemi Rafsanjani, the speaker of Iran's parliament, with whom he occasionally spoke with by telephone, and other Iranian officials. He said that he then passed the information to Lt. Col. Larry Caylor, with United States Army Intelligence and Security Command, and Lt. Col. George Alvarez, a Marine Corps counterintelligence, who forwarded some of it to Menarchik.

"Called before a Senate subcommittee on narcotics and international relations in 1988, Brenneke claimed to have run drugs from Colombia to the U.S. as part of a Contra supply operation. He also testified to having purchased arms in Czechoslovakia for the Nicaraguan rebels. That testimony was called slanderous by then-Vice President Bush, and a 1989 Senate committee report concluded that Brenneke never had the Central Intelligence Agency connections he claimed."

Dubious statements from Brenneke contributed to the Mena scandal, one facet of the conspiracy theory that the CIA aided in the smuggling of drugs to raise profits for the Contras.

=== Rupp trial (1988) ===
On September 23, 1988, Brenneke voluntarily testified at the sentencing hearing of Heinrich Rupp, a "close friend" who had been convicted of bank fraud. Brenneke testified that Rupp believed he was acting on behalf of the CIA in carrying out the fraud, which Brenneke said was part of a much wider CIA scheme to gain funding for covert operations by defrauding savings and loan associations. Brenneke cited Indian Springs State Bank as an example – the bank had loaned money to Global International Airways, a company involved in the Iran-Contra affair, and the Iranian Farhad Azima had been a major shareholder of the bank and also owner of the airline. A 1975 ID card Brenneke supplied to a Houston Post reporter showed Rupp as a pilot for the airline.

Brenneke said that he and Rupp had been involved in various covert operations for the agency in the past. He said he and Rupp and been involved in such matters since Brenneke's days at the CIA's Air America, beginning in 1967. As an example of the kind of covert operations he and Rupp had been involved in, Brenneke said that he and Rupp had been involved in some of the meetings at which the 1980 October Surprise affair was arranged. Brenneke said that on the night of October 18, 1980, Rupp had flown William Casey from Washington's National Airport to Paris' Le Bourget Airfield for a series of secret meetings. These meetings (on October 19 and 20) involved negotiations between Iranian representatives and members of the Reagan-Bush campaign. Brenneke testified he was present at the last of three meetings, on the details of the cash and weapons involved, at which Casey and Donald Gregg were also present. Brenneke also testified that George H. W. Bush was present in Paris for the meetings, but a month after his deposition he amended his statement by letter to the judge, clarifying that his knowledge of Bush's presence was not first-hand but came from Rupp.

=== Perjury trial (1989–1990) ===
For his role in the Rupp trial, Brenneke was charged with five counts of making false declarations to a federal judge, a charge slightly stronger than perjury. He was indicted on May 12, 1989, accused of lying about his and Rupp's CIA connections and about the October Surprise meetings. The timing caused some speculation that the charges were intended to avoid political embarrassment for Donald Gregg, whose Senate confirmation hearings for his appointment as Ambassador to South Korea began the same day: the charges prevented senators from raising accusations Brenneke had made in 1988 that Gregg had directed the Iran-Contra affair out of the Vice-president's office. The prosecution offered Brenneke a deal that would keep him out of prison if he pleaded guilty; he refused.

The prosecution produced a CIA personnel specialist who testified that he could not find Brenneke or Rupp in the Agency's employment records, but under cross-examination admitted that Rupp had been trained by the CIA's Intermountain Aviation, and that the Agency had "files" on both Rupp and Brenneke. Frank Snepp testified that CIA contract agents were often not listed in employment records where the agents were involved in sensitive operations. Two intelligence operatives from Texas testified to collaborating with Brenneke. Donald Gregg testified that on October 18, 1980, he was not in Paris but on holiday in Delaware, providing in evidence family photographs he said were taken that weekend. A meteorologist testified that the sunny weather conditions made it highly unlikely that they had been taken that weekend in that location. The prosecution failed to prove that Casey and Bush could not have attended the Paris meetings. Defense witnesses included William Northrop indicted in the Brokers of Death arms case, which had been dropped in January 1989 on the grounds that the prosecution could not disprove the defendants' claims that they believed the planned arms shipments to Iran were or could be government-sanctioned. Northrop testified that Israeli arms shipments to Iran began "within a fortnight" of the Paris meeting.

On May 4, 1990, after only five hours of deliberation, the jury found Brenneke "not guilty" on all five counts. Following the trial, jury foreman Mark Kristoff stated, "We were convinced that, yes, there was a meeting, and he was there and the other people listed in the indictment were there.... There never was a guilty vote.... It was 100 percent."

=== Claims on RAI Television ===
In July 1990, Brenneke provided documents to Italian journalists regarding Licio Gelli and Propaganda Due (P2), asserting CIA support for their activities. Calling the allegations "absolute nonsense", the CIA denied involvement in Italian terrorism and the assassination of Olof Palme. Given "the outrageous nature of his claims", the CIA gave a public denial stating: "The agency flatly denies that Mr. Brenneke was ever an agent of the CIA or had any association with the CIA."

=== Brenneke's records ===
In 1991, Peggy Adler was retained by Brenneke to co-author his autobiography. Discovering evidence in his files contradicting some of his claims regarding his presence at October Surprise conspiracy meetings, she contacted former CIA agent-turned-journalist, Frank Snepp. Snepp included this evidence (of credit card receipts showing a presence in Portland when Brenneke said he was in Paris) in a February 1992 article he wrote for the Village Voice. Adler's work was the subject of a chapter in Robert Parry's book, "Trick or Treason: The October Surprise Mystery" and she was interviewed by PBS' Frontline in this regard, aired in April 1992. In mid-1992, learning that the House October Surprise Task Force was investigating whether or not there actually had been an October Surprise, she contacted investigative journalist and author Steven Emerson, who put her in touch with the Task Force so that she could turn over to them the seventy cartons of documents she had hauled east from Brenneke's home in Portland, Oregon, in order to write his memoirs. In the month of June Adler worked as a consultant to the Task Force.

== Death ==
In 2015, Brenneke died from complications due to heart disease and diabetes.
