= Partnership for a Secure America =

American think tank

- Abbreviation: PSA
- Formation: 2005; 21 years ago
- Founder: Lee H. Hamilton Warren Rudman
- Type: Nonprofit organization
- Headquarters: 1990 M. Street NW, Suite 250
- Location: Washington, D.C.
- Website: psaonline.org

Partnership for a Secure America (PSA) is a nonprofit organization in Washington, D.C. that seeks to promote bipartisan solutions to today's critical national security and foreign policy issues. Created by former Congressman Lee H. Hamilton and former Senator Warren Rudman (R-NH) in 2005, the Partnership for a Secure America works with leading Democrats and Republicans to rebuild the bipartisan center in American national security and foreign policy.

== Advisory board ==
Current members of Partnership for a Secure America's bipartisan advisory board include:

- Evan Bayh, Governor (D-IN) 1989–1997, US Senator (D-IN) 1999–2011
- Bob Corker, US Senator (R-TN) 2007–2018
- William Cohen, Secretary of Defense 1997–2001
- Tom Daschle, US Congressman (D-SD) 1979–1987, US Senator (D-SD) 1987–2005
- Paula Dobriansky, Under Secretary of State 2001–2009
- Lee Hamilton, US Congressman (D-IN) 1981–1987, 1989–2001, Vice-chair of the 9/11 Commission
- Gary Hart, US Senator (D-CO) 1975–1987
- Carla Hills, US Trade Representative 1989–1993
- Charles W. Hooper, U.S. Army General (Ret.), Director of the Defense Security Cooperation Agency 2017–2020
- Jeh Johnson, Secretary of Homeland Security 2013–2017
- Nancy Kassebaum-Baker, US Senator (R-KS) 1978–1997
- Thomas Kean, Governor (R-NJ) 1982–1990, Chairman of the 9/11 Commission
- John Lehman, Secretary of the Navy 1981–1987
- Donald McHenry, Ambassador to the United Nations 1979–1981
- Michael Mullen, U.S. Navy Admiral (Ret.), Chairman of the Joint Chiefs of Staff 2007–2011
- Sam Nunn, US Senator 1972–1996
- Leon Panetta, Secretary of Defense 2011–2013
- Thomas Pickering, Under Secretary of State 1997–2000
- David Petraeus, U.S. Army General (Ret.), Director of the Central Intelligence Agency 2011–2012
- Olympia Snowe, US Congressman (R-ME) 1979–1995, US Senator (R-ME) 1995–2013
- Frank Wisner, Homeland Security Advisor 2004–2008
- William Perry, Secretary of Defense 1994–1997
- Frances Townsend, Homeland Security Advisor 2004–2008
- Robert Zoellick, U.S. Trade Representative 2001–2005, Deputy Secretary of State 2005–2006, President of the World Bank Group 2007–2012

== Programs ==
Partnership for a Secure America is most well known on Capitol Hill for its bipartisan, bicameral Congressional Partnership Program (CPP), which it has run since 2009. Participants in this program get a special look at foreign policy and national security issues through a number of policy seminars with current and former administration officials. Previous speakers have included members of PSA's bipartisan advisory board, Tara Sonenshine, Ben Rhodes and others. Participants in the Congressional Partnership Program have also visited a number of organizations that influence international affairs.

PSA also works with the Harvard Law School Program on Negotiation to equip congressional staff with a foundation of knowledge on negotiation and consensus-building strategies that will help participants develop bipartisan solutions to seemingly intractable issues. The program focuses on countering the win-lose style of negotiations, and instead focuses on win-win negotiation tactics. The PSA-Harvard Negotiation Program has been running since 2014.

Since 2012, Partnership for a Secure America has worked with the US Institute of Peace "to provide opportunities for congressional staff to engage with leading experts and fellow Capitol Hill staffers in bipartisan forums." PSA has put on over 90 briefings with the US Institute of Peace, on topics ranging from Tunisian security issues and Afghanistan elections to revolutions in Egypt and Ukraine.

== Publications ==
PSA's bipartisan policy statements are signed by influential policy leaders and are pivotal in advancing bipartisan consensus and have garnered coverage by leading newspapers around the world. These statements help create bipartisan consensus among Democrats and Republicans on issues ranging from non-proliferation to climate change.

=== Arms Control and Nonproliferation ===
In September 2008, PSA issued a report card on the government's progress on preventing catastrophic nuclear, biological, or chemical attacks on the US. The organization gave the government an overall grade of C.

| Subject | Issue Area | Grade |
|---|---|---|
| Nuclear Terrorism | Preventing Nuclear Terrorism | C |
| | Cooperative nonproliferation and counter proliferation | C+ |
| | Detecting and inter detecting weapons and materials | B |
| | Integrating US Programs | D |
| | Sustaining Programs | D |
| Chemical Terrorism | Preventing Chemical Terrorism | B- |
| | Recognizing and preventing Chemical Terrorism Threat | C- |
| | Detection and mitigation | B |
| | Protecting Critical Infrastructure | C+ |
| | Demilitarizing chemical weapons | B |
| Biological Terrorism | Preventing biological terrorism | C- |
| | Denying access to bioterrorism agents | B |
| | Detecting covert bioterrorism preparations | C- |
| | Law enforcement interdiction | B- |
| | Establishing international cooperation | D+ |
| | New vaccines and drugs | C- |
| | Global public health preparedness and response | B |

=== Climate ===
In March 2013, PSA released a statement highlighting the "staggering" cost of inaction, signed by 38 lawmakers, Cabinet secretaries, military and intelligence officials and national security experts. In the following weeks, the organization brought George P. Shultz, Ronald Reagan's Secretary of State, to Capitol Hill to hold a briefing on climate change and how it affects American national security and its role in the world. In total, PSA has released three bipartisan policy statements highlighting the importance of preventing climate change. One draws attention to the fact that the while the military and intelligence forces can monitor and protect us from terrorism, cannot protect us from rising seas, more violent storms, record droughts, spreading diseases and other long-term consequences of carbon pollution. The most recent policy statement was signed by 48 Republican and Democrat senior politicians, military commanders, security advisers and diplomats—including Chuck Hagel, William Cohen and Madeleine Albright—and states that climate change is a threat multiplier, as stated by the Department of Defense.
