= Jean-Charles Marchiani =

French prefect and politician (born 1943)

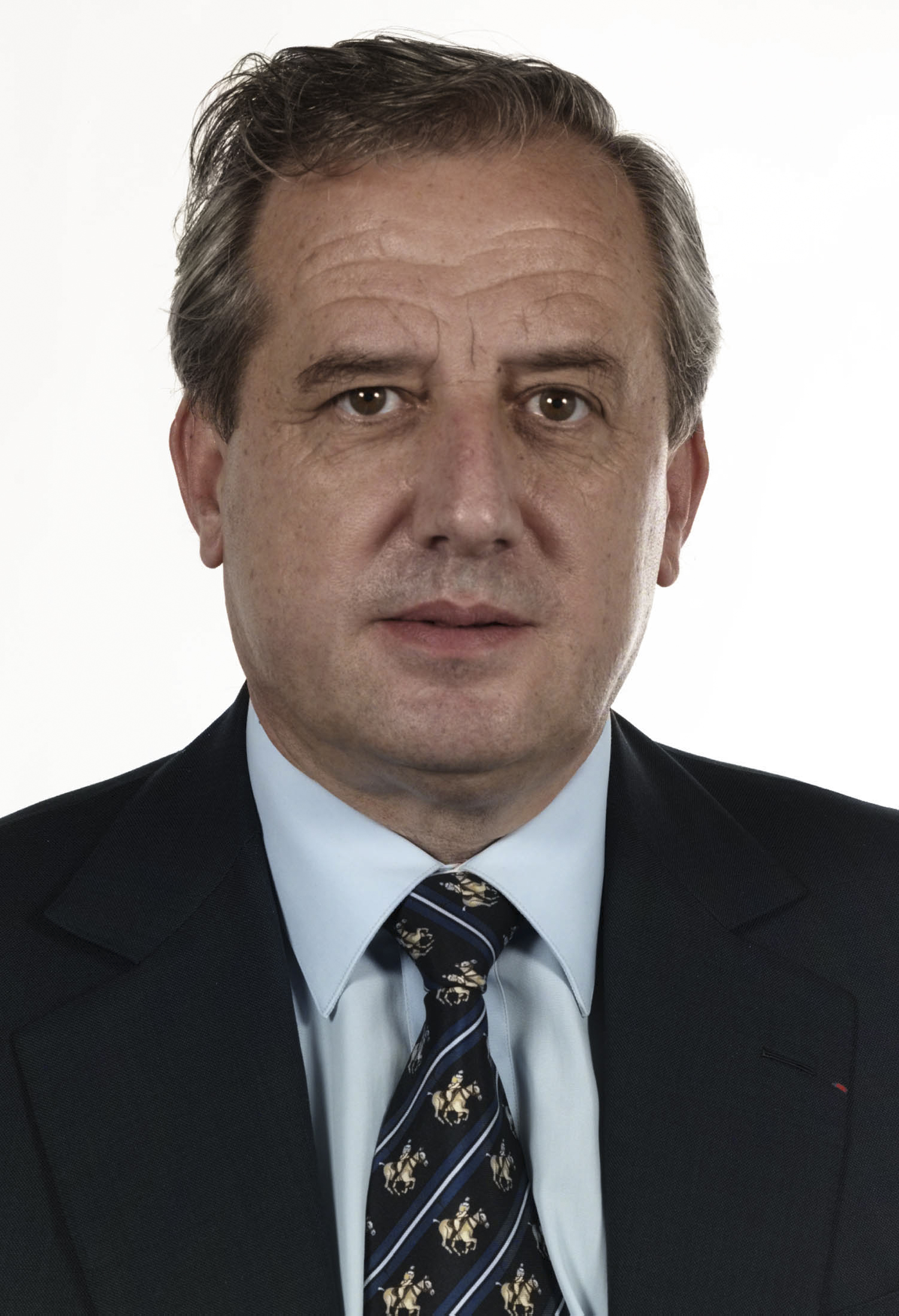
- Official portrait, 1999

Member of the European Parliament for France
- In office 1999–2004

Personal details
- Born: 6 August 1943 (age 81)
- Political party: Rally for France

Military service
- Allegiance: France
- Branch/service: Service de documentation extérieure et de contre-espionnage; Directorate-General for External Security
- Battles/wars: Lebanese Civil War; Bosnian War

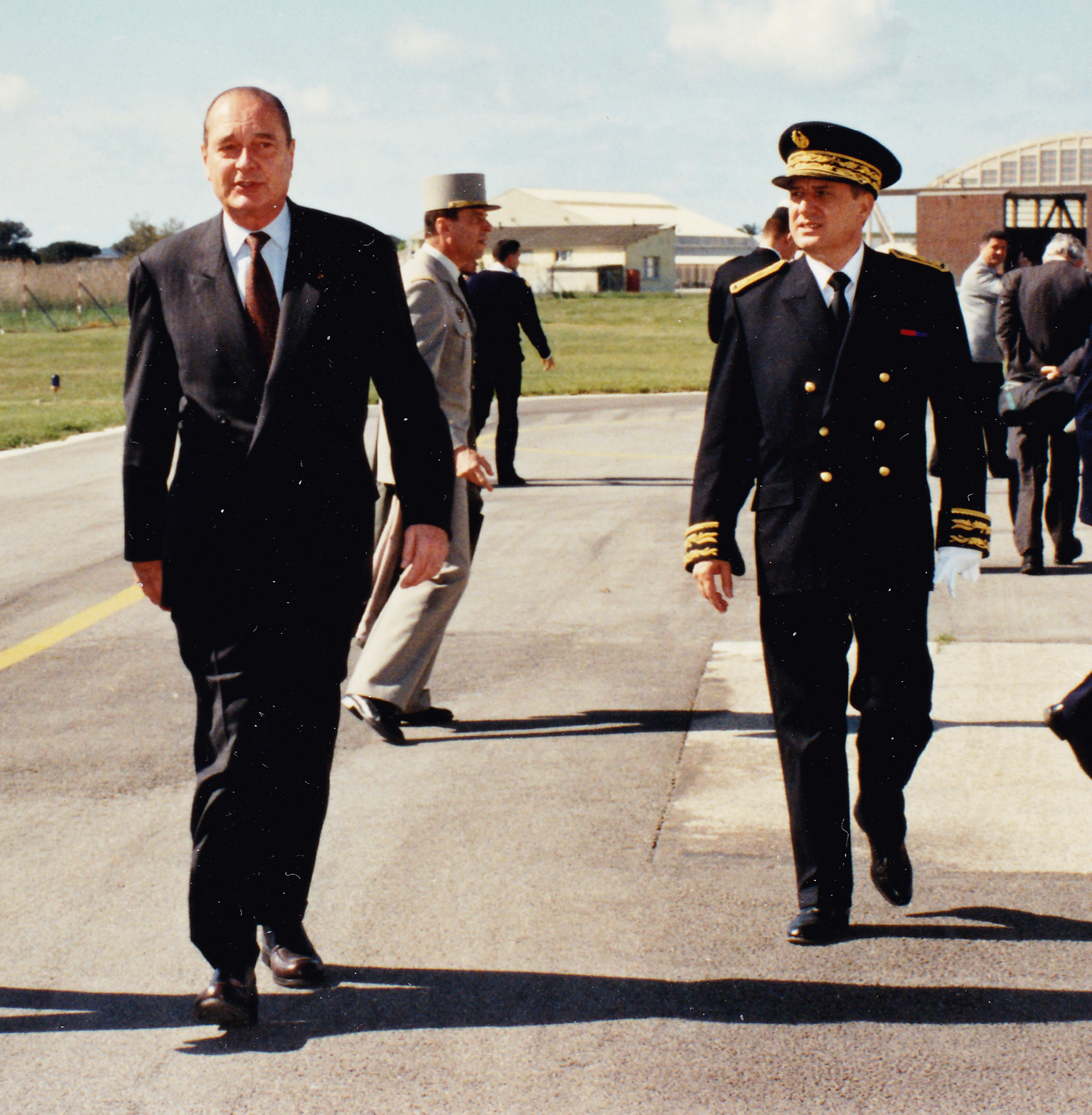
President Jacques Chirac (left) and Jean-Charles Marchiani (right).

Jean-Charles Marchiani (born 6 August 1943) is a French prefect, former intelligence officer and politician who served as a Member of the European Parliament for France from 1999 to 2004, representing the Rally for France party. Prior to his political career, Marchiani was a hostage negotiator responsible for overseeing the release of French hostages in Lebanon and Bosnia.

== Intelligence and counter-terrorism ==
Jean-Charles Marchiani was only 19 when he was recruited by the SDECE, while completing Law school in Aix-en-Provence (south-east of France), during the Algerian war. From 1962 to 1970, he served as a SDECE officer. In 1970, he started a career in the private sector. From 1986 to 1988 and from 1993 to 1995, Marchiani was appointed as a special advisor for Homeland Security Minister Charles Pasqua. He was notably in charge of intelligence and counter-terrorism during the 1995 Algerian GIA terrorist attacks in Paris.

== Negotiations and hostages crisis ==
=== Lebanon hostages crisis ===
Jean-Charles Marchiani became a national hero in France in 1988, when he managed to free three French civilians, held hostages for three years in Beirut by Hezbollah militias. Despite official intelligence agencies' efforts, diplomats Marcel Carton and Marcel Fonataine, as well as journalist Jean-Paul Kauffmann were kept prisoners for more than three years. Jean-Charles Marchiani held double negotiations with Hezbollah dignitaries in Lebanon as well as with Iranian and Syrian officials. Amongst them, former Iranian-Jewish SAVAK / DGSE agent Manucher Ghorbanifar had been stated to have also accompanied Marchiani during his meetings. He was therefore able to free the three French nationals on May 5, 1988.

=== Liberation of Air Force pilots in Bosnia ===
Jean-Charles Marchiani was asked in September 1995 by French president Jacques Chirac to start unofficial negotiations with Bosnian nationalists for the liberation of two French Air Force pilots whose jet had been shot down during the NATO bombings in former Yugoslavia. Jean-Charles Marchiani used his connections with former KGB officers to contact Serbian president Radovan Karadžić and threatened him to have French forces leaving Sarajevo, where they were protecting Serbian minority. On December 12, 1995, the two pilots were freed and sent back to France.

== Political career ==
A few weeks after the liberation of French pilots in 1996, Jean-Charles Marchiani was appointed by Jacques Chirac to prefect of the Var region (South East).

Along with Charles Pasqua and Philippe de Villiers, Jean-Charles Marchiani was one of the founding members of the Rally for France (French: Rassemblement pour la France; abbreviated RPF), a right-wing party created in 1999. The RPF got 13% of the vote during 1999 European Parliament election, and Marchiani was elected as a Member of the European Parliament.

Marchiani has been involved in a serie of politico-judicial cases since the early 2000s, involving former French president Jacques Chirac. These cases are connected with Marchiani's shadow's operations and most of them are under the Secret Defense, which Jean-Charles Marchiani has asked to be lifted for a fair trial. Marchiani was sentenced in 2007 to three years in jail, but was later amnestied by French president Nicolas Sarkozy. In the meantime, French Defence minister Hervé Morin wrote to the judge in charge of the case to ask him to drop the charges against Jean-Charles Marchiani.
