= Joseph F. King =

American customs agent

Joseph F. King (born c. 1948) is a former senior US Customs agent and criminal justice academic. He served for 33 years as a Special Agent in the United States Customs Service's New York office. He is an associate professor at the John Jay College of Criminal Justice (since September 2003).

== Background and education ==
King graduated in history from St. Francis College, Brooklyn, in 1968, and gained an MA from the John Jay College of Criminal Justice in 1975. He later gained an MPhil and PhD from the City University of New York CUNY Graduate Center (1990 and 1999).

== Career ==
King was a Special Agent in the United States Customs Service's New York office from 1968 to 1985, acting as a lead agent for undercover operations regarding Middle Eastern and Irish groups. From 1985 to 2003 he was Supervisory Special Agent in the Strategic Investigations Division in the United States Customs Service's New York office. In this capacity, and due to his specialist knowledge, he was a member of the White House Legal Task Force on the Iran-Contra affair, and in 1992 briefly assigned to the House October Surprise Task Force.

King's undercover work included a role in a 1980 case involving arms smuggling to South Africa, a role in the 1984 case against Cyrus Hashemi and his brothers, and playing what he described as a "corrupt former C.I.A.-type" in a 1986 arms deal which became known as the Brokers of Death arms case. Later he played an Irish arms dealer named Joe Kennedy, foiling a 1993 plot to smuggle zirconium to Iraq.
