= Brokers of Death arms case =

20th century American criminal case

The 'Brokers of Death' arms case (officially United States v. Samuel Evans et al) was a US criminal case in the 1980s relating to the attempted shipment of $2.5bn worth of US-made arms to Iran. The Los Angeles Times in 1986 described the case as "the largest arms conspiracy prosecution ever brought by the Justice Department". The case (with indictments in May 1986, following a four-month investigation) was dropped in January 1989 after the prosecution said it could not prove the defendants did not believe their dealings were officially sanctioned. The planned deals were being arranged at the same time as the White House was secretly seeking to arrange arms sales to Iran, in what became known as the Iran-Contra affair; some evidence indicated that defendants were aware of these efforts.

== Overview ==
The Brokers of Death arms case began in December 1985 after Iranian banker Cyrus Hashemi approached US Customs with a deal. Hashemi, described by Assistant Treasury Secretary John M. Walker, Jr. as a "major figure in international arms trafficking", had been indicted in July 1984 over arms dealing with Iran and sought leniency in exchange for cooperation. The US agreed to drop the charges against Hashemi in exchange for his cooperation. He stated that he had been approached in late 1985 by Samuel Evans, an advisor to Saudi arms dealer Adnan Khashoggi, about a potential arms deal, prompting US Customs to establish a sting operation.

The operation involved meetings arranged by Hashemi in hotel suites in New York and Paris, which were recorded using hidden cameras and microphones; the agency also arranged for a vice president of Chemical Bank in New York to confirm by telephone that a one billion dollar line of credit existed in Hashemi’s name. The four-month investigation, costing over $100,000, resulted in arrests in April 1986 in New York and Bermuda, with the involvement of Special Agent Joseph F. King. During the recorded meetings, Evans was documented stating that he had received assurances of "full and complete cooperation" from Israeli officials, and that he expected to discuss the matter with Israeli Defense Minister Yitzhak Rabin on his next trip.

== Indictment ==
In April 1986, 17 suspects were indicted in the case, accused of planning to use false end-user certificates to bypass the US arms embargo against Iran. Three suspects were named as retired Israeli general Avraham Bar-Am, William Northrop, and Samuel Evans. The deal was said to involve over 100 aircraft, as well as tanks and missiles. Tanks were promised by Bar-Am, who said they were Soviet tanks captured from the Syrian Army in 1973. Indictments were issued on 5 May 1986. According to Victor Ostrovsky's The Other Side of Deception, a contact at Mossad asked Ostrovsky to call Bar-Am on 8 April 1986 and tell him that the deal had been approved. Ostrovsky said he made the call, knowing that Bar-Am was walking into a trap – his contact had told him that Bar-Am's contact had been "turned" by the FBI.

A central issue in the case was whether the defendants believed the proposed arms sales had the approval of senior U.S. officials. Evans' lawyer told the court that Evans had first been introduced to Cyrus Hashemi by Roy Furmark, a close friend of Central Intelligence Agency Director William Casey, in January 1985. Furmark was alleged to have repeatedly assured Evans that according to Casey the US approved of supplying arms to Iran. Northrop sought Casey's telephone logs, claiming to have spoken with him on a monthly basis since 1981 and that Casey knew of and approved of the deals. Testifying to Congress, Casey stated Furmark told him in October 1986 about the possible diversion of funds from arms sales to Iran.

Other evidence cited by the defense involved contacts with diplomatic and political figures. One of the defendants met with US Ambassador Maxwell M. Rabb in Rome, and was recorded telling Hashemi that he was waiting for Rabb to confirm official approval; Rabb later admitted the meeting but denied discussing the arms deal. In recorded conversations, an arms dealer with a diplomatic passport, John Delaroque, told Hashemi in February 1986 that the matter had "gone as far as Vice President George H. W. Bush". The same recordings included claims that Delaroque was meeting with Bush and that the Vice President supported proceeding with the transaction, while Secretary of State George P. Shultz was opposed.

== Review after Iran–Contra ==
In November 1986 Iran-Contra affair revelations forced the Justice Department to launch a review of the case. After a Supreme Court decision in an unrelated case narrowed mail and wire fraud prosecutions, 46 of the 55 charges were dropped in mid-1988. The case against the 12 defendants was finally dropped in January 1989, with prosecutor Rudy Giuliani conceding that the prosecution was unable to prove that the defendants did not believe the planned deals "were officially sanctioned or that approval of the United States for such sales could be obtained". The planned deals were being arranged at the same time as the White House was secretly seeking to arrange arms sales to Iran (including suspending enforcement of the Arms Export Control Act in January 1986), in what became known as the Iran-Contra affair; some evidence indicated that defendants were aware of these efforts. Some defendants were close associates of Adnan Khashoggi, who became a middle-man in arms sales to Iran which were officially approved and carried out.

== Books ==
- Hermann Moll and Michael Leapman (1988), Broker of Death: An Insider's Story of the Iran Arms Deals Macmillan, ISBN 978-0333459423
