= Lee Hamilton =

American politician and lawyer (1931–2026)

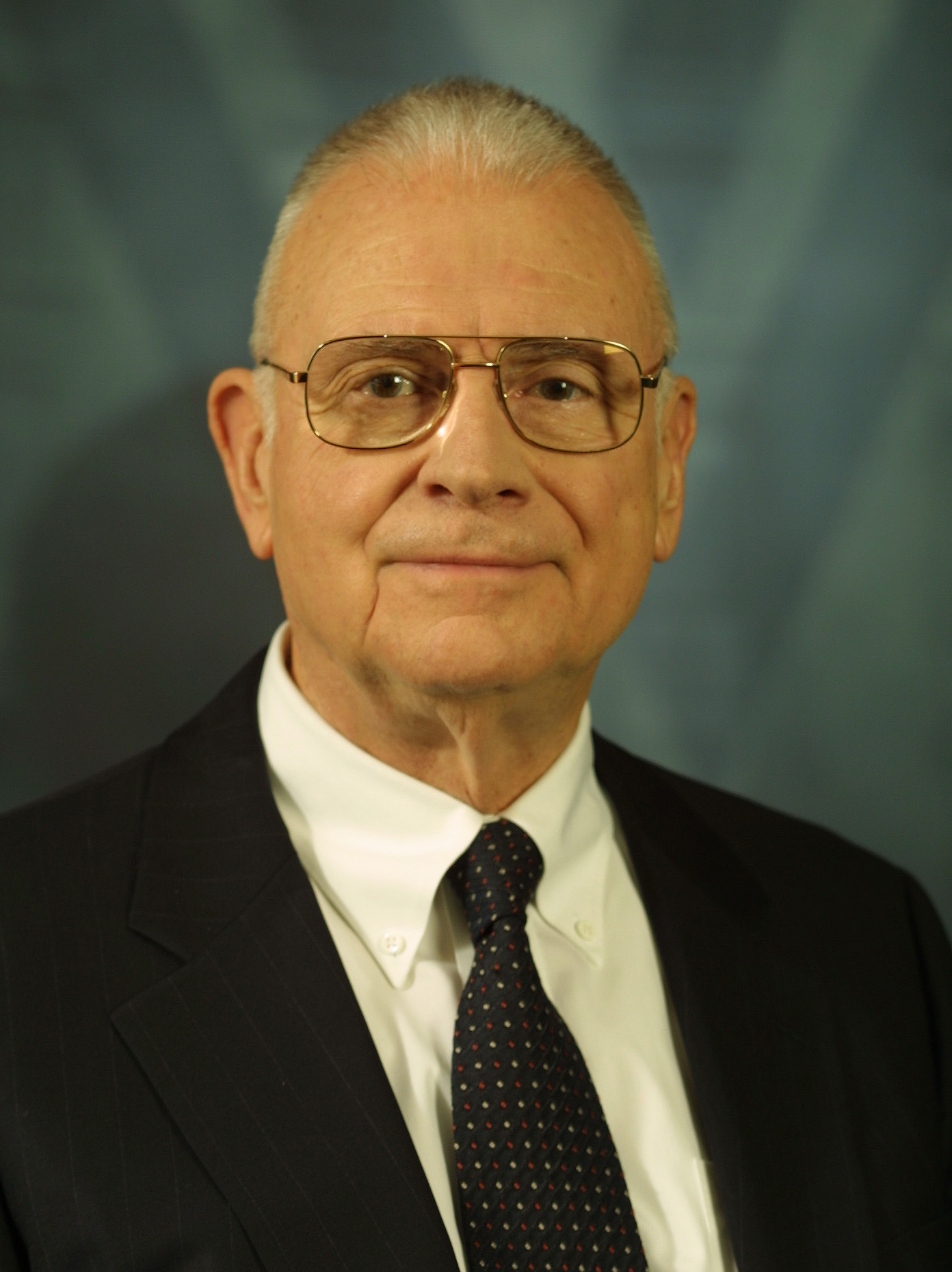
- Official portrait for the 9/11 Commission

Vice Chair of the 9/11 Commission
- In office December 11, 2002 – August 21, 2004
- President: George W. Bush
- Preceded by: George J. Mitchell
- Succeeded by: Position abolished

Chair of the House Foreign Affairs Committee
- In office January 3, 1993 – January 3, 1995
- Preceded by: Dante Fascell
- Succeeded by: Benjamin Gilman

Chair of the House Intelligence Committee
- In office January 3, 1985 – January 3, 1987
- Preceded by: Edward Boland
- Succeeded by: Louis Stokes

Member of the U.S. House of Representatives from Indiana's 9th district
- In office January 3, 1965 – January 3, 1999
- Preceded by: Earl Wilson
- Succeeded by: Baron Hill

Personal details
- Born: Lee Herbert Hamilton; April 20, 1931 Daytona Beach, Florida, U.S.
- Died: February 3, 2026 (aged 94) Bloomington, Indiana, U.S.
- Party: Democratic
- Spouse: Nancy Nelson (m. 1954; died 2012)
- Children: 3
- Education: DePauw University (BA); Indiana University, Bloomington (JD)
- Awards: Presidential Medal of Freedom
- Hamilton's voice Hamilton outlining the Iraq Claims Act of 1994. Recorded April 28, 1994

Lee Herbert Hamilton (April 20, 1931 – February 3, 2026) was an American politician and lawyer from Indiana. He was a member of the United States House of Representatives and a member of the U.S. Homeland Security Advisory Council. A member of the Democratic Party, Hamilton represented the 9th congressional district of Indiana from 1965 to 1999. Following his departure from Congress, he served on a number of governmental advisory boards, most notably as the vice chairman of the 9/11 Commission.

== Early life and education ==
Hamilton was born in Daytona Beach, Florida, on April 20, 1931, and raised in Evansville, Indiana. He attended public schools and graduated from Evansville Central High School in 1948. An outstanding basketball player, he led the Central Bears to the state title game in March 1948; he then continued his playing career at DePauw University, where he played for Coach Jay McCreary. Hamilton graduated from DePauw in 1952, and from the Indiana University School of Law in 1956. He worked as a lawyer in private practice for the next ten years in Columbus, Indiana.

== Congress ==
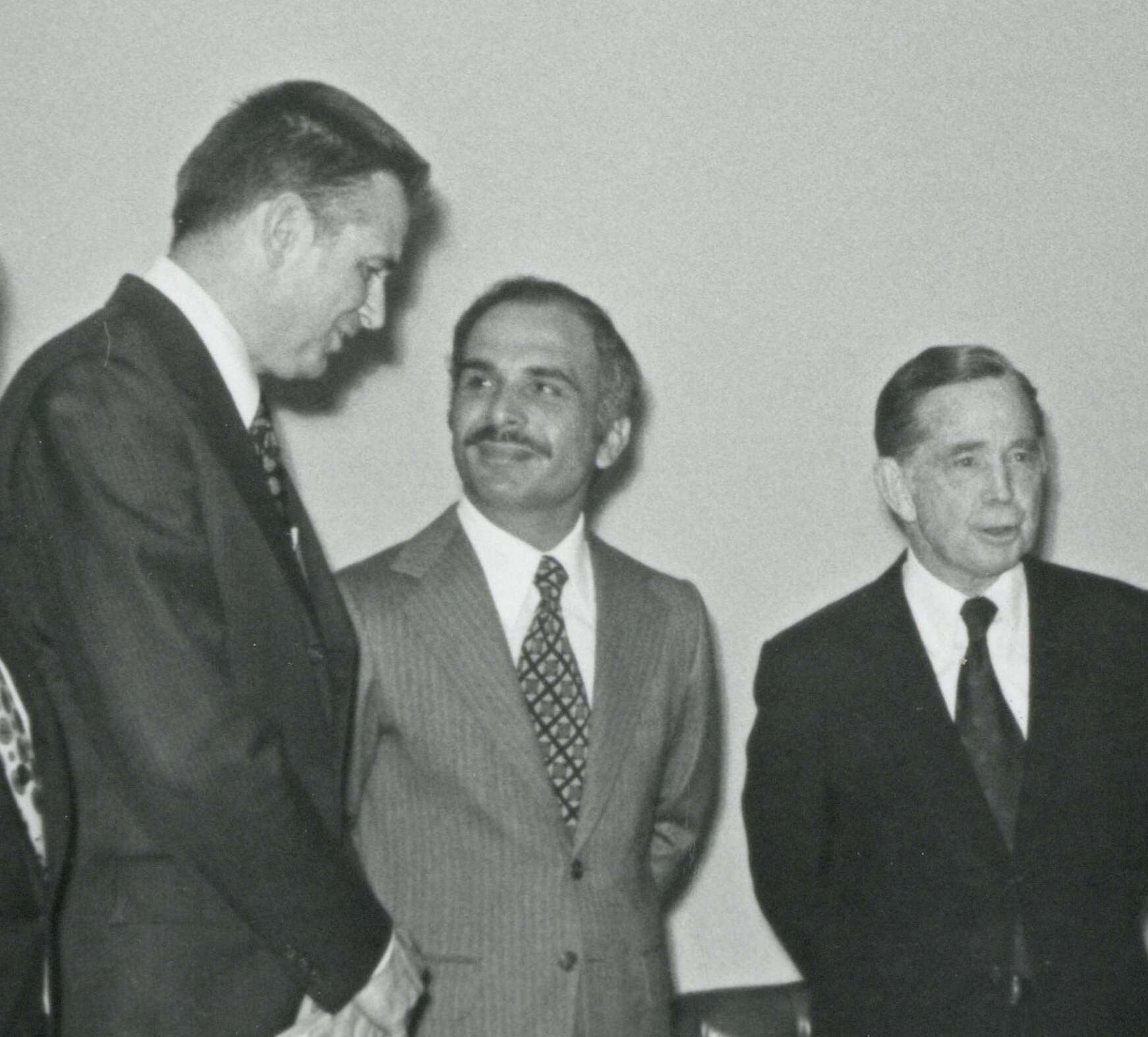
U.S. Representative Hamilton with Hussein of Jordan (center) and Speaker Carl Albert, March 1979

Hamilton was elected to the U.S. House of Representatives as a Democrat as part of the national Democratic landslide of 1964. He chaired many committees during his tenure in office, including the House Committee on Foreign Affairs, the U.S. House Permanent Select Committee on Intelligence, the Joint Committee on Printing, and others.

As chairman of the House Select Committee to Investigate Covert Arms Transactions with Iran (1987), Hamilton chose not to investigate President Ronald Reagan or President George H. W. Bush, stating that he did not think it would be "good for the country" to put the public through another impeachment trial. Hamilton was later chair of the House October Surprise Task Force (1992).

He remained in Congress until 1999. He was viewed as a potential Democratic vice-presidential running mate in 1988 and 1992.

== Life after Congress ==
In November 2002, President George W. Bush nominated Hamilton as the vice-chairman of the 9/11 Commission, officially titled The National Commission on Terrorist Attacks on the United States. On March 15, 2006, Congress announced the formation of the Iraq Study Group, organized by the United States Institute of Peace, of which Hamilton was the Democratic co-chairman, along with the former Secretary of State (under President George H. W. Bush) James A. Baker III.

After leaving Congress, Hamilton served as a member of the Hart-Rudman Commission, and was co-chairman of the Commission to Investigate Certain Security Issues at Los Alamos. He sat on many advisory boards, including those of the CIA, the President's Homeland Security Advisory Council, and the U.S. Army. Hamilton was an advisory board member and co-chair for the Partnership for a Secure America, a not-for-profit organization aiming to recreate the bipartisan center in American national security and foreign policy. He was previously the president and director of the Woodrow Wilson International Center for Scholars, and was appointed to serve as the vice chair of the 9/11 Commission. From 2000 to 2001, he served as the American member of the International Commission on Intervention and State Sovereignty, which prepared the U.N. policy of Responsibility to Protect, adopted in 2005. He was also a member of the board of advisors of the Albright Stonebridge Group. He was appointed co-chair of the Blue Ribbon Commission on America's Nuclear Future from 2010 to 2012 alongside Brent Scowcroft. He was also a member of a Washington D.C.–based think tank called the Inter-American Dialogue.

Hamilton served as the co-chair of the National Security Preparedness Group (NSPG) at the Bipartisan Policy Center. Hamilton was the co-chair with Sandra Day O'Connor of the Campaign for the Civic Mission of Schools. He also served as an advisory board member for the Partnership for a Secure America and for America Abroad Media.

In 2004, Hamilton released the book How Congress Works and Why You Should Care, in which he explains the role, workings and the importance of Congress to everyday Americans, drawing on reflections of his time as a member of the House. He also suggests improvements to Congress.

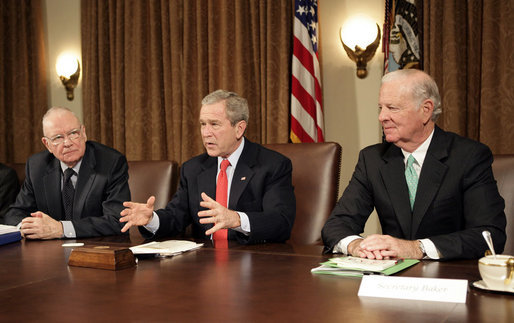
Lee Hamilton (left) and James Baker (right) present the Iraq Study Group Report to President George W. Bush on December 6, 2006.

On February 25, 2011, Hamilton wrote a letter to President Barack Obama urging him to commute Jonathan Pollard's sentence to time served. Pollard was serving a life sentence for providing Israel with classified information, without the intent to harm the United States, a crime that normally carries a sentence of two to four years. In his letter, he stated, "I do believe that he has served a disproportionately severe sentence." He also stated, "I have been acquainted for many years with members of his family, especially his parents, and I know how much pain and anguish they have suffered because of their son's incarceration." He contended that "commuting his sentence is a matter of basic compassion and justice." Pollard was granted parole on July 7, 2015, and released on November 20, 2015.

On August 11, 2012, Hamilton's wife Nancy died in an automobile-related accident; no one else was injured. Prior to her death, she was an artist. In 1981, her oil paintings and watercolors were featured in an exhibit at The Commons and in 1984 she had a one-woman show at a Seymour art gallery. Nancy also contributed thousands of hours at the INOVA Alexandria Virginia Hospital.

He endorsed Barack Obama in the 2008 presidential election.

Hamilton was a member of the ReFormers Caucus of Issue One.

He served as an honorary co-chair for the World Justice Project, an organization that works to strengthen the rule of law worldwide.

== Personal life and death ==
Hamilton married Nancy Nelson in 1954. The couple had three children and were married until her death in 2012. Lee Hamilton died in Bloomington, Indiana, on February 3, 2026, at the age of 94.

== Honors and awards ==
A nine-mile stretch of I-265 and Indiana 265 in Floyd and Clark counties, part of Hamilton's former House district, was designated the "Lee H. Hamilton Highway" shortly after his retirement from the House in 1999. The moniker is largely symbolic, as locals generally do not refer to the road by that name, although the name is used frequently by the traffic reporter for the area's largest radio station, WHAS 840-AM in nearby Louisville, Kentucky.

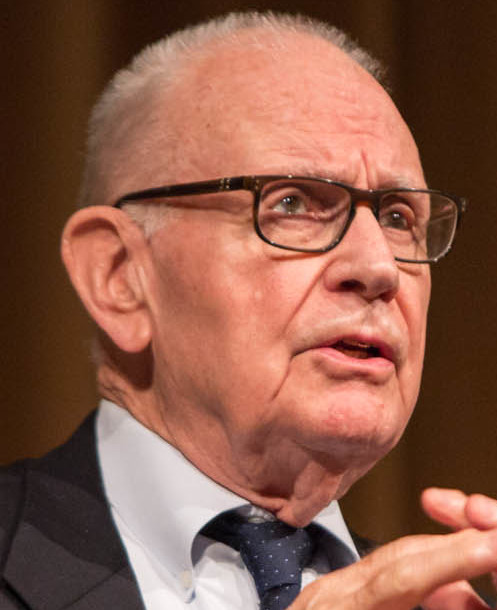
Hamilton in April 2016

In 1982, Hamilton was inducted into the Indiana Basketball Hall of Fame, in honor of his outstanding prep basketball career; he led the Evansville Central Bears to three deep runs in the IHSAA tournament. In 1946, the Bears made the state semi-finals, in 1947, they made the state quarter-finals; as a senior, he led them to the championship game. He was selected All-State his senior season and was awarded the Trester Award for mental attitude. He later starred for the DePauw Tigers, leading them in scoring average in 1951 and rebounds in 1951 and 1952.

In 2001 Lee H. Hamilton was presented the Lifetime Contributions to American Diplomacy Award by the American Foreign Service Association.

In 2005, Hamilton received the U.S. Senator John Heinz Award for Greatest Public Service by an Elected or Appointed Official, an award given out annually by Jefferson Awards.

In 2007, Hamilton was elected as an honorary fellow in the National Academy of Public Administration.

In 2011, Hamilton received the Benjamin Harrison Presidential Site Advancing American Democracy Award.

In November 2015, Hamilton was awarded the Presidential Medal of Freedom by President Barack Obama in a ceremony at the White House.

In 2018, Indiana University Bloomington announced that the School of Global and International Studies would be renamed the Hamilton Lugar School of Global and International Studies in honor of Hamilton and former U.S. senator Richard Lugar, describing both as "two immensely accomplished Indiana statesmen and two of the nation's most distinguished and influential voices in foreign policy."

== Bibliography ==
- A Creative Tension: The Foreign Policy Roles of the President and the Congress, with Jordan Tama, Washington, D.C.: Woodrow Wilson Center Press, 2003.
- How Congress Works and Why You Should Care. Bloomington, IN: Indiana University Press, 2004.
- Without Precedent, the Inside Story of the 9/11 Commission, with T. H. Kean, New York: Vintage Books, Random House, Inc., 2007.
- Strengthening Congress. Bloomington, IN: Indiana University Press, 2009.
- The 9/11 Commission Report: Final Report of the National Commission on Terrorist Attacks Upon the United States. New York: W. W. Norton & Company, 2011.

U.S. House of Representatives
| Preceded by Earl Wilson | Member of the U.S. House of Representatives from Indiana's 9th congressional district 1965–1999 | Succeeded by Baron Hill |
| Preceded by Edward Boland | Chair of the House Intelligence Committee; 1985–1987 | Succeeded by Louis Stokes |
| New office | Chair of the House Iran-Contra Committee; 1987 | Position abolished |
| New office | Chair of the Joint Reorganization Committee; 1992–1994; Served alongside: David Boren | Position abolished |
| Preceded by Dante Fascell | Chair of the House Foreign Affairs Committee; 1993–1995 | Succeeded by Benjamin Gilman |
| Preceded by Benjamin Gilman | Ranking Member of the House Foreign Affairs Committee; 1995–1999 | Succeeded by Sam Gejdenson |
