= Avraham Bar-Am =

Israeli general

- אברהם ברעם
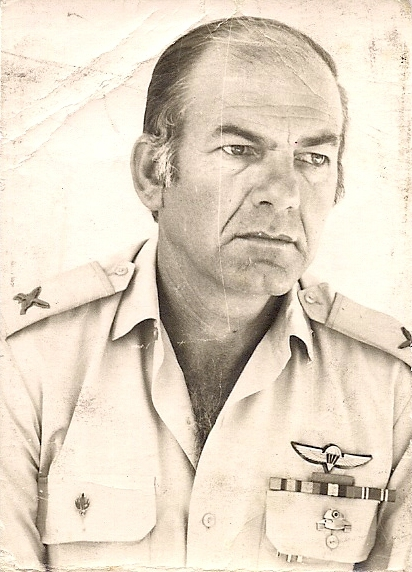
- Born: 1933 (age 92–93)
- Occupation: retired Israeli general
- Known for: Second in command of Israel's Northern Army Command during the 1982 Lebanon War

Avraham Bar-Am (Hebrew: אברהם ברעם; born c. 1933) is a retired Israeli general. Bar-Am was the second in command of Israel's Northern Army Command in the 1982 Lebanon War; he retired in 1984. In 1986 he was one of 17 indicted in the Brokers of Death arms case involving the proposed sale of $2bn of US-made Israeli arms to Iran; the case was dropped in 1989 after prosecutors said it could not prove the defendants did not believe their dealings were officially sanctioned.

== Career ==
Bar-Am was an armored battalion commander in the 1967 Six-Day War, with the rank of colonel. Bar-Am blocked the retreat of Egyptian forces through the Sinai's Mitla Pass, against superior numbers and with little fuel and ammunition. He was promoted to brigadier and commanded an armored division in the 1973 Yom Kippur War. Bar-Am was the second in command of Israel's Northern Army Command in the 1982 Lebanon War; he retired in 1984.
