= Manucher Ghorbanifar =

Iranian arms trader

- Born: 9 May 1945 (age 81); Iran
- Espionage activity
- Service branch: SAVAK
- Service years: Unknown–1979
- Operations: NEQAB; Iran–Contra affair
- Other work: Arms dealer

Manucher Ghorbanifar (Persian: منوچهر قربانی‌فر, nicknamed Gorba; born May 9, 1945) is an expatriate Iranian arms dealer and former SAVAK agent.

According to the Washington Report on Middle East Affairs, Ghorbanifar was a double agent for Iran and Israel. CIA director William Casey believed that Ghorbanifar was an Israeli agent.

He is best known as a middleman in the Iran–Contra Affair during the Ronald Reagan presidency. He re-emerged in American politics during the lead-up to the 2003 invasion of Iraq during the first term of President George W. Bush as a back-channel intelligence source who reported on "interactions and attempts at negotiations" between Iranian officials and US ambassador to Iraq, Zalmay Khalilzad.

== Career ==
Prior to the 1979 Iranian Revolution Ghorbanifar was an agent of Iran's SAVAK intelligence service, and a partner in an Israeli-Iranian shipping company, Starline Iran, which shipped oil from Iran to Israel. Ghorbanifar knew Israel's military attache in Tehran, Yaakov Nimrodi, who helped build SAVAK.

In 1980 Ghorbanifar was the liaison between the Shah's last Prime Minister, Shahpour Bakhtiar, in exile in Paris, and conspirators in the Iranian armed forces organising what is sometimes known as the Nojeh Coup. The plot was exposed, and hundreds of officers were arrested at Nojeh Air Base on 9–10 July 1980. Ghorbanifar had owned a shipping company and headed the logistics branch of the Niqab network which organised the civilian part of the plot. He had been recommended for the role by Bakhtiar. Some Iranian sources later accused Ghorbanifar of leaking information to the Iranian government which helped thwart the coup plot. In December 1985 Adnan Khashoggi said in an interview that Ghorbanifar was head of European intelligence under Mir-Hossein Mousavi, Iran's Prime Minister from 1981.

In 1981 Ghorbanifar was the source for the Washington Post's stories about Libyan hit squads targeting President Ronald Reagan and other senior US figures; in 1986 he said he had created the story "to hurt Libya, an enemy of Israel". Ghorbanifar's contribution to the Libyan story contributed to the CIA's 1984 decision to issue a "burn notice" against Ghorbanifar.

In the early 1980s Ghorbanifar accompanied Cyrus Hashemi to Israel to arrange a $50 million arms shipment, codenamed "Cosmos", to Iran. The deal was cancelled at the last minute with much of the equipment already loaded onto a ship in Eilat.

== Iran–Contra affair ==
In the 1980s, Ghorbanifar's initial American contacts were National Security Council staffers Oliver North and Michael Ledeen. Ledeen vouched for Ghorbanifar to National Security Adviser Robert McFarlane. North later claimed that Ghorbanifar had given him the idea for diverting profits from TOW and HAWK missile sales to Iran to the Nicaraguan Contras.

Ghorbanifar's suspected duplicity during the Iran–Contra deal led CIA Director William Casey to order three separate lie-detector tests, all of which he failed. Iranian officials also suspected Ghorbanifar of passing them forged American documents. The CIA issued a burn notice (or "Fabricator Notice") on Ghorbanifar in 1984, meaning he was regarded as an unreliable source of intelligence, and a 1987 congressional report on Iran–Contra by the Congressional Committees Investigating The Iran-Contra Affair cites the CIA warning that Ghorbanifar "should be regarded as an intelligence fabricator and a nuisance".

His own cohorts in the arms-for-hostages affair were also incredulous. "I knew him to be a liar," North eventually acknowledged. Ronald Reagan had described Ghorbanifar as a "devious character". Robert McFarlane, the national security adviser who approved the Iran–Contra arms trades, once described Ghorbanifar as "one of the most despicable characters I have ever met." Former CIA official and Iran-Contra figure George Cave, who was involved in the 1984 decision to issue the burn notice, has described Ghorbanifar as "the most totally amoral person I have ever met". Thomas Twetten, Chief of the Near East Division of the CIA's Directorate of Operations at the time, said of him: "This is a guy who lies with zest."

According to a report in Time, Ghorbanifar's links with the CIA led to internal disputes, with the counter-terrorism division supporting him and Middle East officers attempting to discredit him. Ghorbanifar's anger at being labelled a liar may have led him to urge Iranian contacts to leak the Iran-Contra story. The affair first became public in a Lebanese newspaper, apparently leaked by Mehdi Hashemi.

== French–Lebanese hostage crisis ==
Ghorbanifar has been suspected of being a former French DGSE informer, and allegedly accompanied Jean-Charles Marchiani, the right-hand man of former French Interior Minister Charles Pasqua, during his meetings with the deputy Iranian foreign minister to negotiate the release of the French hostages in Lebanon in the mid-1980s.

== War on terrorism ==
In December 2001 Michael Ledeen organized a three-day meeting in Rome between Ghorbanifar and US Defense Intelligence Agency officials Larry Franklin and Harold Rhode. Also present were two officials from Italy's SISMI. In addition to a position at the American Enterprise Institute, Ledeen was working as a consultant to then U.S. Undersecretary of Defense for Policy Douglas Feith, who oversaw the Office of Special Plans. The 2001 meeting took place with the approval of then-Deputy National Security Advisor Stephen Hadley. The meeting concerned a secret offer from reportedly dissident Iranian officials to provide information relevant to the war on terrorism and Iran's relationship with terrorists in Afghanistan.

Prior to the Iraq War, Ghorbanifar had passed allegations to the Bush administration that "enriched uranium was smuggled from Iraq into Iran and some may remain hidden in Iraq" which the CIA later discovered to be a fabrication. Ghorbanifar was linked to the Niger uranium forgeries which were forged documents initially released by SISMI that would later be used partly as justification for the Iraq War.

Summer 2003 news reports of the meetings prompted an internal review, as well as an investigation by the U.S. Senate Intelligence Committee. Secretary of Defense Donald Rumsfeld characterized the meetings as insignificant, saying, "There wasn't anything there that was of substance or of value that needed to be pursued further." News reports also indicated that Ghorbanifar sought to be paid for the middleman role. Subsequent contacts with Ghorbanifar were abandoned.

Ghorbanifar has emerged as the probable origin of the information cited by Congressman Curt Weldon's book, Countdown to Terror: The Top-Secret Information that Could Prevent the Next Terrorist Attack on America... and How the CIA has Ignored it (Regnery Publishing, June 2005) ISBN 0-89526-005-0. Weldon cites an anonymous source, "Ali," believed to be Fereydoun Mahdavi, a former Iranian minister of commerce before the Iranian Revolution who is a close associate of Ghorbanifar.
