= Joe King (American football coach) =

American football coach (born c. 1948)

Biographical details
- Born: c. 1948 (age 77–78); Ballston Spa, New York, U.S.
- Education: Siena College (1970)

Playing career

Football
- 1966–1969: Siena

Baseball
- 1966–1969: Siena

Coaching career (HC unless noted)

Football
- 1972–1973: St. Peter's HS (NY)
- 1974–1980: Watervliet HS (NY)
- 1981–1985: RPI (assistant)
- 1986–1988: RPI (AHC)
- 1989–2010: RPI

Baseball
- 1972–1973: St. Peter's HS (NY)

Track and field
- ?–2010: RPI

Administrative career (AD unless noted)
- 1972–1973: St. Peter's HS (NY)
- 2003–2010: RPI (assistant AD)

Head coaching record
- Overall: 152–59–1 (college football); 52–23–3 (high school football)
- Bowls: 8–0
- Tournaments: 3–3 (NCAA D-III playoffs)

Accomplishments and honors

Championships
- 6 UCAA / Liberty League (1997–1999, 2001, 2003, 2007)

Awards
- 5× Liberty League Coach of the Year

Joe King (born c. 1948) is an American former college football coach. He was the head football coach for St. Peter's High School from 1972 to 1973, Watervliet High School from 1974 to 1980, and for Rensselaer Polytechnic Institute (RPI) from 1989 to 2010. He played college football for Siena.

King retired as RPI's all-time leader in wins.

== Head coaching record ==
=== College football ===
Year	Team	Overall	Conference	Standing	Bowl/playoffs	D3^{#}
RPI Engineers (Independent College Athletic Conference) (1989)
1989	RPI	3–6	1–1	4th		
RPI Engineers (NCAA Division III independent) (1990–1995)
1990	RPI	6–1–2				
1991	RPI	4–5				
1992	RPI	8–2			W Northeast	
1993	RPI	8–2			W Northwest	
1994	RPI	8–1				
1995	RPI	8–2			W Northwest	
RPI Engineers (Upstate Collegiate Athletic Association / Liberty League) (1996–2010)
1996	RPI	5–4	2–2	3rd		
1997	RPI	9–1	4–0	1st	W Northeast	
1998	RPI	7–2	3–1	T–1st		
1999	RPI	9–1	4–0	1st	L NCAA Division III First Round	
2000	RPI	3–6	1–3	4th		
2001	RPI	8–1	4–0	1st		
2002	RPI	8–2	2–2	3rd	W Northeast	
2003	RPI	11–2	3–1	T–1st	L NCAA Division III Semifinal	5
2004	RPI	5–4	4–3	3rd		
2005	RPI	8–2	5–2	3rd	W Northwest	
2006	RPI	7–3	3–3	T–4th	W Northeast	
2007	RPI	8–2	6–1	T–1st	L NCAA Division III First Round	
2008	RPI	8–2	5–2	2nd	W North Atlantic	
2009	RPI	5–4	3–4	5th		
2010	RPI	6–4	4–2	2nd		
RPI:		152–59–1	54–27			
Total:		152–59–1				
National championship Conference title Conference division title or championship game berth
