= List of radio stations in Iran =

A list of radio stations in Iran

== Islamic Republic of Iran Broadcasting (IRIB) Domestic Stations ==
- IRIB Radio Iran (National Radio)
- IRIB Radio Farhang (Culture)
- IRIB Radio Payam (Info & Entertainment)
- IRIB Radio Quran (Holy Quran)
- IRIB Radio Maaref (Education)
- IRIB Radio Javan (Youth)
- IRIB Radio Varzesh (Sports)
- IRIB Radio Salamat (Health)
- IRIB Radio Eghtesad (Economy & Business)
- IRIB Radio Namayesh (Arts)
- IRIB Radio Ava (Music)
- IRIB Radio Goftogoo (Interviews)
- IRIB Radio Saba
- IRIB Radio Talavat
- IRIB Radio Monasebati
- IRIB Radio Ziarat

== IRIB Foreign Stations ==
- IRIB World Service (Broadcast in many languages)

== IRIB Provincial Stations ==
- IRIB Radio Abadan (Khuzestan province)
- IRIB Radio Arak (Markazi province)
- IRIB Radio Ardabil (Ardabil province)
- IRIB Radio Alborz (Alborz province)
- IRIB Radio Ahvaz (Khuzestan province)
- IRIB Radio Bandar Abbas (Hormozgan province)
- IRIB Radio Birjand (South Khorasan province)
- IRIB Radio Borujerd (Lorestan province)
- IRIB Radio Bushehr (Bushehr province)
- IRIB Radio Bojnord (North Khorasan province)
- IRIB Radio Dezful (Khuzestan province)
- IRIB Radio Gorgan (Golestan province)
- IRIB Radio Gilan (Gilan province)
- IRIB Radio Hamadan (Hamadan province)
- IRIB Radio Isfahan (Isfahan province)
- IRIB Radio Ilam (Ilam province)
- IRIB Radio Kerman (Kerman province)
- IRIB Radio Kermanshah (Kermanshah province)
- IRIB Radio Kish (Hormozgan province)
- IRIB Radio Lorestan (Lorestan province)
- IRIB Radio Mashhad (Razavi Khorasan province)
- IRIB Radio Malayer (Hamadan province)
- IRIB Radio Mahabad (West Azerbaijan province)
- IRIB Radio Maragheh (East Azerbaijan province)
- IRIB Radio Qazvin (Qazvin province)
- IRIB Radio Qom (Qom province)
- IRIB Radio Sanandaj (Kurdistan province)
- IRIB Radio Sari (Mazandaran province)
- IRIB Radio Shahr-e Kord (Chaharmahal and Bakhtiari province)
- IRIB Radio Semnan (Semnan province)
- IRIB Radio Shiraz (Fars province)
- IRIB Radio Tehran (Tehran province)
- IRIB Radio Tabriz (East Azerbaijan province)
- IRIB Radio Urmia (West Azerbaijan province)
- IRIB Radio Yasuj (Kohgiluyeh and Boyer-Ahmad province)
- IRIB Radio Yazd (Yazd province)
- IRIB Radio Zahedan (Sistan and Baluchestan province)
- IRIB Radio Zanjan (Zanjan province)
