= Operation Staunch =

1983 diplomatic initiative by the United States

Operation Staunch was launched in the spring of 1983 by the United States State Department to stop the flow of U.S. arms to Iran.

== Background ==
The Iranian Islamic Revolution in 1979 and the hostage crisis in Tehran frustrated American policymakers whose response came as an embargo on the new government of Iran. On January 20, 1981, the day Ronald Reagan was inaugurated, the hostages in Tehran were released. In turn, the embargo was relaxed, but relations with Iran did not improve diplomatically. In fact, the newly elected Reagan refused to sell arms directly to Iran. Even so, arms manufactured in the US that were sold to foreign nations continued to find their way to the Iranian military arsenal. The Iran–Iraq War raised the demand for arms and "created opportunities that arms merchants around the world simply could not afford to miss. Indeed, the lure of windfall profits was so great that few countries had any scruples about selling weapons to Iran or Iraq—or both at the same time."

In response, The State Department dispatched special envoy Richard Fairbanks, who "spoke with diplomats, intelligence officers and arms industry officials" in targeted Arab countries as well as South Korea, Italy, Spain and Portugal. The State Department successfully dissuaded American allies from selling American arms to Iran on the tenet, created by Iran's association with Hezbollah, that Iran sponsors terrorism.

== Iran-Contra affair ==
Between 1981 and 1986, the US was secretly facilitating the sale of arms to Iran, in direct contradiction of Operation Staunch. Known as the Iran–Contra affair, it proved humiliating for the United States when the story first broke in November 1986 that the US itself was selling arms to Iran.
