= Yaakov Nimrodi =

Israeli military attaché (1926–2023)

- יעקב נמרודי
- Born: 1 June 1926; Jerusalem, Mandatory Palestine
- Died: 21 August 2023 (aged 97)
- Occupations: Businessman; Intelligence officer
- Known for: Chairman of Maariv; Arms trade
- Children: Ofer Nimrodi
- Military career
- Allegiance: Israel
- Branch: Israel Defense Forces
- Service years: 1940s–1979
- Rank: Military attaché (Iran)
- Other work: Arms dealer

Yaakov Nimrodi (Hebrew: יעקב נמרודי; 1 June 1926 – 21 August 2023) was an Israeli businessman and intelligence officer. Nimrodi, the father of Ofer Nimrodi, was the chairman of Maariv, which he acquired in 1992.

== Biography ==
Yaakov Nimrodi was born in Jerusalem on 1 June 1926, as one of ten children of an Iraqi-Jewish family. He was recruited into intelligence work at the age of 16, by Yitzhak Navon, a childhood friend who later became President of Israel. Nimrodi joined a special unit of the Palmach which specialized in gathering intelligence on Arab countries.

After Israeli independence in 1948, he was assigned to a military intelligence unit in the south of Israel, where he met Ariel Sharon, later Prime Minister of Israel. In 1956, he was appointed the IDF military attaché and Israel Defense Ministry representative in Tehran. There he was involved in Israel's large-scale arms sales to Iran in the 1960s. "No Israeli representative in Iran during the Shah's regime was more significant or influential than Nimrodi." During this time Nimrodi provided "advice and training" to Iran's SAVAK secret service.

Nimrodi died on 21 August 2023, at the age of 97.

== Business career ==
Nimrodi returned to Israel after the fall of the Shah of Iran in 1979, but continued to be involved in arms trading, including a $135 million sale of arms to Iran in 1981. Nimrodi played a central role in the early stages of the Iran-Contra affair. He published a book on the affair in 2004.

In 1987 Nimrodi acquired Israel Land Development Company for $26m. In 1992, he bought the Israeli newspaper Maariv.

== Published works ==
- התקווה והמחד: פרשת איראנגייט, Maariv Publishing, 2004 (Irangate: A Hope Shattered)
