= House October Surprise Task Force =

1992 U.S. government commission

- Abbreviation: HOSTF
- Formation: March 1992
- Dissolved: January 1993
- Purpose: To investigate the October Surprise allegations
- Location: Washington, D.C.
- Chairman: Rep. Lee H. Hamilton (D-Ind)
- Vice-Chairman: Rep. Henry Hyde (R-Ill)
- Chief Counsel: Lawrence Barcella
- Chief Minority Counsel: Richard J. Leon
- Parent organization: Committee on Foreign Affairs of the United States House of Representatives
- Budget: $1.35m

The House October Surprise Task Force (formally Task Force of the Committee on Foreign Affairs to Investigate Certain Allegations Concerning the Holding of Americans as Hostages by Iran in 1980) was a task force instituted by the United States House of Representatives in 1992 to examine the 1980 October Surprise theory which theorized that, during the 1980 United States presidential election, the Reagan campaign successfully negotiated with the government of Iran for a solution to the Iran hostage crisis that would not occur until after the election, so as to prevent President Jimmy Carter, Reagan's opponent, from getting an electoral boost.

The Joint report of the Task Force to Investigate Certain Allegations Concerning the Holding of American Hostages by Iran in 1980 was published on January 3, 1993. Shortly afterwards, Task Force chairman Rep. Lee H. Hamilton published an editorial in The New York Times in which he summarized the Task Force conclusion as being that "there was virtually no credible evidence to support the accusations."

== Background ==
The House October Surprise Task Force followed investigation of related matters in the Iran-Contra affair by the Tower Commission, in which the October Surprise allegations had already been aired, and rejected. Media investigations of the October Surprise theory took off in 1991 following the publication in April of a New York Times editorial by Gary Sick and a PBS Frontline documentary, and there were calls for a Congressional investigation.

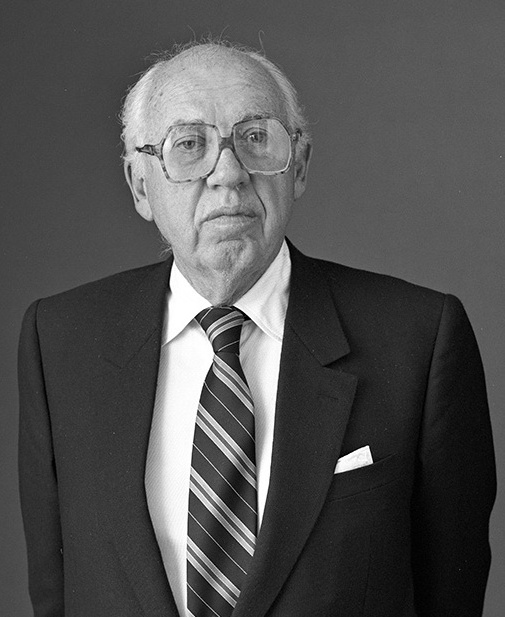
William Casey

In October 1991, the Senate's Foreign Relations Committee approved an investigation; but the bill to fund the $600,000 budget was filibustered by Republicans. Some hearings were held by the Senate Foreign Relations Subcommmitte on Near East and South Asian Affairs (then chaired by Terry Sanford) in November 1991, until an unnamed Republican senator, invoking a rarely used rule requiring Senate permission for committees to hold formal hearings, filed an objection, bringing the hearing to a close whilst Gary Sick was testifying. In December 1991 Sanford and Senator James M. Jeffords appointed a special counsel to investigate. This report, published on 19 November 1992, concluded that there was probably no Republican deal to delay hostage release, but that William Casey (Reagan's campaign director) "probably 'conducted informal, clandestine and potentially dangerous efforts' on the campaign's behalf to monitor the hostage situation."

In early February 1992 the House of Representatives voted to launch an investigation, with no Republican support and 34 Democrats opposing. This became the House October Surprise Task Force.

== Personnel ==
As Speaker of the United States House, Tom Foley (D-WA) appointed Democrats Lee Hamilton (D-IN), Stephen Solarz (D-NY), Sam Gejdenson (D-CT), Mervyn Dymally (D-CA), Robert Torricelli (D-NJ), Howard Berman (D-CA), Ed Feighan (D-OH), and Ted Weiss (D-NY). In consultation with the Republican Party's leadership, Foley also appointed Republicans Henry Hyde (R-IL), Jim Leach (R-IA), Olympia Snowe (R-ME), Doug Bereuter (R-NE), and Porter Goss (R-FL). Hamilton served as the Task Force's chairman and Hyde was the ranking Republican.

The Task Force was run by people with experience with the related Iran-Contra affair. Hamilton had previously chaired the House Select Committee to Investigate Covert Arms Transactions with Iran, and Hyde had also been a member of that committee. The Committee's 1987 report (jointly with a Senate committee, as the Congressional Committees Investigating The Iran-Contra Affair) mentioned the October Surprise in a paragraph-long footnote, noting only that the Reagan campaign said it had rejected approaches from "individuals who claimed to be Iranian intermediaries."

The Task Force's Chief Counsel, Lawrence Barcella, was a former federal prosecutor best known for the Edwin P. Wilson case; in 1985 Barcella had given a legal opinion to an unnamed government official on giving the go-ahead to an Iran-Contra-related private weapons shipment. BCCI had been used by Oliver North as part of the Iran-Contra operations. Hamilton blocked the proposed appointment to the Task Force staff of R. Spencer Oliver, then Chief Counsel of the United States House Committee on Foreign Affairs, after Hyde objected. Oliver had pressed for the investigation and suspected the claims were true, which "raised a red flag with the minority", Hamilton later explained. The Task Force's Chief Minority Counsel, Richard J. Leon, had been Deputy Chief Minority Counsel in the Congressional Iran-Contra investigation.

For the month of June 1992, Peggy Adler was employed by the Task Force as an Assistant Investigator.

== Process ==
The Task Force had a bipartisan staff of lawyers and investigators, which "conducted over 230 formal interviews and depositions, many with witnesses whose statements had never been taken under oath... analyzed hundreds of thousands of documents, including raw intelligence information... [and] reviewed thousands of records held by individuals, including ex-Iranian officials."

The Senate report in November 1992 said it hoped the House Task Force would be able to address various unanswered questions. Associated Press noted that "circumstances 'suggest a willful effort to prevent' investigators from having timely access to other papers, the report said."

In 2017, a declassified CIA 1980 memo was released in which the "Agency had concluded Iranian hardliners such as Ayatollah Khomeini were 'determined to exploit the hostage issue to bring about President Carter's defeat in the November elections.'" According to MuckRock, the findings appear "to have been either unavailable to or ignored by those composing the Joint Report of the October Surprise Task Force."

== Published report ==
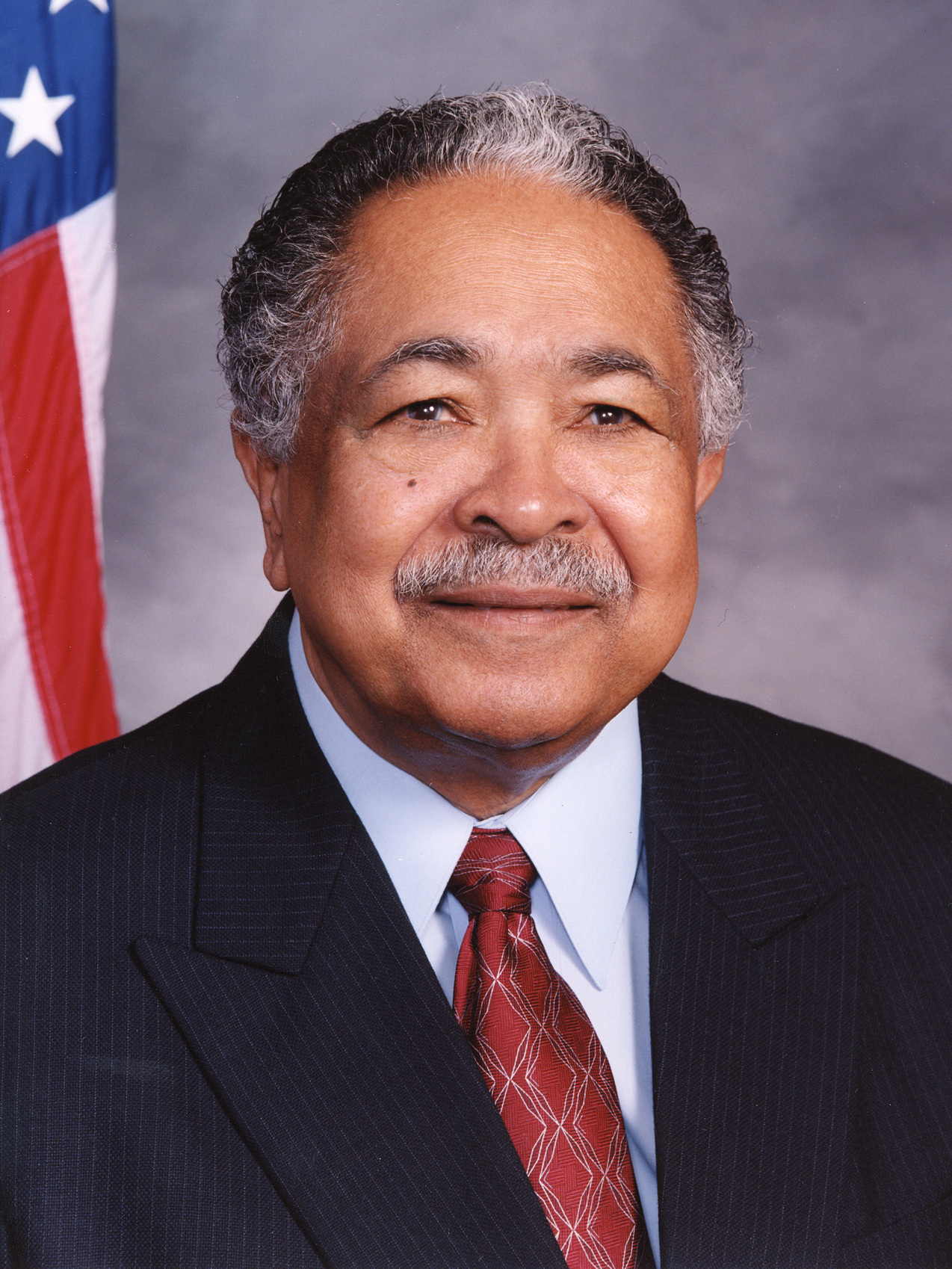
Mervyn Dymally

Mervyn Dymally refused to sign the final report. On January 3, Dymally submitted a dissenting opinion to the final report, declaring, in relation to the report's treatment of evidence for the crucial Madrid meeting, that "just because phones ring and planes fly doesn't mean that someone is there to answer the phone or is on the plane." Dymally said that Representative Lee H. Hamilton had warned him that if he did not withdraw his dissent "I will have to come down hard on you." The following day Hamilton (in a move he later insisted was unconnected) fired the entire staff of the Africa subcommittee, which Dymally had chaired before his retirement from Congress, which had just taken effect." Hoping to save his former staffers' jobs, Dymally agreed to withdraw his dissent, but refused to put his name to the official report.

== Conclusions ==
The final report, published on 13 January 1993, concluded "there is no credible evidence supporting any attempt by the Reagan presidential campaign—or persons associated with the campaign—to delay the release of the American hostages in Iran". Hamilton also added that the vast majority of the sources and material reviewed by the committee were "wholesale fabricators or were impeached by documentary evidence". The report also expressed the belief that several witnesses had committed perjury during their sworn statements to the committee, among them Richard Brenneke, who claimed to be a CIA agent.

== Criticisms ==
In his 2024 book, Den of Spies: Reagan, Carter, and the Secret History of the Treason That Stole the White House, Craig Unger criticizes the investigation of the House October Surprise Task Force, describing what he says is "the mountain of evidence that had been discounted, ignored, or outright dismissed."
