= Robert Booth Nichols =

American businessman and actor

- Born: March 6, 1943; Los Angeles, US
- Died: February 16, 2009 (aged 65); Geneva, Switzerland
- Education: Glendale Junior College
- Occupations: businessman, actor

Robert Booth Nichols was an American businessman, part-time actor, and alleged intelligence operative. Throughout his life, Nichols was associated with various clandestine activities and maintained connections with high-level government officials, leading to speculation about his involvement in covert operations and alleged conspiracies such as Iran–Contra, the Inslaw affair, CIA drug trafficking, the 1980 October Surprise and the death of Danny Casolaro.

== Early life ==
Born in Los Angeles, California, Nichols graduated from Hollywood Professional School and furthered his education at Glendale Junior College, before leaving college and working for a security alarm company in Hawaii and later in Glendale, California for a construction company. Around this time, he was recruited by “parties that claimed to be with or stated they were with U.S. intelligence”, who gave him protection and immunity from federal law.

== Business activities ==
Robert Booth Nichols was the founder of Meridian International Logistics, a weapons dealer and logistics company. The company allegedly served as a front for clandestine activities, including intelligence operations, weapons smuggling and financial dealings connected to organized crime and the drug trade. Nichols worked with Wackenhut to arm the Contras in Nicaragua on the Cabazon Reservation. In 1981, a man named Fred Alvarez and two others died on the reservation in an unsolved murder case. Michael Riconosciuto, who was the vice president of Meridian Arms, confessed to have transformed the PROMIS software stolen from Inslaw into spyware.

Robert Booth Nichols was a member of the board of directors of the company FIDCO from the late 1970s to the early 1980s. In 1992 he founded the company Pacific Rim Services.

According to FBI agent Thomas Gate, he was the business partner of mobster Sam Giancana and possibly connected to the yakuza in Hawaii.

== Alleged connections to intelligence ==
Nichols stated that he had been recruited by the CIA in the 1960s while living in Hawaii. He purportedly gathered intelligence until 1986 in nations including Nigeria, Saudi Arabia, Thailand, India, Japan, Mexico, Costa Rica, Haiti, Norway and France. He stated that he had been stabbed in Australia in 1972 and shot in Cameroon. After supposedly leaving the CIA in the 1980s, he is said to have entered the business of money laundering and arms dealing. His extensive network reportedly included contacts within the highest echelons of power and claimed he was personally managed by US Secretary of Defense Frank Carlucci. Nichols also claimed to have been protected from prosecution and that he never had to pay taxes. Nichols is said to have been involved in the 1980 October Surprise and other covert operations.

In a 2008 deposition, Nichols admitted uncertainty about his employment with the CIA, stating that while his employers informed him of such affiliations, he could not confirm their veracity. Inslaw founder William A. Hamilton described Nichols as credible, while attorney and former CIA employee Robert Maheu described Nichols as “phony”.

== Involvement in the film industry ==
He served as a technical advisor on the 1992 film Under Siege and appeared in the film in a small speaking role. He also appeared in the movies Full Metal Jacket and Ups and Downs.

Nichols was an advisor for MCA in the 1980s and 1990s. In 1987, he was suspected by the FBI of being involved with MCA in a $500 million stock fraud and for his alleged ties to the Gambino crime family.

== Connections to Sam Israel ==
Nichols was involved in the Ponzi scheme of Samuel Israel III, whom he met in 2004. He is said to have introduced Israel to a secret shadow market of the Federal Reserve that supposedly exists and in which intelligence services, organized crime and high finance enrich themselves illegally, by selling treasury notes at a discount to select insiders and laundering the profits over charities. Israel allegedly paid Nichols $10 million to locate a secret treasury note that was an IOU for gold worth $250 billion. Nichols allegedly tried to steal the note. This is said to have destabilized money markets and contributed to the 2008 financial crisis.

Nichols testified as a witness at the trial after the collapse of Israel's hedge fund Bayou. Nichols named John Prescott Ellis as involved in the scheme and claimed that George Soros got his money on this black market.

== Death ==
He died "mysteriously" in Geneva in 2009 according to reports.

== Portrayal in media ==
Nichols's life and alleged activities have been the subject of the Netflix show American Conspiracy: The Octopus Murders. He was in contact with the journalist Danny Casolaro before the latter's death. At the time of his death, Casolaro was attempting to link the Inslaw affair with the October Surprise allegations, the Iran–Contra affair, and the Bank of Credit and Commerce International scandal into a "grand unified conspiracy" that he called "the Octopus".

He also appeared in the book Octopus: Sam Israel, the Secret Market, and Wall Street's Wildest Con by Guy Lawson.
