= Death of Charles C. Morgan =

1977 unsolved death in Arizona, U.S.

Chuck Morgan
- Born: Charles Curtis Morgan; March 16, 1938; Everett, Washington, U.S.
- Disappeared: June 7, 1977
- Status: Found dead
- Died: Sonoran Desert, Arizona, U.S.
- Cause of death: Gunshot to the head
- Body discovered: June 18, 1977
- Education: University of Arizona
- Occupations: Escrow-company executive, businessman, escrow agent
- Organization(s): Statewide Escrow Service, Inc.
- Spouse: Ruth Eileen Ostrow Morgan
- Children: 4

Charles Curtis "Chuck" Morgan was an American escrow agent who was found dead on June 18, 1977, in the Sonoran Desert, approximately 40 miles west of Tucson, Arizona. He had sustained a fatal gunshot wound to the head.

The Pima County Sheriff's Department (PCSD) classified Morgan's death as a suicide, while the medical examiner's office treated the case as unresolved. Unusual circumstances surrounding his death, along with his reported involvement in complex financial and real estate transactions, have contributed to speculation about the possibility of foul play.

Morgan's death has also been discussed in connection with the deaths of Doug Johnston and Danny Casolaro, both of which have attracted attention because of questions surrounding their circumstances. However, any connection between the three cases remains unproven.

Morgan's case was featured on the television documentary series Unsolved Mysteries. As of 2026, the circumstances of his death remain unresolved.

== Victim background ==
Charles Curtis "Chuck" Morgan was born on March 16th, 1938 in Everett, Washington to Leonard and Doris Morgan. His parents moved the family to Tucson, Arizona, when Chuck was still very young, and two younger sons were subsequently born into the family: Michael King Morgan and Tom Kay Morgan.

Around the age of 18, Chuck attended the University of Arizona, where he served as president of his freshman class and participated in several student organizations, including Lambda Chi Alpha and the university rifle team.

On October 8, 1959, Chuck Morgan, at 20 years old, married Ruth Eileen Ostrow in Kootenai, Idaho.

Over time, Chuck established himself as an escrow agent based in the Tucson, Arizona, area, handling real estate and financial transactions. He became involved in complex land dealings, developing professional connections within Arizona's real estate and business communities. Ultimately, he built a reputation as an experienced escrow professional overseeing high-value transactions.

== Disappearances and death ==
=== Initial disappearance ===
On March 22, 1977, Charles "Chuck" Morgan departed from his residency in Tucson, Arizona, to take two of his daughters to school. After dropping them off, he disappeared.

Three days later at approximately 2 a.m., Chuck suddenly arrived back at his home. Upon his return, his wife, Ruth, observed that her husband was missing one shoe and had a plastic restraint fastened around one ankle with his hands bound together with a plastic zip tie. She noted that he appeared frightened and disheveled. Unable to speak, he communicated to her by writing on a pad of paper, conveying to her in writing that he had been abducted and subjected to torture during his absence. Chuck further disclosed that a hallucinogenic substance had forcibly been applied to his throat and warned that ingesting it could either cause him to lose his sanity or prove fatal.

He instructed Ruth to relocate his vehicle, explaining that he did not want "them" to realize that he had returned home, all the while refusing to identify who "they" were that he spoke of. Chuck also persuaded his wife against contacting law enforcement, claiming that doing so would result in a contract hit being placed on the lives of the family.

For an entire week, Ruth nursed Chuck back to health and gradually restored his strength by feeding him with an eye dropper. Before he regained his voice, Chuck began revealing his concealed identity, unveiling that he worked as a Federal Agent tasked with combating organized crime in the United States. He further alleged that "they" had confiscated his US Treasury identification before he managed to escape from his unnamed captors near Phoenix Sky Harbor International Airport.

Following his abduction, Chuck grew increasingly fearful for his own safety. He began wearing a bulletproof vest and grew a beard in an effort to further camouflage his typical appearance. Chuck also took it upon himself to transport his daughters to and from their school whilst notifying school officials that no one else was authorized to pick them up.

=== Second disappearance ===
On June 7, two months after his initial disappearance, Morgan went missing once more. Right before he disappeared for the second time, Chuck informed his father that if anything were to happen to him, a letter he had written would identify those responsible. Said letter was never recovered.

Nine days later, an unidentified woman telephoned Ruth and stated: "Chuck is alright, Ecclesiastes 12:1–8." The referenced citation corresponds to a passage from the Hebrew Bible which reads in part: "Men are afraid of heights and of dangers in the streets. Remember Him before the silver cord is severed and the golden bowl is broken. Then the dust returns to the Earth as it was, and the spirit returns to God who gave it."

=== Body discovery ===
Two days thereafter, Morgan was discovered deceased from a fatal gunshot wound, despite being found wearing a ballistic vest. His lifeless body was uncovered in the Sonoran Desert, approximately thirty feet off the highway in the San Juan Hot Springs area. His car, a Mercury Cougar, had been parked within the vicinity of his corpse. Chuck had been shot once in the back of the head with a round from his own .357 Smith & Wesson Magnum, which lay beside him. Authorities detected gunshot residue on his left hand, suggesting he had recently discharged a firearm. However, no identifiable fingerprint markings of Chuck's showed up on the pistol.

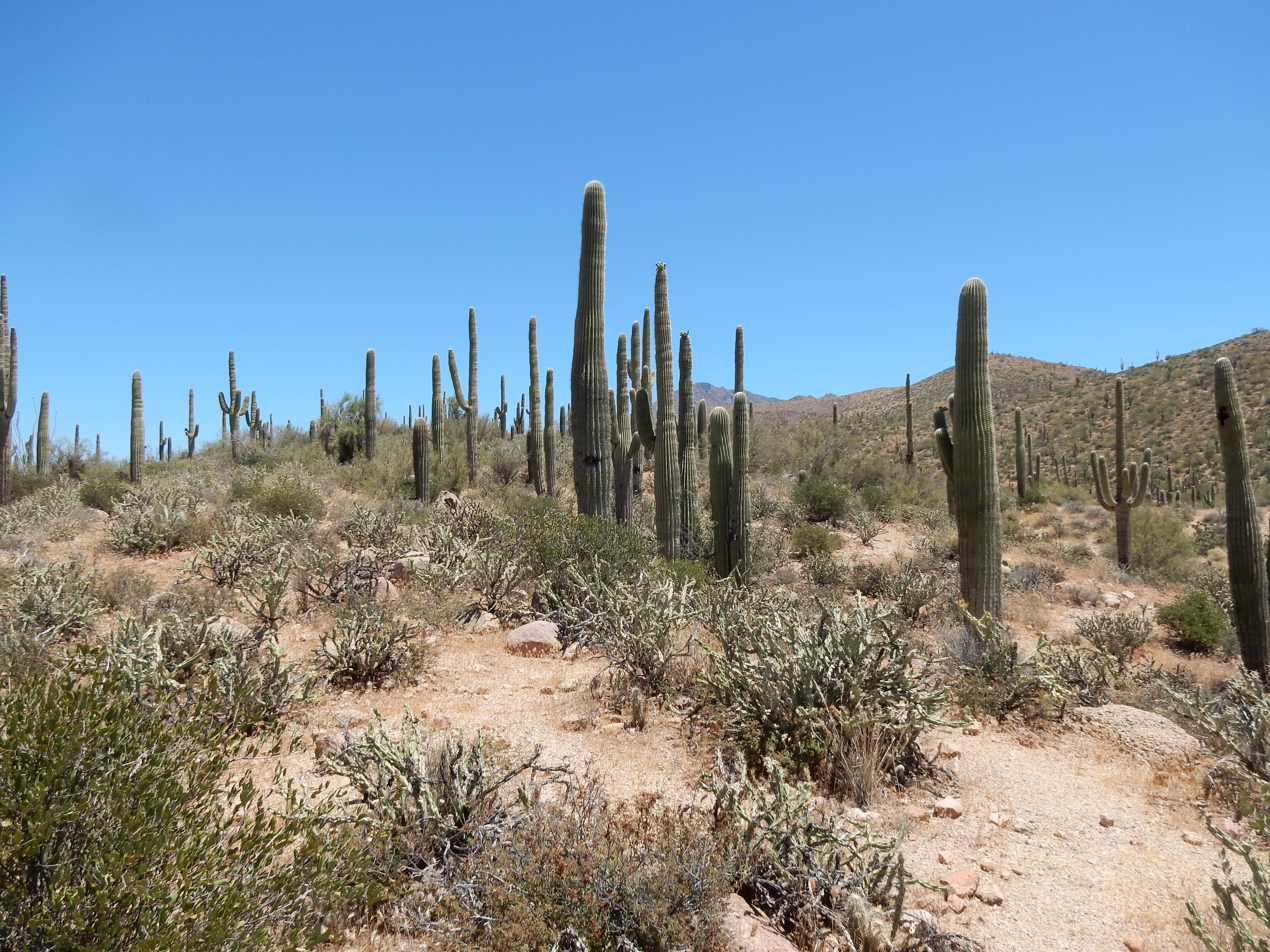
The Sonoran Desert, where Charles C. Morgan's dead body was discovered

Upon searching inside his vehicle, authorities uncovered a handwritten note providing directions to the same location where Chuck's body was found. His car also contained multiple firearms, ammunition, and a CB radio. In an unusual detail, a fragment of one of his teeth was discovered wrapped in a white handkerchief on the back seat, along with a pair of sunglasses that apparently did not belong to him.

Furthermore, Chuck had slipped a US two-dollar bill inside his undergarments. Inscribed on the banknote were a total of seven Spanish names labeled with the letters 'A' through 'G'. A written notation referencing the biblical passage excerpt Ecclesiastes 12 also appeared, with verses '1' through '8' indicated by arrows etched toward the bill's serial number — the very same biblical reference cited by the unidentified female caller. On the reverse side, the graphic depicting the signers of the Declaration of Independence (which appear on the back of a standard US $2) were numbered one through seven, and a rudimentary map was sketched depicting several roads between Tucson and the Mexico–United States border. The Arizona towns of Robles Junction and Sasabe were specifically marked — both areas reportedly associated with smuggling activity.

Forty-eight hours after Chuck's death, an unidentified woman contacted an officer with the Pima County Sheriff's Department by telephone. She stated that Chuck had arranged to meet her at a local motel shortly before he died. Identifying herself only by the moniker "Green Eyes", the lady claimed to have been the same individual who had previously called Ruth. "Green Eyes" further alleged that during a meeting at the motel, Chuck showed her a briefcase containing several thousand dollars in cash, explaining that the funds were intended to buy his way out of a contract that had been placed on his life by an unnamed criminal organization.

== Investigation and aftermath ==
The Pima County Sheriff's Department ultimately ruled Chuck Morgan's death a suicide, disregarding the suspicious factors which, as of 2026, remain without a satisfactory explanation. Police detectives theorized that Morgan had chosen to take his own life on account of financial strain as well as concerns about his personal safety. The investigation was officially closed on August 10th, 1977.

Shortly after Chuck Morgan's corpse had been located, his impounded car was broken into while in police possession. Around the same time, his office was found in disarray, having been thoroughly ransacked. Several weeks later, two men identifying themselves as FBI agents arrived at the Morgan residence and conducted a search of the property.

Weeks prior to his death, Chuck Morgan had also served as a confidential witness in a large-scale land fraud investigation and was questioned in connection with the matter in May 1977. Moreover, investigative reports indicate that prior to his eventual demise, Chuck Morgan was spotted at multiple restaurants and motels in Tucson's West Side after his disappearance.

== Murder theory ==
The circumstances surrounding Morgan's death have led to speculation that he was murdered rather than having died by suicide. Although the Pima County Sheriff's Department classified his death as a suicide, some commentators and researchers have questioned that conclusion, citing unusual aspects of the case and events preceding his death. The possibility of homicide remains a prominent theory among those who have examined the case, although it has not been conclusively established.

=== Alleged links to organized crime ===
Some accounts of the case have suggested that Morgan's death may have been connected to organized crime and that he may have attempted to avert a contract killing. According to this theory, Morgan's efforts to escape the alleged threat were unsuccessful, ultimately resulting in his death. However, the available accounts do not conclusively establish that a contract killing was planned or that Morgan's death was orchestrated by organized-crime figures.

Arizona's real-estate market and financial sector attracted scrutiny during the 1970s because of allegations involving land fraud, money laundering, and organized criminal activity. Some accounts have described the use of numbered blind trust accounts in real-estate transactions as a means of concealing the identities of property owners and investors.

Morgan's work as an escrow agent reportedly brought him into contact with individuals involved in complex land transactions. Some accounts have alleged that his professional dealings included transactions associated with the Bonanno crime family, an Italian-American Mafia organization historically based in New York City, as well as business interests associated with Arizona businessman Ned Warren Sr. and alleged land-fraud operations. The precise nature of these dealings, and whether they were connected to Morgan's death, remains unclear.

=== Johnston–Casolaro connection ===
Some researchers have explored possible connections between Morgan's death and the deaths of Peter Douglas "Doug" Johnston and investigative journalist Danny Casolaro. These cases have attracted interest because of reported connections to financial dealings, alleged criminal networks, and investigations into government misconduct. However, a direct connection between the three deaths has not been conclusively established.

Investigative journalist Don Devereux examined Morgan's case and investigated allegations involving organized crime and financial misconduct in the American Southwest. Devereux's work on the case included examining events preceding Morgan's death and exploring possible connections to other individuals and investigations.

==== Doug Johnston ====
Peter Douglas "Doug" Johnston was a businessman whose name has appeared in accounts examining Morgan's professional activities and possible connections to land-related financial dealings. Journalist Don Devereux and other researchers have explored whether Johnston possessed information relevant to Morgan's business activities or professional associates.

The precise nature of Johnston's relationship with Morgan, including the extent of any shared business interests or knowledge of Morgan's activities, remains uncertain. The proposed connection between Johnston's death and Morgan's case has not been conclusively demonstrated.

==== Danny Casolaro ====
In 1991, Devereux was contacted by freelance investigative journalist Joseph Daniel "Danny" Casolaro, who was investigating allegations surrounding the INSLAW affair and related claims of government misconduct. Casolaro reportedly believed that his research had uncovered information relevant to Morgan's death. Their contact occurred shortly before Casolaro traveled to Martinsburg, West Virginia, where he was found dead on August 10, 1991.

Beginning in 1990, Casolaro investigated a collection of alleged connections among political scandals, financial institutions, intelligence activities, and organized crime. He referred to the supposed network as "The Octopus". His investigation encompassed the INSLAW affair, the Iran–Contra affair, and the collapse of the Bank of Credit and Commerce International (BCCI).

Casolaro believed these events might be connected through a network involving financial interests, government officials, intelligence personnel, and criminal organizations. His proposed connections, including those involving Morgan's death, formed part of his investigative theory and were not established as a single coordinated conspiracy.

Casolaro reportedly discussed Morgan's case with Devereux and suggested that information uncovered during his investigation of the INSLAW affair and the PROMIS software controversy might be relevant. Accounts of their contact have also described Casolaro's interest in Morgan's alleged gold-related transactions. These claims have contributed to speculation that Morgan's death may have intersected with broader financial and political controversies, although the nature and significance of any such connection remain unverified.
