= 1980 October Surprise theory =

1980 US presidential election theory

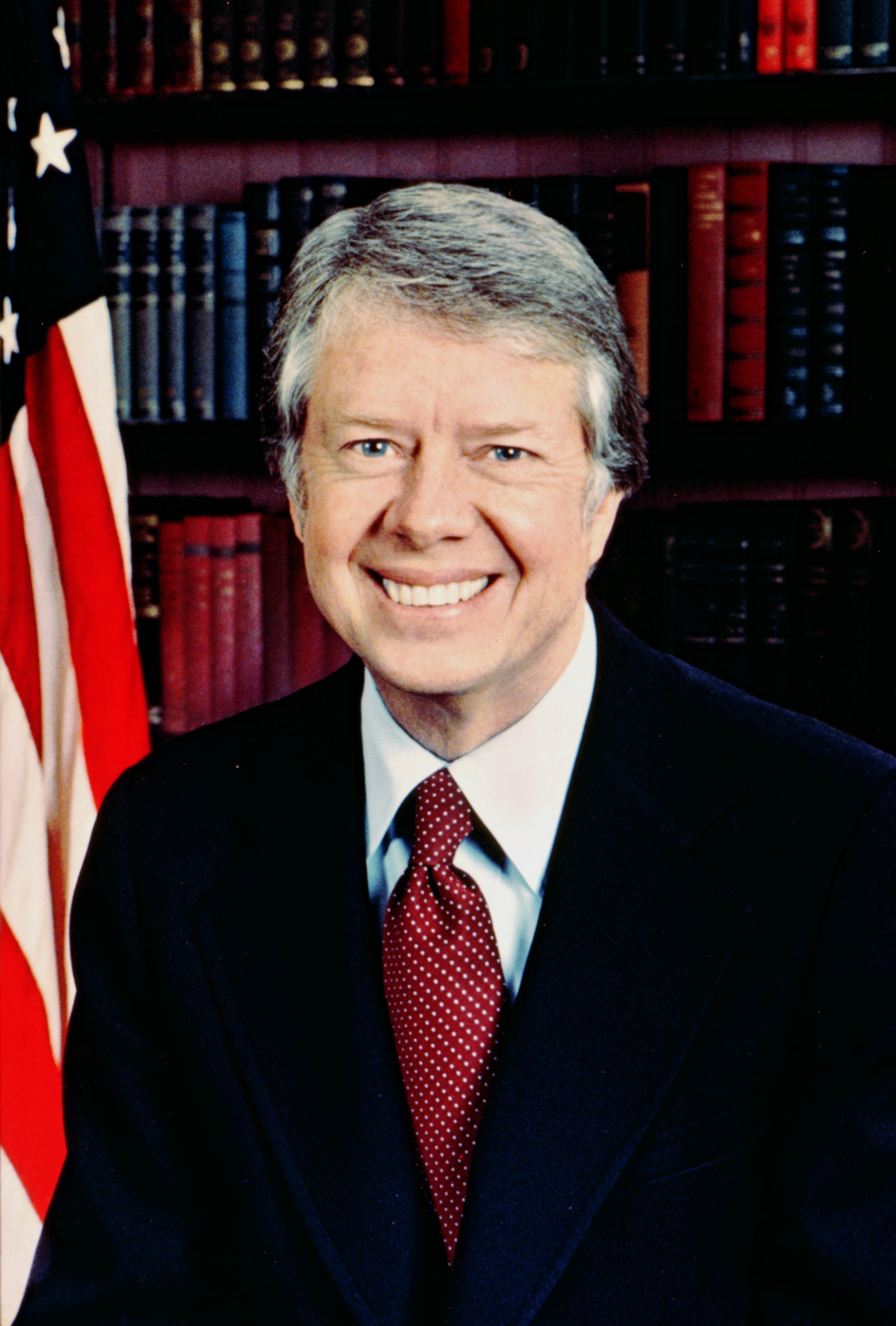
Jimmy Carter

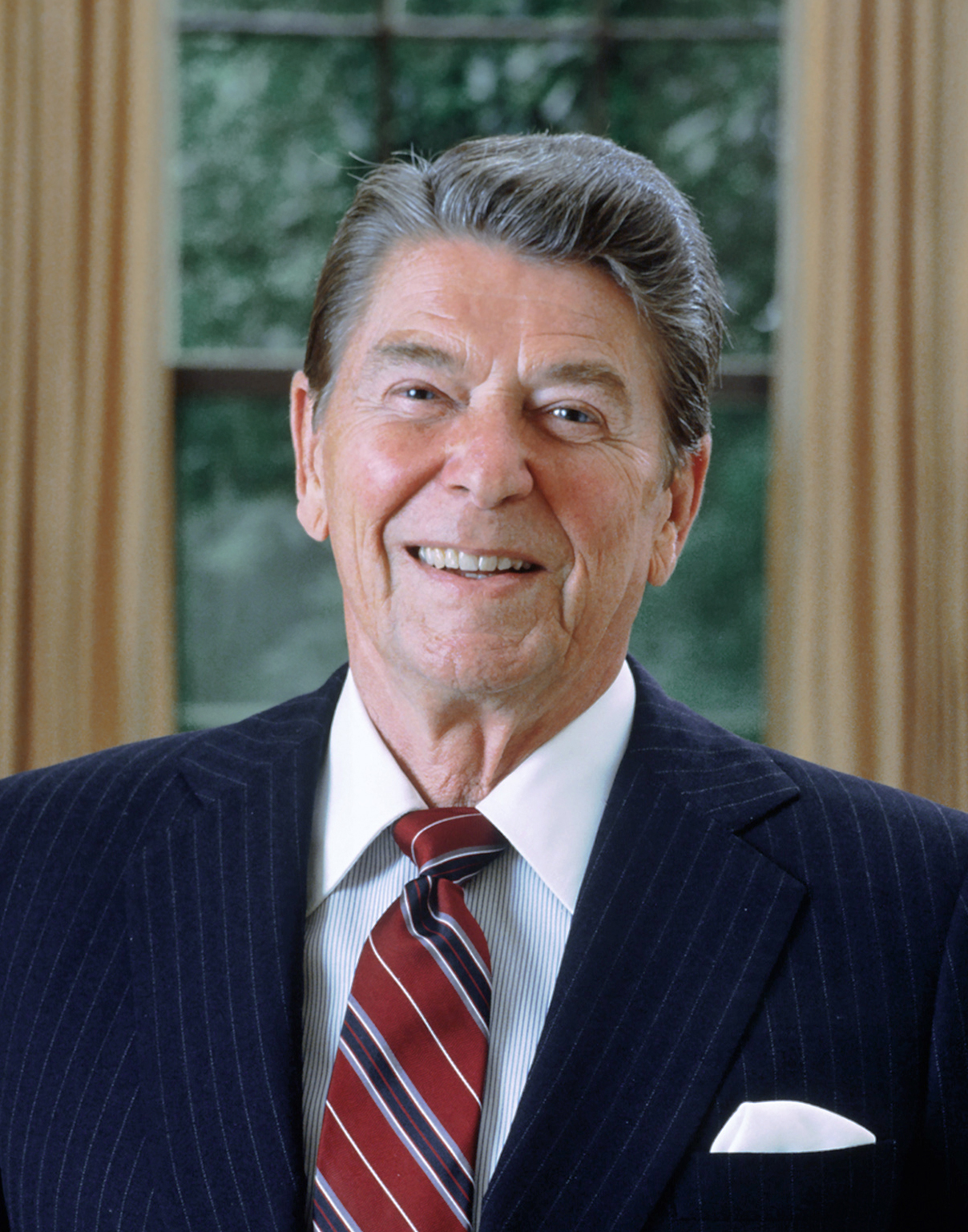
Ronald Reagan

The 1980 October Surprise theory refers to the claim that members of Ronald Reagan's presidential campaign covertly negotiated with Iranian leaders to undermine incumbent U.S. president Jimmy Carter by delaying the release of 66 American hostages detained in Iran. The hostage situation, which began when Iranian revolutionaries seized the U.S. embassy in Tehran, was one of the biggest news stories of 1980, and Carter's inability to resolve it is widely believed to have contributed to his loss. The remaining hostages were released minutes after Reagan was inaugurated as President.

After 12 years of varying media attention, both houses of the U.S. Congress held separate inquiries and concluded that credible evidence supporting the allegation was absent or insufficient. Nevertheless, several individuals—most notably, former Iranian President Abulhassan Banisadr, former Lieutenant Governor of Texas Ben Barnes, former naval intelligence officer and U.S. National Security Council member Gary Sick, and Barbara Honegger, a former campaign staffer and White House analyst for both Reagan and his successor George H. W. Bush—have stood by the allegation.

== Background ==
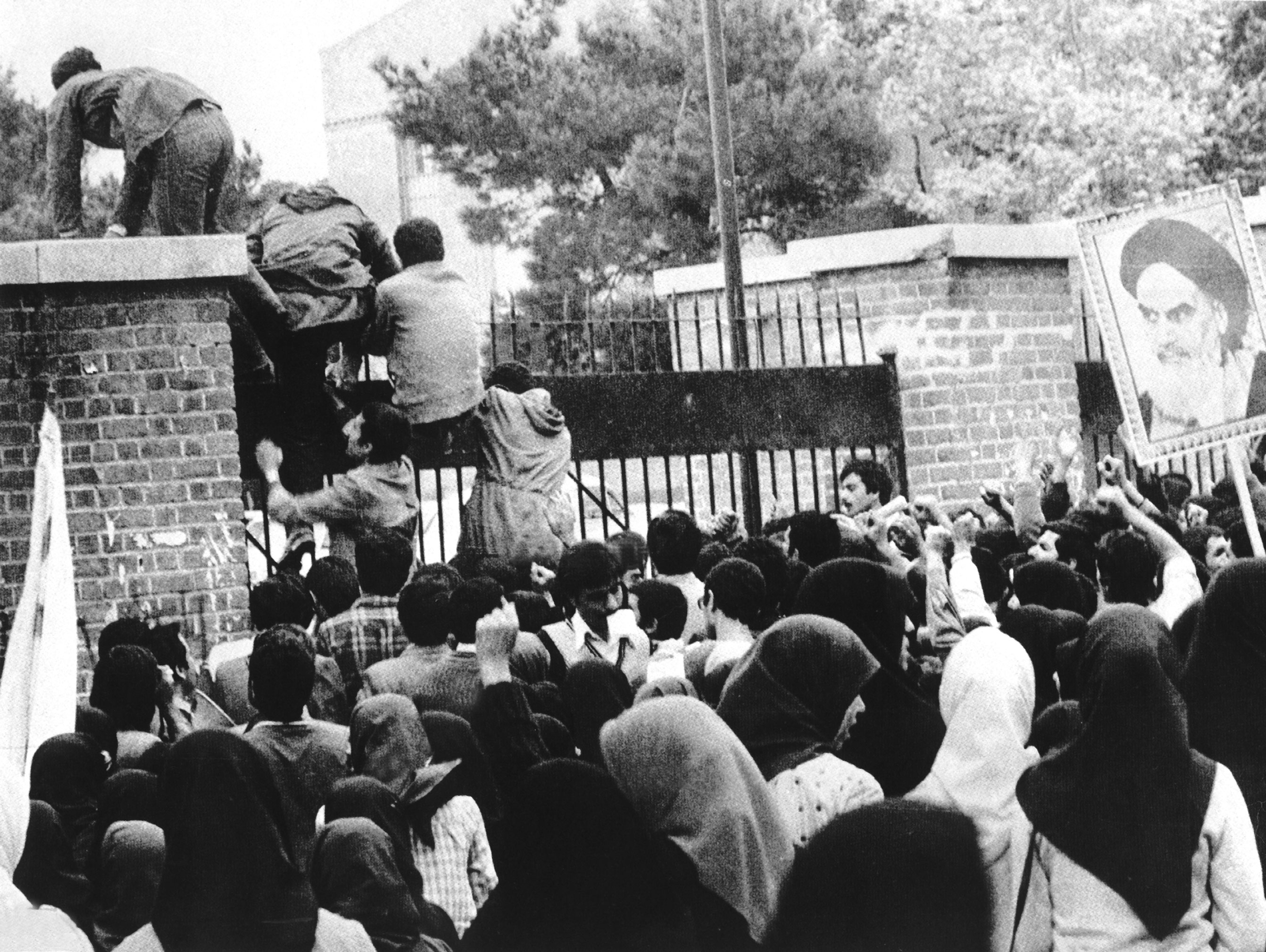
Iranian students storming the Embassy of the United States in Tehran on November 4, 1979

In November 1979, a number of U.S. hostages were captured in Iran during the Iranian Revolution. The Iran hostage crisis continued into 1980; as the November 1980 presidential election approached, there were concerns in the Republican Party that a resolution of the crisis could constitute an "October surprise" which might give incumbent Jimmy Carter enough of an electoral boost to be re-elected. After the release of the hostages on January 20, 1981, mere minutes after Republican challenger Ronald Reagan's inauguration, some charged that the Reagan campaign had made a secret deal with the Iranian government whereby the Iranians would hold the hostages until after Reagan was elected and inaugurated.

The issue of an "October Surprise" was brought up during an investigation by a House of Representatives Subcommittee into how the Reagan campaign obtained debate briefing materials of then-President Carter. During that investigation, sometimes referred to as Debategate, the Subcommittee on Human Resources of the House Post Office and Civil Service Committee obtained access to Reagan campaign documents. The documents included numerous references to a monitoring effort for any such October Surprise. The Subcommittee, chaired by former U.S. Representative Donald Albosta (D–MI), issued a comprehensive report on 17 May 1984, describing each type of information that was detected and its possible source. A section of the report was dedicated to the October Surprise issue.

== Origins ==
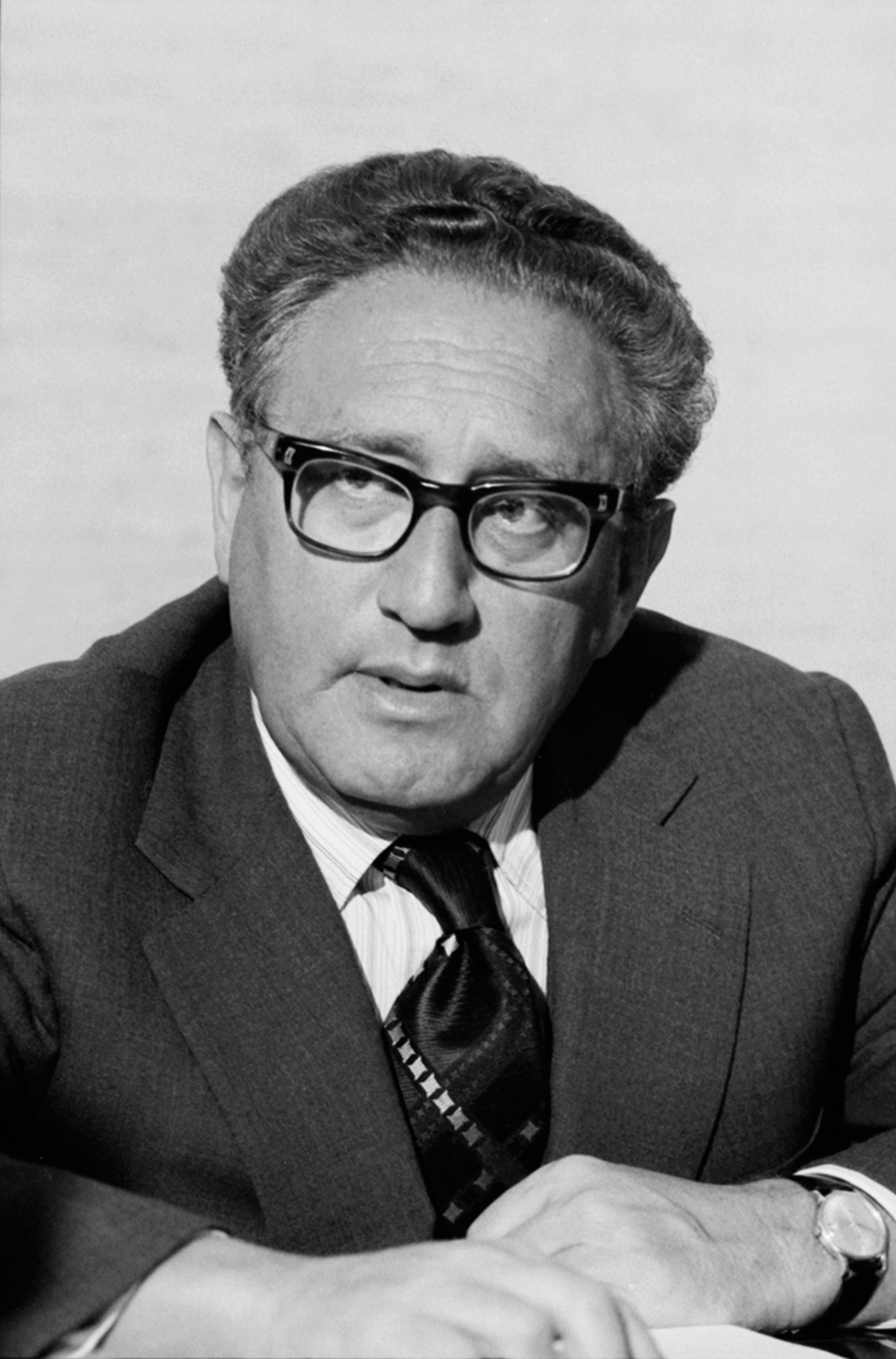
Henry Kissinger

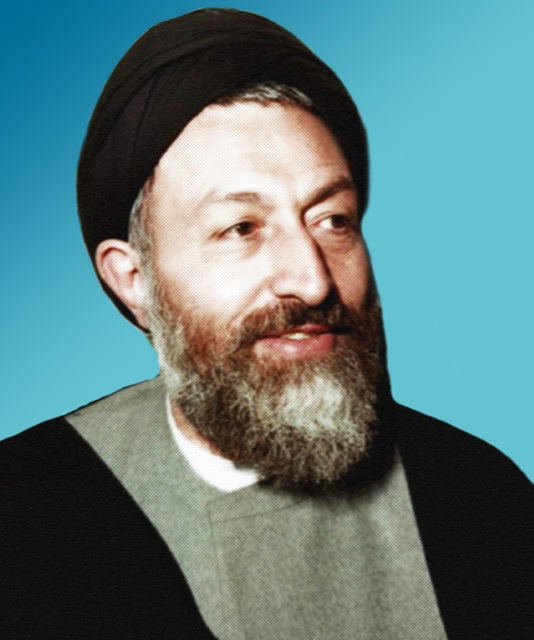
Mohammad Beheshti

The first printed instance of the October Surprise theory has been attributed to a story in the December 2, 1980, issue of Executive Intelligence Review, a periodical published by followers of Lyndon LaRouche, prior to the release of the hostages. Written by Robert Dreyfuss, the article cited "Iranian sources" in Paris as well as "Top level intelligence sources in Reagan's inner circle" as saying that Henry Kissinger met with representatives of Mohammad Beheshti during the week of November 12, 1980. The story claimed that "pro-Reagan British intelligence circles and the Kissinger faction" meeting with the Iranians six to eight weeks prior had interfered with "President Carter's efforts to secure an arms-for-hostage deal with Teheran". The LaRouche movement returned to the story in the September 2, 1983, issue of New Solidarity, stating "The deal ... fell through when the hard-line mullahs boycotted the Majlis in late October."

The theory garnered little attention until news of the Iran–Contra affair broke in November 1986. John M. Barry of Newsweek has said that Iran–Contra "created fertile ground for the October Surprise theory". Scott D'Amico in Conspiracies and Conspiracy Theories in American History wrote that "[t]he arms-deal arrangement provided credence to those who believed Reagan was fulfilling his end of the October surprise pact with Khomeni." In the November 24, 1986, issue of The New York Times, William Safire charged:

"The geopolitical excuse offered now – that the ransom was a plan to influence post-Khomeini Iran – is a feeble cover-up. Robert McFarlane first approached the Reagan campaign in the summer of 1980 with an Iranian in tow who proposed to deliver our hostages to Mr. Reagan rather than President Carter, thereby swinging the U.S. election. The Reagan representatives properly recoiled, but Mr. McFarlane has had Iranian held hostages on the brain ever since."

Electoral College results in the 1980 U.S. presidential election

Safire's piece was based upon information he solicited from Laurence Silberman in 1984 regarding a brief meeting four years earlier between Silberman, McFarlane, and Richard V. Allen with a Malaysian man who proposed a plan to contact someone who could influence Iran to delay the release of the hostages in order to embarrass the Carter administration. Silberman later wrote: "Ironically, it was I who unwittingly initiated the so-called 'October Surprise' story, which grew into an utterly fantastic tale".

An article by Bob Woodward and Walter Pincus a few days later in the November 29, 1986 The Washington Post said that United States officials tied to Reagan, well before the Iran Contra affair, considered an initiative to sell US-made military parts to Iran in exchange for the hostage held there. The House October Surprise Task Force credited the Woodward/Pincus article as raising "claims that would become keystones in the October Surprise theory".

The Miami Herald published an article by Alfonso Chardy on April 12, 1987, that McFarlane, Silberman, and Allen had met with a man claiming to represent the Iranian government and offering the release of the hostages. Chardy's article also quoted exiled former Iranian president Abolhassan Banisadr who said he had learned that Beheshti and Akbar Hashemi Rafsanjani were involved in negotiations with the Reagan campaign to delay the release of the hostages until Reagan became president.

== Chronology ==
The House October Surprise Task Force, commenced in 1992, outlined as "principal allegations" three supposed meetings between representatives of Reagan's campaign and Iranian government officials in the summer and fall of 1980 to delay the release of the hostages: 1) a meeting in Madrid during the summer; 2) a meeting at the L'Enfant Plaza Hotel in Washington, D.C., that autumn; and 3) a meeting in Paris in October. The Task Force characterized three other alleged meetings or contacts as "ancillary allegations": 1) a meeting at the Mayflower Hotel in Washington, D.C., in early spring 1980; 2) a meeting at the Churchill Hotel in London in the summer of 1980; and 3) a meeting at The Sherry-Netherland hotel in New York City in January 1981.

=== Early 1980 ===
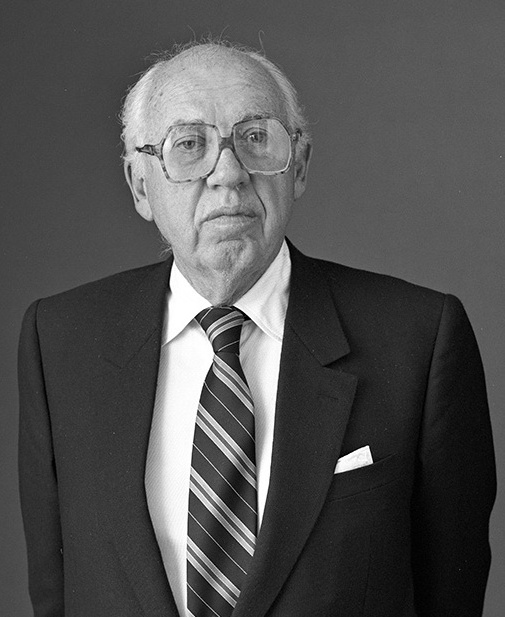
William Casey

Jamshid Hashemi told Gary Sick he was visited by campaign manager William Casey and Roy Furmark while staying at the Mayflower Hotel in Washington, D.C., in March 1980. Hashemi claimed Casey was aware of his contacts in Iran and wanted to discuss the American hostages held there. He told Sick that he then reported the meeting to his "intelligence contact" Charles Cogan, then a senior official within the CIA's Directorate of Operations. Hashemi later testified that he was alone with Casey and denied telling Sick that Furmark was present, and that the meeting with Casey occurred in July 1980. The House October Surprise Task Force concluded that there was no credible evidence to support the allegations. The Task Force said that Hashemi was the only source of the story, that he provided no evidence to substantiate the allegations, that there were major inconsistencies in his story to different parties, and that there was credible documentary and testimonial evidence inconsistent with his allegations.

In an October 1990 interview, Jamshid Hashemi told Gary Sick he was introduced to Donald Gregg, a U.S. National Security Council aide with connections to George H. W. Bush, at Cyrus Hashemi's office in New York City in the Spring of 1980. Jamshid told Sick that he and Cyrus had lunch with Gregg at a restaurant near Cyrus' office where they discussed the contacts that were underway between the brothers and the U.S. Government. The House October Surprise Task Force said that they found no credible evidence that Gregg met with the Hashemis, and noted that Jamshid recanted the allegation in testimony stating he had never met with Gregg. After Jamshid's testimony denying that he told Sick that he met with Gregg, he told Sick that the person he met with was actually Robert Gray. The Task Force concluded that Jamshid's "recent statements about this matter as totally devoid of credibility and probative of a tendency to modify his allegations to conform to subsequent revelations which are inconsistent with those allegations".

=== Mid-1980 ===
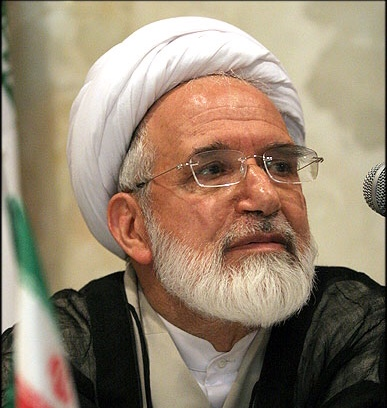
Mehdi Karroubi

Jamshid Hashemi was also the principal source for allegations that an American delegation consisting of William Casey, Donald Gregg, and another unidentified American met with Iranian officials Mehdi Karroubi and his brother Hassan Karrubi at the Hotel Ritz in Madrid. first in July 1980 then again the following month. Jamshid claimed he and Cyrus Hashemi attended the meetings to provide translation services between the two parties. According to Jamshid, Casey promised that in exchange for the hostages the new Reagan Administration would return all of Iranian's frozen assets and military equipment that had been withheld by Carter. Jamshid said Casey instructed the Iranians to hold the hostages until after the election. According to Jamshid, the meetings ended when Karrubi said he did not have the authority to make that commitment but would return to Tehran and seeking instructions from Ayatollah Khomeini. The Task Force said they "determined that Jamshid's allegations regarding meetings in Madrid in the summer of 1980 are fabrications" and that there was no credible evidence to support them.

Jamshid Hashemi alleged that Karrubi met again with Casey in Madrid on about August 12, 1980, saying Khomeini had agreed to the proposal, and that Casey agreed the next day, naming Cyrus Hashimi as middleman to handle the arms transactions. Hashemi also alleged that more meetings were set for October. The House October Surprise Task Force concluded that these allegations were not credible. Cyrus purchased a Greek ship and commences arms deliveries valued at $150 million from the Israeli port of Eilat to Bandar Abbas. According to CIA sources, Hashimi receives a $7 million commission.

=== Late 1980 ===
On September 22, 1980, Iraq invaded Iran.

An expatriate Iranian arms dealer named Hushang Lavi claims that in late September 1980, he met with Richard Allen, Robert McFarlane, and Lawrence Silberman, and discussed the possible exchange of F-4 parts for American hostages, but Lavi says they asserted they "were already in touch with the Iranians themselves".

On October 15 to 20, meetings were held in Paris between emissaries of the Reagan-Bush campaign, with Casey as "key participant", and "high-level Iranian and Israeli representatives". On October 21, Iran, for reasons not explained, abruptly shifted its position in secret negotiations with the Carter administration, and disclaimed "further interest in receiving military equipment".

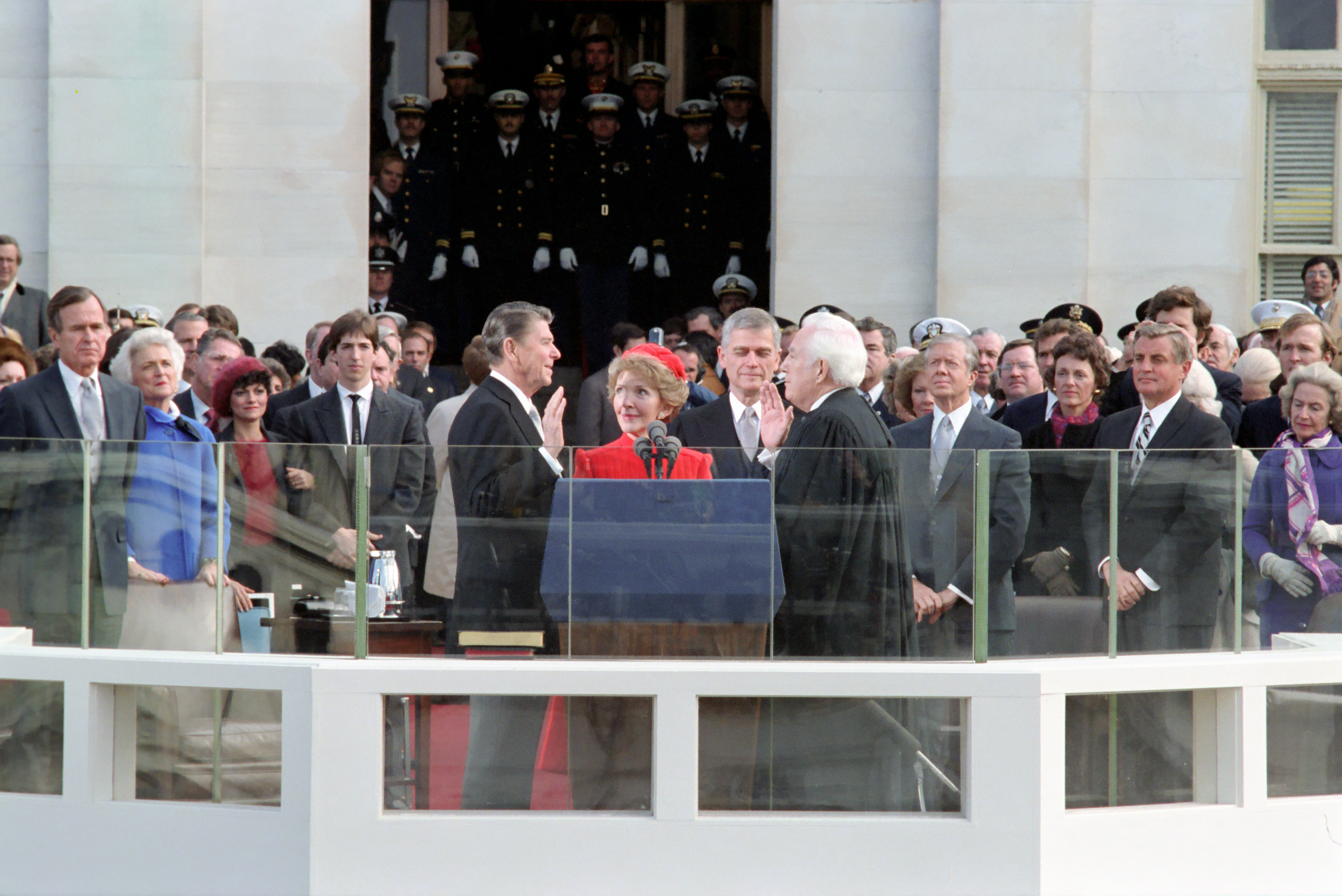
Reagan being sworn in as President during his 1981 inauguration

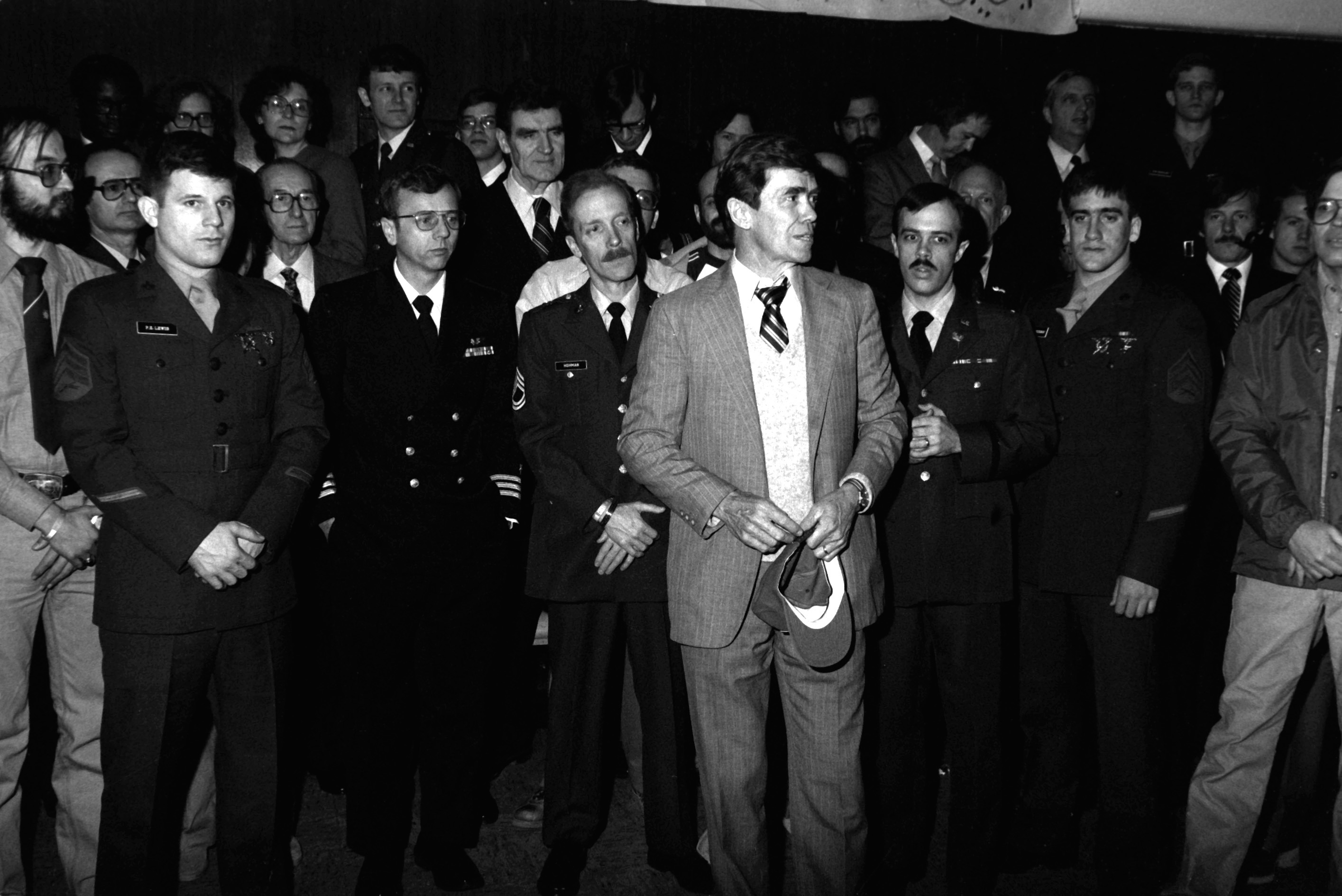
Group photograph of the 52 final hostages after they were released

On October 21 to 23, Israel secretly shipped F-4 fighter-aircraft tires to Iran, in violation of the U.S. arms embargo, and Iran dispersed the hostages to different locations.

On January 20, 1981, the hostages were formally released into United States custody after spending 444 days in captivity. The release takes place just minutes after Ronald Reagan is sworn in as president.

== Investigations ==
=== Gary Sick ===
External videos
- Booknotes interview with Gary Sick on October Surprise, December 1, 1991, C-SPAN

The October Surprise allegations gained traction in the mainstream media after an editorial column by Gary Sick was published in The New York Times on April 15, 1991. Sick, who had served as President Carter's Iranian expert on the National Security Council, wrote: "I have been told repeatedly that individuals associated with the Reagan-Bush campaign of 1980 met secretly with Iranian officials to delay the release of the American hostages until after the presidential election. For this favor, Iran was rewarded with a substantial supply of arms from Israel." Sick wrote that members of the Reagan-Bush campaign had met with high-level representatives of Iran and Israel in a series of meeting in Paris between October 15–20, 1980, and that there were 15 sources who had direct or indirect knowledge of the event.

Sick later published a book on the subject in 1991, October Surprise: America's Hostages in Iran and the Election of Ronald Reagan. Sick's credibility was boosted by the fact that he was a retired naval captain, served on Ford's, Carter's, and Reagan's National Security Council, and held high positions with many prominent organizations. Sick wrote that in October 1980, officials in Reagan's campaign, including William Casey, made a secret deal with Iran to delay the release of the American hostages until after the election; in return for this, the U.S. purportedly arranged for Israel to ship weapons to Iran.

Sick admitted that "The story is tangled and murky, and it may never be fully unraveled." He was unable to prove his claims, including that, in the days before the presidential election with daily press pools surrounding him and a public travel schedule, vice presidential candidate George H. W. Bush secretly left the country and met with Iranian officials in France to discuss the fate of the hostages.

=== Frontline / Robert Parry ===
External videos
- FRONTLINE (S09E08) The Election Held Hostage, April 16, 1991, Frontline

Sick's editorial in The New York Times directed readers to watch the investigative documentary program Frontline the following evening to view interviews of his sources. In the Frontline episode released on April 16, 1991, Robert Parry "investigate[d] startling new evidence about how both the Carter and Reagan camps may have tried to forge secret deals for [the Iranian] hostages during the 1980 presidential campaign." The program presented allegations 1) that Cyrus Hashemi and William Casey met in Madrid to delay the release of the hostages, 2) that there was a meeting in Paris to finalize the deal, and 3) that there were shipments of American-made arms from Israel to Iran.

In a second episode released on April 7, 1992, Parry "investigate[d] whether or not William Casey, Reagan's campaign director, could have met with Iranians in Paris and Madrid in the summer of 1980." This program discussed the alleged whereabouts of Casey and Mehdi Karroubi, the credibility of witnesses to the meetings, and other theories about the alleged evidence.

=== Danny Casolaro ===
In August 1991, freelance writer Danny Casolaro (among others) claimed to be almost ready to expose the alleged October surprise conspiracy, when he suddenly died a violent death in a hotel bathtub in Martinsburg, West Virginia, raising suspicions. He appeared to be traveling on leads for his investigation into the Inslaw Affair. His death was ruled a suicide. The case was the subject of a 2024 Netflix docuseries titled American Conspiracy: The Octopus Murders.

=== Newsweek ===
Newsweek magazine also ran an investigation, reporting in November 1991 that most, if not all, of the charges made were groundless. Specifically, Newsweek found little evidence that the United States had transferred arms to Iran prior to the Iran-Contra scandal, and was able to account for William Casey's whereabouts when he was allegedly at the Madrid meeting, saying that he was at a conference in London. Newsweek also alleged that the story was being heavily pushed within the LaRouche Movement.

=== The New Republic ===
Steven Emerson and Jesse Furman of The New Republic also looked into the allegations and reported, in November 1991, that "the conspiracy as currently postulated is a total fabrication". They were unable to verify any of the evidence presented by Sick and supporters, finding them to be inconsistent and contradictory in nature. They also pointed out that nearly every witness of Sick's had either been indicted or was under investigation by the Department of Justice. Like the Newsweek investigation, they had also debunked the claims of Reagan election campaign officials being in Paris during the timeframe that Sick specified, contradicting Sick's sources.

In May 2023, Sick, former Carter administration Chief Domestic Policy Advisor Stuart E. Eizenstat, author Kai Bird, and journalist Jonathan Alter published an article in The New Republic outlining the various allegations and circumstantial evidence (including Barnes' allegations) that have emerged in the decades following the earlier investigations, declaring the credibility of the theory to be "all but settled".

=== The Village Voice ===
Retired CIA analyst and counter-intelligence officer Frank Snepp of The Village Voice reviewed Sick's allegations, publishing an article in February 1992. Snepp alleged that Sick had only interviewed half of the sources used in his book, and supposedly relied on hearsay from unreliable sources for large amounts of critical material. Snepp also discovered that Sick had sold the rights to his book to Oliver Stone in 1989. After going through evidence presented by Richard Brenneke, Snepp asserted that Brenneke's credit card receipts showed him to be in Portland, Oregon, during the time he claimed to be in Paris observing the secret meeting.

=== Senate investigation ===
The U.S. Senate's November 1992 report concluded that "by any standard, the credible evidence now known falls far short of supporting the allegation of an agreement between the Reagan campaign and Iran to delay the release of the hostages."

=== House of Representatives investigation ===
The House of Representatives' January 1993 report concluded "there is no credible evidence supporting any attempt by the Reagan presidential campaign—or persons associated with the campaign—to delay the release of the American hostages in Iran". The task force Chairman Lee H. Hamilton (D-Indiana) also added that the vast majority of the sources and material reviewed by the committee were "wholesale fabricators or were impeached by documentary evidence". The report also expressed the belief that several witnesses had committed perjury during their sworn statements to the committee, among them Richard Brenneke, who claimed to be a CIA agent.

=== Craig Unger ===
Craig Unger set out to prove that the October Surprise theory really happened. In 2024, he culminated more than thirty years of investigation by publishing Den of Spies: Reagan, Carter, and the Secret History of the Treason That Stole the White House. Writing about the book, The Atlantic observed, “the once-debunked October surprise has shifted over the same decades into the realm of high plausibility (though nothing close to agreed-upon history).” Unger criticizes the investigation of the House October Surprise Task Force, describing what he says is "the mountain of evidence that had been discounted, ignored, or outright dismissed". The review in The Guardian highlights Unger's assertion that “in 1980 when the Republicans weren't even in power, ... they were secretly sending weapons to Iran through Israel.”

== Allegations ==
=== Former Iranian President Banisadr ===
It is now very clear that there were two separate agreements, one the official agreement with Carter in Algeria, the other, a secret agreement with another party, which, it is now apparent, was Reagan. They made a deal with Reagan that the hostages should not be released until after Reagan became president. So, then in return, Reagan would give them arms. We have published documents which show that US arms were shipped, via Israel, in March, about 2 months after Reagan became president.

— Former Iranian President Abolhassan Banisadr

This accusation was made in Banisadr's 1989 memoir, which also claimed that Henry Kissinger plotted to set up a Palestinian state in the Iranian province of Khuzestan and that Zbigniew Brzezinski conspired with Saddam Hussein to plot Iraq's 1980 invasion of Iran. Foreign Affairs described the book as "a rambling, self-serving series of reminiscences" and "long on sensational allegations and devoid of documentation that might lend credence to Bani-Sadr's claims".

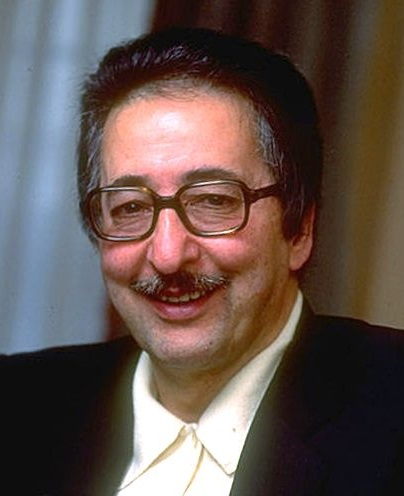
Abolhassan Banisadr

Writing again in 2013 in The Christian Science Monitor, Banisadr reiterated and elaborated on his earlier statements:

I was deposed in June 1981 as a result of a coup against me. After arriving in France, I told a BBC reporter that I had left Iran to expose the symbiotic relationship between Khomeinism and Reaganism. Ayatollah Khomeini and Ronald Reagan had organized a clandestine negotiation, later known as the "October Surprise", which prevented the attempts by myself and [Carter] to free the hostages before the 1980 US presidential election took place. The fact that they were not released tipped the results of the election in favor of Reagan.

Two of my advisors, Hussein Navab Safavi and Sadr-al-Hefazi, were executed by Khomeini's regime because they had become aware of this secret relationship between Khomeini, his son Ahmad, the Islamic Republican Party, and the Reagan administration.

=== French intelligence chief de Marenches ===
In 1980, Alexandre de Marenches was head of France's external intelligence agency, the Service de documentation extérieure et de contre-espionnage (SDECE). Journalist David Andelman, who co-wrote de Marenches's memoirs, said that de Marenches told him off the record during ninety hours of interviews from 1988 to 1991 that he had been involved in "setting up a meeting in Paris between Casey and some Iranians in late October of 1980". De Marenches told the October Surprise Task Force in 1992 that he had no involvement in setting up a meeting in Paris.

=== Israeli Prime Minister Shamir ===
In 1993, former Israeli Prime Minister Yitzhak Shamir, who had served as Israel's foreign minister in 1980, was interviewed by several reporters. During the interview, Shamir was asked whether the October Surprise had occurred and replied: "Of course it was". When pressed for details, he said, "I know in America, they know it", but declined to elaborate further.

=== Reagan campaign staffer Barbara Honegger ===
Barbara Honegger was a campaign staffer and policy analyst for Reagan who resigned her post as a special assistant in the United States Department of Justice Civil Rights Division in 1983 after publicly criticizing what she claimed was the administration's lack of commitment to gender equality. She claims that while working for Reagan she discovered information that made her believe that George H. W. Bush and William Casey had conspired to assure that Iran would not free the U.S. hostages until Jimmy Carter had been defeated in the 1980 presidential election, and she alleges that arms sales to Iran were a part of that bargain. In 1987, in the context of the Iran–Contra investigations, Honegger was reported as saying that shortly after October 22, 1980, when Iran abruptly changed the terms of its deal with Carter, a member of the Reagan campaign told her "We don't have to worry about an 'October surprise.' Dick cut a deal," with "Dick" referring to Richard Allen.

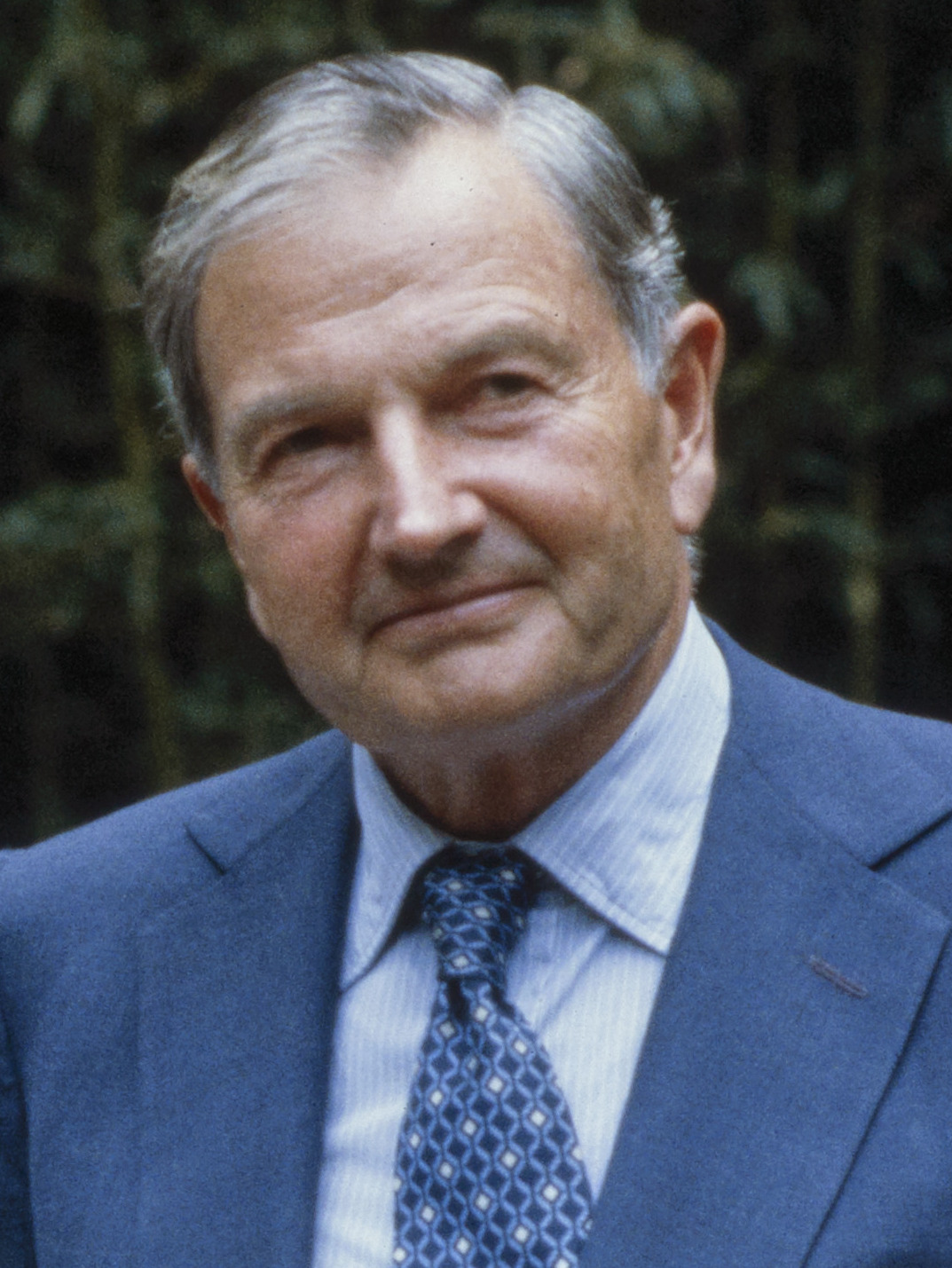
David Rockefeller

=== Chase Bank revelations ===
In a memoir by Joseph V. Reed Jr., he wrote that a "team" around David Rockefeller "collaborated closely with the Reagan campaign in its efforts to pre-empt and discourage what it derisively labeled an "October surprise" — a pre-election release of the American hostages, the papers show. The Chase team helped the Reagan campaign gather and spread rumors about possible payoffs to win the release, a propaganda effort that Carter administration officials have said impeded talks to free the captives."

=== Madrid embassy cable ===
In 2011, a 1991 memo by associate White House counsel Chester Paul Beach was found among records at the George H. W. Bush Presidential Library. The memo recorded a conversation with State Department legal adviser Edwin Williamson, who said that officials had found "a cable from the Madrid embassy indicating that Bill Casey was in town, for purposes unknown." The memo concerned the collection by the Bush Administration of relevant State Department documents for the House investigation into the October Surprise. The cable was not provided to the House investigation.

=== PLO chairman Yasser Arafat ===
In 1996, former President Jimmy Carter met with PLO chairman Yasser Arafat in the Gaza Strip. During the 1980 Iran hostage crisis, Arafat had close relations with Iran's revolutionary government. According to historian Douglas Brinkley, who witnessed the exchange, Arafat told Carter that in 1980 "the Republicans approached me with an arms deal if I could arrange to keep the hostages in Iran until after the election" and that he had turned them down. Arafat's adviser Bassam Abu Sharif separately reported that a friend of the Reagan campaign had "said he wanted the PLO to use its influence to delay the release of the American hostages."

=== Ben Barnes ===
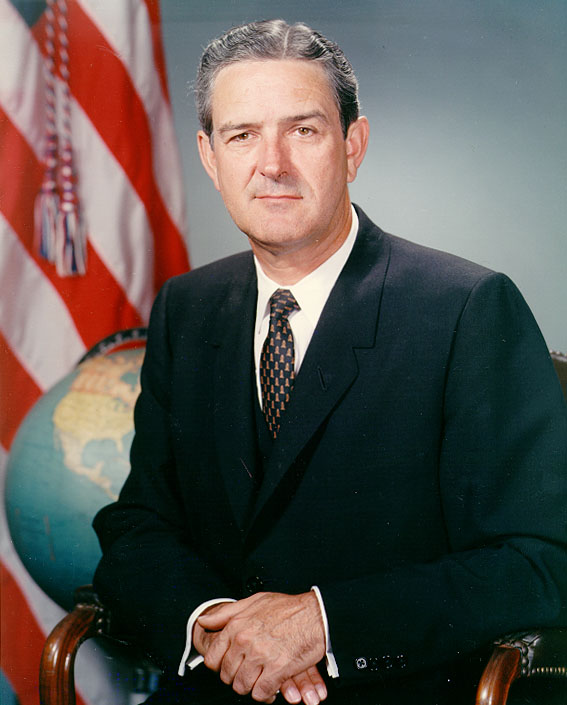
John Connally

In March 2023, Peter Baker reported in The New York Times that former Texas governor John Connally, who had sought the Republican presidential nomination in 1980, travelled to several Arab countries and Israel between July 1980 and August 1980. According to Connally's close associate Ben Barnes, who accompanied him on the trip, Connally told the Arab officials whom he spoke with to relay a message to Iran to the effect that "Ronald Reagan's going to be elected president and you need to get the word to Iran that they're going to make a better deal with Reagan than they are Carter." Barnes also recounted accompanying Connally to a September 1980 meeting in Houston in which Connally briefed Casey, Reagan's campaign manager and a central figure in many versions of the "October Surprise" theory, on the outcome of the trip, with Casey specifically asking if "[the Iranians] were going to hold the hostages."

While there is documentation that this trip to the Middle East occurred and that Connally communicated with close Reagan associates during the trip, Baker states that there are "no diaries or memos to corroborate" Barnes's recollection of what, specifically, Connally told the Arab officials. Additionally, Barnes's account does not confirm that the Reagan campaign reached an arms-for-hostages agreement with Iran prior to the outcome of the 1980 election, or other theories advanced prior to congressional investigations thirty years ago. Connally's trip was not investigated by the congressional "October Surprise" committees, but Barnes's anecdote about Connally had been previously published in H. W. Brands's 2015 biography of Reagan, albeit "generat[ing] little public notice at the time" according to Baker. Barnes acknowledged not being in a position to assess personal involvement by Reagan himself or the effect (if any) that Connally's overture may have had on Iranian actions.

=== Duane "Dewey" Clarridge ===
Shortly after the death of Duane Clarridge in April 2016, Newsweek published an article by Nicholas Schou claiming that the former CIA operations officer and Iran–Contra figure had previously told him that the October Surprise conspiracy as depicted in George Cave's novel, October 1980, was "really true". Schou noted that Cave denied actually believing that officials working on behalf of Reagan plotted to delay the release of the hostages.

=== Declassified 1980 CIA memo ===
In 2017, a declassified CIA 1980 memo was released in which the agency concluded "Iranian hardliners – especially Ayatollah Khomeini" were "determined to exploit the hostage issue to bring about President Carter's defeat in the November elections." MuckRock, a press organization specialized in Freedom of Information Act requests, argued that "While the document doesn't prove the Reagan campaign intended to collude with Iran, it does document Iran's motives and matches the October Surprise narrative outlined by former CIA officers George Cave and Duane 'Dewey' Clarridge."

=== Michael Riconosciuto ===
In context of his involvement in the Inslaw affair, Michael Riconosciuto claimed that Reagan associate Earl Brian worked on an agreement with the Iranian government to delay the release of the hostages, and that the software was stolen in order to raise funds for Brian's payment.

=== Kevin Phillips ===
Political historian Kevin Phillips has been a proponent of the idea. In his 2004 book American Dynasty, although Phillips concedes that many of the specific allegations were proven false, he also argues that in his opinion, Reagan campaign officials "probably" were involved in a scheme "akin to" the specific scheme alleged by Sick.

== See also ==
- Iran–Contra affair
- Jimmy Carter's engagement with Ruhollah Khomeini
