= Danny Casolaro =

American writer (1947–1991)

- Born: Joseph Daniel Casolaro; June 16, 1947; Fort Meade, Maryland
- Died: August 10, 1991 (aged 44); Room 517, Sheraton Hotel, Martinsburg, West Virginia
- Cause of death: Exsanguination (ruled suicide, suspected homicide)
- Education: Providence College
- Occupations: Writer, magazine publisher
- Spouse: Terrill Pace (divorced)
- Children: 1

Joseph Daniel Casolaro (June 16, 1947 – August 10, 1991) was an American freelance writer who investigated the Inslaw case and a series of alleged connections that he called "the Octopus". He was found dead in a hotel room in Martinsburg, West Virginia, in August 1991. His death was ruled a suicide.

Casolaro believed that the Inslaw dispute was connected to several political and financial controversies, including the Iran–Contra affair, the 1980 October Surprise theory, and the collapse of the Bank of Credit and Commerce International. He referred to the alleged network connecting these events as "the Octopus".

Casolaro's family claimed that he was murdered. They state that before he left for Martinsburg he told his brother that he had been receiving harassing phone calls late at night, that some of them were threatening, and that if something were to happen to him while in Martinsburg it would not be an accident. They also cited his well-known squeamishness and fear of blood tests, and stated they found it incomprehensible that if he were going to kill himself, he would do so by cutting his wrists a dozen times. A number of law-enforcement officials also argued that his death deserved further scrutiny, and his notes were passed by his family to ABC News and Time magazine, both of which investigated the case, but no evidence of murder was ever found.

== Early life and career ==
Casolaro was born into a Catholic family and grew up in McLean, Virginia, the son of an obstetrician and the second of six children. One of his siblings fell ill and died shortly after birth. A younger sister, Lisa, died of a drug overdose in San Francisco's Haight-Ashbury in 1971. Casolaro attended Providence College until 1968. He married Terrill Pace, a former Miss Virginia. The couple had a son, Trey, and divorced after ten years, with Casolaro granted legal custody of his son.

Casolaro's interests included amateur boxing, writing poems and short stories, and raising purebred Arabian horses. He also dabbled in journalism, looking into issues such as the Soviet naval presence in Cuba, the Castro intelligence network, and Chinese communist smuggling of opium into the U.S. according to his own curriculum vitae (though it remains unclear how much he had published). At the time of his death, he had written and published one novel, The Ice King, with Whitmore Publishing Co.

Toward the end of the 1970s, he dropped his interest in journalism and acquired a series of computer-industry trade publications, which he began selling towards the end of the 1980s. In early 1990, he decided to take up journalism again and, soon after, took an interest in the Inslaw case, of which his IT contacts had made him aware.

== Research ==
Shortly before his death, Casolaro told people that he was nearly ready to reveal a wide-ranging conspiracy involving the Inslaw case, Iran-Contra, the alleged October Surprise conspiracy, and the closure of the Bank of Credit and Commerce International (BCCI) being related to the Central Intelligence Agency. David Corn writes in The Nation that the papers Casolaro left behind reveal few clues, except that he was in over his head, but was tenacious.

His papers included old clippings, handwritten notes that were hard to read, and the names of former CIA officers and arms dealers. Corn writes that the notes show Casolaro was influenced by the Christic Institute and that he had pursued material fed to him by a reporter who worked for Lyndon LaRouche. Richard Fricker writes in Wired that Casolaro had been led into a "Bermuda Triangle of spooks, guns, drugs and organized crime."

== Inslaw case ==
Ron Rosenbaum writes that the Inslaw story alone is enough to drive a sane man to madness. "If they ever make a movie of the Inslaw suit," he writes, "it could be called Mr. and Mrs. Smith Go to Washington and Meet Franz Kafka." Inslaw's founder, William A. Hamilton, in a previous position with the U.S. Justice Department, had helped develop a program called PROMIS, short for Prosecutor's Management Information System. PROMIS was designed to organize the paperwork generated by law enforcement and the courts. After he left the Justice Department, Hamilton alleged that the government had stolen PROMIS and had distributed it illegally, robbing him of millions of dollars. The department denied this, insisting that they owned it because Hamilton had developed it while working for them. As a result of this dispute, Hamilton and the department had been in litigation since 1983. A federal bankruptcy judge ruled in 1988 that the department had indeed taken the software by "trickery, fraud, and deceit", a decision upheld by a federal district court in 1988, but overturned on appeal in 1991.

A theory was developed around the case, with allegations that "back doors" had been inserted into the software so that whoever bought a copy of it from the Justice Department could be spied upon. The major source on the theory, both for Hamilton and, later, for Casolaro, was Michael Riconosciuto, described by Rosenbaum as a "rogue scientist/weapons designer/platinum miner/alleged crystal-meth manufacturer". Riconosciuto had been introduced to a friend of Casolaro's by Jeff Steinberg, a longtime top aide in the LaRouche organization.

Riconosciuto told Bill Hamilton that he and Earl Brian, a director of Hadron, Inc., a government consulting firm, had paid $40 million to Iranian officials in 1980 to persuade them not to release the American hostages before the conclusion of the presidential election that saw Ronald Reagan elected president of the United States; this is the claim now known as the "October Surprise". In exchange for his helping the Reagan administration, Brian was allegedly allowed to profit from the illegal distribution of the PROMIS system, according to Riconosciuto. Brian, who was a close friend of then-Attorney General Ed Meese and had worked for Reagan when he was governor of California, denied any involvement in either October Surprise or the Inslaw case.

In addition to this allegation, Riconosciuto claimed in a March 21, 1991, affidavit submitted to the court in the Inslaw case that he had modified Inslaw's software at the Justice Department's behest so that it could be sold to dozens of foreign governments with a secret "back door", allowing outsiders to access computer systems using PROMIS. These modifications allegedly took place at the Cabazon Indian Reservation near Indio, California. Because the reservation was sovereign territory where enforcement of U.S. law was sometimes problematic, Riconosciuto further claimed that he had worked on weapons programs there for the Wackenhut Corporation, such as a powerful "fuel air explosive". On March 29, 1991, eight days after submitting the affidavit, Riconosciuto was arrested for, and later convicted of, distributing methamphetamine and methadone, charges that he said were a set-up to keep him from telling his story.

In the summer of 1990, Casolaro arranged to meet Bill Hamilton, expressing an interest in pursuing the Inslaw story. Hamilton gave Casolaro a 12-page memo Riconosciuto had written detailing his allegations. Rosenbaum writes that, "The moment he got his hands on that maddening memo, with its maze of illusion and reality, was the moment Danny's life changed and he began his descent into the obsession that would lead to his death. He was slowly, then rapidly, sucked into a kind of covert-ops version of Dungeons & Dragons, with that memo as his guide and Michael Riconosciuto as his Dungeon Master."

== Final days ==
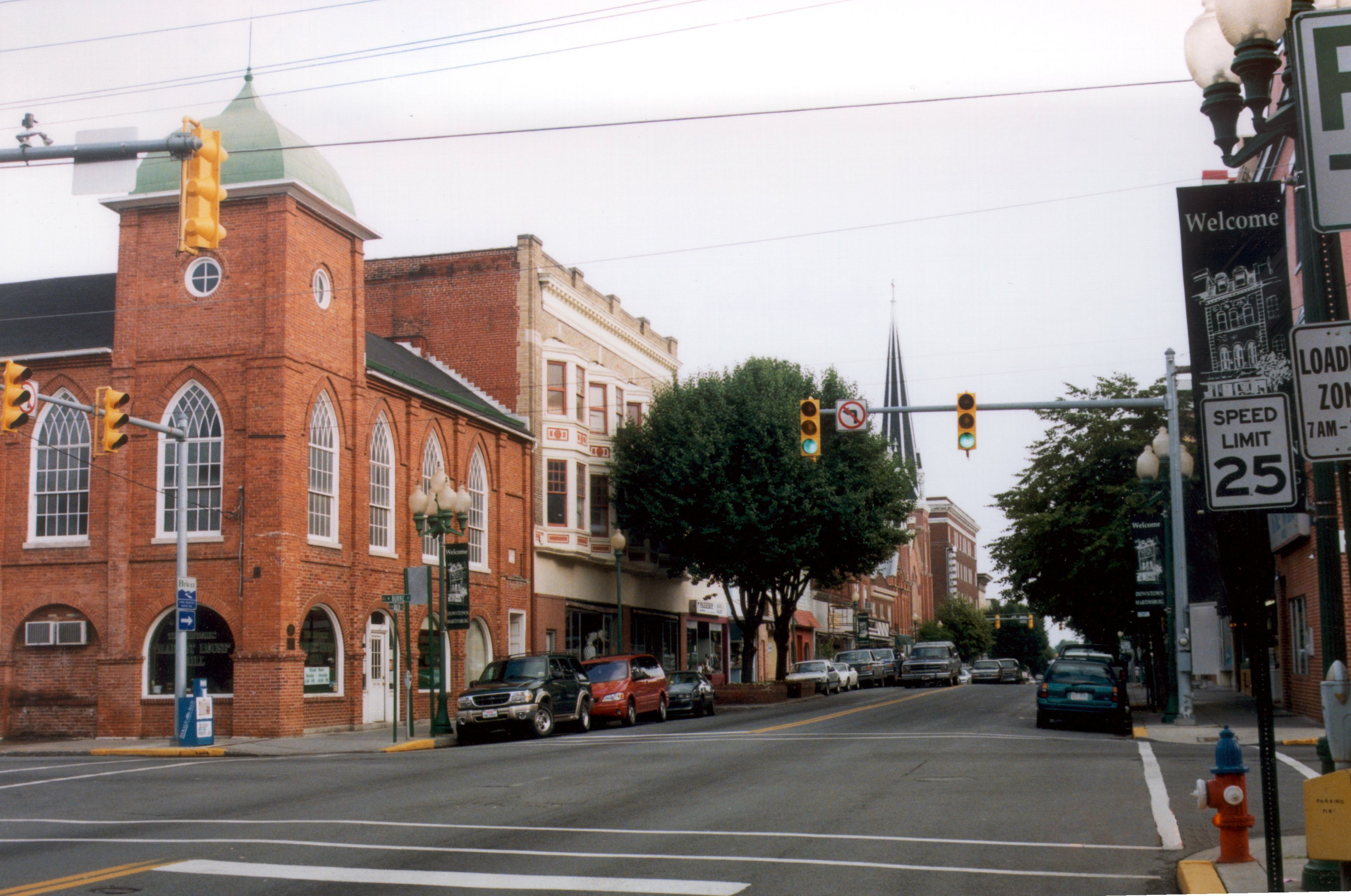
On August 8, 1991, Casolaro arrived in Martinsburg, West Virginia, to meet a source who, he said, had promised to provide an important missing piece of his story.

On August 5, 1991, Casolaro phoned Bill McCoy, a retired Army CID officer to tell him that Time magazine had assigned him an article about the Octopus. He further claimed to be working with reporter Jack Anderson, and that publishers Little, Brown and Time Warner had offered to finance the effort. All of these claims were later shown to be false: Little and Brown, for example, had rejected his Octopus manuscript over a month earlier.

On the same day, Casolaro's friend Ben Mason agreed to talk to Casolaro about his finances. A few days later, Casolaro showed Mason a 22-point outline for his book and expressed frustration at having been tied up with a literary agent who was unable to sell it for the last eighteen months. He also allegedly complained about his sleep being disturbed for the previous three months by calls during the night.

The following day, a neighbor of Casolaro's and longtime housekeeper, Olga, helped Casolaro pack a black leather tote. She remembers his packing a thick sheaf of papers into a dark brown or black briefcase. Casolaro said he was leaving for several days to visit Martinsburg, West Virginia, to meet a source who promised to provide an important missing piece to his story. This was the last time Olga saw him. Olga told The Village Voice that she answered several threatening telephone calls at Casolaro's home that day. She said that one man called at about 9:00 a.m. and said, "I will cut his body and throw it to the sharks". Less than an hour later, a different man said: "Drop dead." There was a third call, but Olga remembered only that no one spoke and that she heard music as though a radio were playing. A fourth call was the same as the third, and a fifth call, this one silent, came later that night.

=== Last known sightings ===
According to The Village Voice, Casolaro's whereabouts between late in the day of August 8 and the afternoon of August 9 are unknown. The day before he died, according to The Martinsburg Morning Journal, he ate at a Pizza Hut, where he told the waitress he liked her eyes and quoted The Great Gatsby to her. He met Honeywell engineer William Richard Turner at the Sheraton at about 2:30 p.m. on August 9. Turner says he gave Casolaro some documents, and that they spoke for a few minutes. Witnesses reported that Casolaro spent the next few hours at a Martinsburg restaurant. A bartender there told police that he had seemed lonely and depressed. The police further learned that Casolaro was seen at Heatherfields, the cocktail lounge at the Sheraton, at around 5 p.m. with a man described by a waitress as "maybe Arab or Iranian."

At about 5:30 p.m. that night, Casolaro met Mike Looney, who was staying in the room next to Casolaro's room 517. They chatted on two occasions—first at about 5:30 p.m. and then again at about 8:00 p.m. Looney later explained, "[Casolaro] said he was there to meet an important source who was going to give him what he needed to solve the case." According to Looney, Casolaro claimed that his source was scheduled to arrive by 9:00 p.m. Around that time, Casolaro left Looney, explaining that he had to make a telephone call. He returned a few minutes later and said that his source might have "blown him off." Casolaro and Looney talked until about 9:30 p.m. At about 10:00 p.m., Casolaro bought coffee at a nearby convenience store. That was the last time anyone reported seeing him alive.

=== Death ===
At about noon on August 10, 1991, housekeeping staff discovered Casolaro naked in the bathtub of room 517. His wrists had been slashed deeply. There were three or four wounds on his right wrist and seven or eight on his left. Blood was splattered on the bathroom wall and floor, and according to Ridgeway and Vaughan, "the scene was so gruesome that one of the housekeepers fainted when she saw it."

Under Casolaro's body, paramedics found an empty Milwaukee beer can, two white plastic liner-trash bags, and a single edge razor blade. There was also a half-empty wine bottle nearby. Ridgeway and Vaughan write that nothing was placed in the bathtub drain to prevent debris from draining away, and none of the bathwater was saved. Other than the gruesome scene, the hotel room was clean and orderly. There was a legal pad and a pen present on the desk; a single page had been torn from the pad, and a message written on it: "To those who I love the most: Please forgive me for the worst possible thing I could have done. Most of all I'm sorry to my son. I know deep down inside that God will let me in."

Based on the note, the absence of a struggle, no sign of a forced entry, and the presence of alcohol, police judged the case a straightforward suicide. After inspecting the scene, they found four more razor blades in their envelopes in a small package. Police interviews further revealed that no one had seen or heard anything suspicious. The Martinsburg police contacted authorities in Fairfax, Virginia, who said they would notify Casolaro's family.

Police investigation

The first autopsy was performed on Casolaro's body at West Virginia University on August 14, 1991. The coroner determined that blood loss was the cause of death, and that death had occurred from one to four hours before the body was discovered, or roughly between 8:00 a.m. and 11:00 a.m. on August 10.

The day after Casolaro's body was found, Village Voice editor Dan Bischoff received an anonymous telephone call alerting him to Casolaro's death. By Tuesday, August 13, Ridgeway and Vaughan write, the "rumors were flying, ... and by the next day, the crazies started coming out of the woodwork. There were vague unsubstantiated rumors that the Mafia was somehow involved, and the wildest story even suggested that the undertaker was an employee of the CIA, hired to clean up after an agency assassination." Even at the funeral, they write, the family felt "engulfed by mysteries". As the ceremony drew to a close, a highly decorated military officer in U.S. Army dress reportedly arrived in a limousine. Accompanied by another man in plain clothes, the military man approached the coffin just before it was lowered into the ground, laid a medal on the lid, and saluted. No one recognized either man and, to this day, they have never been named or identified.

In a later development, it was rumoured that US Army General Colin Powell may have been the unannounced military guest at Casolaro's funeral. However, this theory has been debunked as the US military does not issue medals to civilians.

It was then revealed that the military man was a personal friend of Danny who had requested privacy. Danny had praised his military friend and stated that he had often dreamed of being a decorated member of the armed forces. This caused the military man to gift one of his own medals to Danny, posthumously, at the funeral. This information and development was revealed and released publicly by Zachary Treitz and Christian Hansen, who later lodged Freedom of Information Act requests on the case and made a documentary about the funeral after being personally contact by Casolaro's military friend.

After Casolaro's death was reported by several mainstream news organizations, police re-examined room 517. The adjacent rooms had been rented the evening of Casolaro's death — one by Mike Looney, the other by an unnamed family. No one reported hearing anything unusual either on the night of August 9 or the morning of August 10. In January 1992, about five months after Casolaro's death, Dr. Frost of the West Virginia state medical examiner's office performed another autopsy; he returned a second suicide verdict, citing blood loss as the cause of death. Frost said there was evidence of the early stages of multiple sclerosis, but the degree of severity was probably minor. Toxicology analysis uncovered traces of several drugs: antidepressants, acetaminophen, and alcohol. He wrote: "There was nothing present in any way that could have incapacitated Casolaro so he would have been incapable of struggling against an assailant, let alone been sufficient to kill him."

Ron Rosenbaum, a journalist acquaintance of Casolaro's, speculated in Vanity Fair that Casolaro may have intended his suicide to appear to be murder triggered by his research, in order to have others look into the story after his death.

Later investigations showed that the FBI misled Congress about investigating Casolaro's death. Members of an FBI task force looking into Casolaro's death "questioned the conclusion of suicide" and recommended further investigation. This level of doubt "was especially significant, because even at that time (December 1992), it was understood that to express those views risked one's career." FBI documents show that some files on Casolaro are being withheld from public release, which is contradicted by the FBI saying the files are missing entirely.

Martinsburg police released case details to Zachary Treitz and Christian Hansen due to a Freedom of Information Act request on the closed case. After initially being denied the information as the Department of Justice claimed to have taken over the case, the results found contradicted the statement released by the police department back in 1991. The results revealed there was another person who visited Danny's hotel room that night. The eye-witness provided their statement in a written note and a sketch was performed. This sketch and statement eerily matches the description of a man named Joseph Cuellar, a former military intelligence official. According to Cuellar's son, "Part of what his specialty was to be able to infiltrate, retract information, to find out what someone potentially knows and what they don't know." Cuellar was known well for his "psychological warfare." Based on witness interviews, a friend of Danny's stated he had a brief interaction with Joseph at a bar local to his hometown weeks before Danny's "suicide." In these interactions, Danny shared his knowledge of the "Octopus," revealing information about international intelligence agencies, organized crime, and government corruption. This introduces a new theory - that Danny Casolaro was murdered due to his knowledge of dark crime being committed with taxpayer dollars. This information put whoever was in charge of these operations and their allies at risk for being exposed for their heinous acts.

== In popular culture ==
Suspicions of homicide were presented on the US television show Unsolved Mysteries in 1993 during season 5. Journalists, family members, William Hamilton (owner of Inslaw who co-developed PROMIS), Michael Riconosciuto, and an attorney general in the Nixon administration, Elliot Richardson, were interviewed. Richardson said the affair "at its outer reaches entails a far more sinister kind of conspiracy than anything revealed in Watergate". A full autopsy showed signs of struggle, disputing earlier findings, and various information suggesting foul play that contradicted official findings of suicide was presented.

Dominic Orlando, Casolaro's cousin, wrote a play based on Casolaro's story in 2008 called Danny Casolaro Died For You. In January 2013, Aviation Cinemas Productions and Caliber Media optioned the film rights to the story of Danny Casolaro based on Orlando's play. Adam Donaghey, Eric Steele, Dallas Sonnier and Jack Heller were set to produce with Eric Steele directing. Production was set to begin in 2015. On February 28, 2024, Netflix released the four-part docu-series American Conspiracy: The Octopus Murders exploring the complex case of Casolaro's death.
