= Samuel Israel III =

American fraudster and hedge fund manager

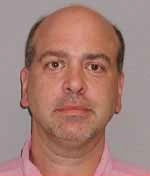
- Born: July 20, 1959 (age 67); New Orleans, Louisiana, United States
- Occupations: Former hedge fund manager and investment advisor
- Status: Incarcerated
- Criminal charge: Fraud
- Penalty: Sentenced to 22 years

Samuel Israel III (born July 20, 1959) is an American fraudster and former hedge fund manager for the Bayou Hedge Fund Group, which he founded in 1996. In 2008, Israel was sentenced to 20 years in prison and ordered to forfeit $300 million for defrauding his investors.

== Early life and education ==
Israel was born into a family of wealthy commodities traders. He attended Hackley School in Tarrytown, New York. He attended Tulane University but does not have a college degree.

== Career ==
In 1996 Israel founded the Bayou Hedge Fund Group, which raised $450 million from its investors and for which Israel was CEO. Bayou and Israel misappropriated these funds for personal use, running what would later be revealed as a Ponzi scheme. After poor returns in 1998, the firm founded a dummy accounting firm, which they hired to audit themselves in order to keep up appearances to investors.

In an attempt to recoup investing losses, Israel became embroiled in a series of highly speculative if not outright fraudulent schemes. He gave a $10 million loan to Robert Booth Nichols, a self-described espionage agent who gave Israel as collateral a series of supposed bonds from a vast and secretive "shadow market" similar to the prime bank fraud. These and other schemes all were unsuccessful for Israel, who was also heavily abusing cocaine and dealing with a series of painful surgeries.

The scheme was exposed after a series of investors grew suspicious and demanded their funds from Bayou only to be rebuffed. On September 29, 2005 the Commodity Futures Trading Commission (CFTC) filed charges against Bayou, Israel, and Bayou CFO Daniel Marino. The next year, the hedge fund filed for Chapter 11 bankruptcy-court protection.

== Manhunt and arrest ==
Israel pled guilty and on April 14, 2008, was sentenced to 20 years in prison and ordered to forfeit $300 million to compensate victims. He was allowed to remain free until being sent to prison, due to pre-existing medical issues that needed treatment.

Israel failed to report to prison as ordered on June 9, 2008. His 2006 GMC Envoy was found abandoned on the Bear Mountain Bridge on June 10, 2008 with the phrase "Suicide is Painless" written in dust on the vehicle's hood. The phrase is the title of the theme song for both the movie and TV series M*A*S*H.

Police suspected Israel attempted to fake his own death in order to avoid prison. Israel and his girlfriend were featured on America's Most Wanted.

Israel's girlfriend, Debra Ryan, was arrested later that same month for aiding and abetting his escape, and was released on bail. Ryan admitted to helping Israel escape, and also stated she and Israel parked an RV loaded with Israel's belongings near Bear Mountain Bridge on the day before his disappearance.

Israel surrendered to authorities on July 2, 2008 at the police station in Southwick, Massachusetts. As a consequence, he was further sentenced on July 15, 2009, to an additional two years in prison while his girlfriend was sentenced to three years' probation. Israel was serving his sentence at Federal Correctional Institution, Butner Low in Butner, North Carolina. In 2019, he applied for early release, citing the First Step Act. This application was denied, and Israel's scheduled release date was May 10, 2026.

Israel has cited onging chronic health problems in his bids for compassionate early release. His requests were denied in 2014 and 2019. Judge Colleen McMahon agreed in her 2019 ruling that Israel's health was poor, but she also said early release would "make a mockery of the sentencing statute" if Israel were released early, furthermore objecting to lenient sentencing for "white-collar criminals who have privileged backgrounds".

The Federal Bureau of Prisons' (BOP) website states that Israel, whose BOP Register Number was 84430-054, is no longer in BOP custody.

== In popular culture ==
A Dateline segment about him aired on September 5, 2008. Israel is the subject of the "Suicide is Painless" episode of American Greed on CNBC, first broadcast on February 3, 2010.

In the 2023 Netflix documentary series Madoff: The Monster of Wall Street detailing the rise and fall of Bernie Madoff, the arrest of Israel is depicted as a precursor to the public uncovering of Madoff's multibillion-dollar Ponzi scheme.

== See also ==
- Marcus Schrenker, convicted after attempting to stage his own death
- Octopus: Sam Israel, the Secret Market, and Wall Street's Wildest Con, by Guy Lawson
