= Michael Riconosciuto =

American electronics and computer expert

- Born: Michael James Riconosciuto; 1947 or 1948 (age 78–79); Tacoma, Washington
- Occupations: Engineer, arms dealer, drug trafficker
- Status: Released from custody in 2017 #21309-086
- Convictions: Possession of more than 100 grams of methamphetamine with intent to distribute, conspiracy to manufacture and distribute methamphetamine

Michael James Riconosciuto (born 1947 or 1948) is an American electronics and computer expert who was arrested in early 1991, shortly after providing Inslaw, Inc. with an affidavit in support of their lawsuit against the United States Department of Justice. Riconosciuto professed a defense centered on the Inslaw Affair (a legal case in which the U.S. government was charged with illegal use of computer software). Riconosciuto claimed to have reprogrammed Inslaw's case-management program (PROMIS) with a secret "back-door" to allow clandestine tracking of individuals. Riconosciuto stated that he had been threatened with prosecution by a Justice Department official. Riconosciuto provided an affidavit detailing threats to a House Select Committee investigating the Inslaw Affair.

== Early life ==
Riconosciuto was born to Marshall and Twylla Riconosciuto and raised in Tacoma, Washington. He had a brother named Joseph who was approximately four years younger than him.

Riconosciuto was recognized for some technical and scientific talents early in his life. Riconosciuto claims he knew conspiracy-theory figure Fred Crisman as a child. When he was only twelve years old, The Tacoma News Tribune and Ledger called him a "modern Da Vinci" in a 1960 article describing a phone network he established for himself and thirteen friends in Tacoma, experiments he conducted with underwater microphones and plant cognition, an intercom system he developed in his home and a radio class he helped teach at a local YMCA. By the summer of 1964, before his junior year of high school, Riconosciuto built and lived in an underwater house complete with television, radio, "and other common necessities." He also set up the stereo sound system in Bellarmine Preparatory School's auditorium. As a teenager, he constructed a working argon laser, a feat that earned him an invitation to Stanford University as a research assistant. His work on underwater acoustics and his laser drew the attention of the United States Department of the Navy which offered him several college scholarships before he had even successfully demonstrated his laser.

Riconosciuto was employed as an engineer at a mine in Maricopa, California. Hercules Properties, Ltd. had raised financing and purchased a 167-acre (0.68 km^{2}) contaminated waste-disposal site which had once been a portion of a 1,300-acre (5.3 km^{2}) TNT and fertilizer manufacturer known as Hercules Powder Works.

== Allegations ==
=== Cabazon murders ===
Nathan Baca's Emmy winning series "The Octopus Murders" featured documents from the archives of Michael Riconosciuto. These documents have been the subject of interest for recently reopened cold case homicide investigations.

=== Inslaw Affair ===
In early 1991, Riconosciuto filed an affidavit before a House judiciary committee investigating the bankruptcy case of Inslaw Inc. v. United States Government. Riconosciuto was called to testify before Congress regarding the modification of PROMIS, a case-management software program developed for the Department of Justice by Washington, D.C.–based Inslaw Inc. Riconosciuto declared he had been under the direction of Earl Brian, who was then a controlling shareholder and director of Hadron, Inc. He claimed Brian, an associate of Ronald Reagan, was involved in a secret agreement with the Iranian government to delay the release of Americans held hostage in Iran until after the 1980 United States presidential election, and the PROMIS software was stolen in order to raise funds for Brian's payment.

Within eight days of this declaration, Riconosciuto was arrested for conspiracy to manufacture, conspiracy to distribute, possession with intent to distribute, and with distribution—a total of ten counts related to methamphetamine and methadone.

During his trial, Riconosciuto accused the Drug Enforcement Administration of stealing two copies of his tape. Riconosciuto also claimed he himself had disposed of a third tape.

In addition to his claims of a government "frame up" related to Inslaw, Riconosciuto maintained the chemical laboratory on his property was in use for the extraction of precious metals such as platinum in a highly specialized mining operation.

No drug-lab contamination was found at the laboratory site and a member of the DOE's Hazardous Spill Response Team asserted that high barium levels on the property were unlikely to be the result of Riconosciuto's work. Barium does have specialized usage for metallurgy with regards to the processing of platinum group metals.

In his investigation of the allegations surrounding the Inslaw case, Special Counsel Nicholas J. Bua was particularly critical of several of Inslaw's witnesses. Bua found Riconosciuto had given inconsistent accounts in statements to the Hamiltons, his affidavit, and in testimony at his 1992 trial for manufacturing methamphetamine. Bua compared Riconosciuto's story about Promis to "a historical novel; a tale of total fiction woven against the background of accurate historical facts."

== Depiction in media ==
He appears in the American Conspiracy: The Octopus Murders, a documentary series on The Octopus Conspiracy.
