= Charles Cogan =

American academic and intelligence officer

Chuck Cogan
- Born: Charles G. Cogan; January 11, 1928; Melrose, Massachusetts, U.S.
- Died: December 14, 2017 (aged 89); Cambridge, Massachusetts, U.S.

Academic background
- Education: Harvard University (AB, DPA)

Academic work
- Discipline: International affairs Strategic studies
- Institutions: Harvard University; Central Intelligence Agency; Directorate of Operations

Charles G. "Chuck" Cogan (January 11, 1928 – December 14, 2017) was an American academic and intelligence officer who served in the Central Intelligence Agency (CIA) from 1954 to 1991.

== Background ==
Cogan was born in Melrose, Massachusetts. He earned a Bachelor of Arts degree in history from Harvard University and served in the United States Army during the Korean War.

From 2006 until his death, he was an associate at Harvard University's Belfer Center for Science and International Affairs. At the CIA, Cogan's roles included chief of the Near East and South Asia Division in the CIA's Directorate of Operations (1979–1984) and Paris station chief (1984–1989). He graduated from the John F. Kennedy School of Government at Harvard University in 1992 with a Doctor of Public Administration degree.

Cogan died in Cambridge, Massachusetts, in 2017.

== Books ==
- Oldest Allies, Guarded Friends: the United States and France Since 1940, Praeger 1994, ISBN 0-275-95116-2.
- Charles de Gaulle: A Brief Biography with Documents, Bedford Books of St. Martin's Press, 1996, ISBN 0-312-12804-5.
- Forced to Choose: France, the Atlantic Alliance, and NATO - Then and Now, Praeger, 1997, ISBN 0-275-95704-7.
- The Third Option: the Emancipation of European Defense, 1989-2000, Praeger, 2001, ISBN 0-275-96948-7.
- French Negotiating Behavior: Dealing with La Grande Nation (USIP Press, 2003).
- La République de Dieu, Editions Jacob-Duvernet, 2008, ISBN 978-2-84724-183-9.
