= Bayou Hedge Fund Group =

Fraudulent investment scheme, 1996–2006

The Bayou Hedge Fund Group (1996-2006) was a group of companies and hedge funds founded and headed by Samuel Israel III. Approximately $450m was raised by the group from investors, who were defrauded from nearly the start with funds being misappropriated for personal use.

== History ==
After poor returns in 1998, the investors were lied to about the fund's returns, and a fake accounting firm was set up to provide misleading audited results.

In 2005, Samuel Israel III and CFO Daniel Marino pleaded guilty to multiple charges including conspiracy and fraud. Marino was convicted of fraud and sentenced to 20 years in prison. Israel was sentenced to 20 years prison and ordered to forfeit $300 million. At his sentencing Israel said "I lied to you and I cheated you and I cannot put into words how sorry I am."

== Scandal ==
Starting with $600,000 of outside money in 1996, investors eventually gave the fund US$300 million. Investors were allured by a prospectus stating there would be prudent hedge fund management leading to an anticipated value of US$7.1 billion in ten years. In 1998-1999 trading losses accumulated quickly. The company started a dummy accounting firm, Richmond Fairfield Associates, and hired it to audit themselves.

According to federal prosecutors, Bayou had lied about its operations since the beginning; he is alleged to have "overstated gains, understated losses, and reported gains where there were losses." Court documents show that Bayou never made any money. In mid-2004, Bayou sent a letter to investors, claiming that its assets valued in excess of US$450 million.

In 2004, Samuel Israel III and Daniel Marino, the CEO and CFO, respectively, stopped trading fully and spent all resources on covering losses. Over the course of six days in July 2004, Bayou withdrew about $161 million from five bank accounts. They were eventually caught, wiring US$100 million overseas.

== Aftermath ==
In July 2005, a skeptical investor began asking questions about Bayou's auditor and assets. Soon afterward, Israel shut down the fund. In mid-August, the investor picked up a redemption check from Marino–only to have it bounce. When he returned seeking answers, he found an empty office and a note from Marino admitting that Bayou was a fraud.

On September 29, 2005, the Commodity Futures Trading Commission (CFTC) filed a complaint against Bayou, Israel, Marino, and Richmond Fairfield in the United States District Court for the Southern District of New York, alleging misappropriation and fraud.

The hedge fund filed for Chapter 11 bankruptcy-court protection in White Plains, New York, in 2006.

Over $100 million seized by authorities after the collapse had not yet been distributed to victims as of June 24, 2008.

On 14 April 2008, Israel was sentenced to 20 years in prison and ordered to forfeit $300 million after pleading guilty to defrauding investors in his now-bankrupt firm. On 10 June 2008, it was reported by the press that Israel may have committed suicide after a car registered to him was found abandoned on the Bear Mountain Bridge that spans one of the deepest stretches of the Hudson River in New York. It was the same day that Israel was supposed to begin serving his 20-year prison sentence.

Israel later turned himself in to federal authorities in Southwick, Massachusetts on July 2, 2008. NBC aired a Dateline segment about him on September 5, 2008.
