= Inslaw =

American technology corporation

INSLAW, Incorporated
- Type: Private
- Industry: Information Technology
- Predecessor: Institute for Law and Social Research (1973−1981)
- Founded: Washington, D.C., U.S. (January 1981)
- Founder: William Anthony Hamilton
- Headquarters: Washington, D.C.
- Products: CJIS; MODULAW; PROMIS
- Website: inslawinc.com

Inslaw, Inc. is a Washington, D.C.–based information technology company that markets case management software for corporate and government users. Inslaw is known for developing PROMIS, an early case management software system. It is also known for a lawsuit that it brought against the United States Department of Justice (DOJ) in 1986 over PROMIS, alleging that the Justice Department had dishonestly conspired to "drive Inslaw out of business 'through trickery, fraud and deceit'" by withholding payments to Inslaw and then pirating the software.

Inslaw won damages in bankruptcy court, but these were overturned on appeal. The suit resulted in several Justice Department internal reviews, two Congressional investigations, the appointment of a special counsel by Attorney General William P. Barr, and a lengthy review of the special counsel's report under Attorney General Janet Reno. Inslaw's claims were finally referred by Congress to the Court of Federal Claims in 1995, and the dispute ended with the Court's ruling against Inslaw in 1998. During the 12-year long legal proceedings, Inslaw accused the Department of Justice of conspiring to steal its software, attempting to drive it into Chapter 7 liquidation, using the stolen software for covert intelligence operations against foreign governments, and involvement in a murder. These accusations were eventually rejected by the special counsel and the Court of Federal Claims.

== History of Inslaw ==
Inslaw began as a non-profit organization called the Institute for Law and Social Research. The Institute was founded in 1973 by William A. Hamilton to develop case management software for law enforcement office automation. Funded by grants and contracts from the Law Enforcement Assistance Administration (LEAA), the Institute developed a program it called "PROMIS", an acronym for Prosecutors' Management Information System, for use in law enforcement record keeping and case-monitoring activities. When Congress voted to abolish the LEAA in 1980, Hamilton decided to continue operating as a for-profit corporation and market the software to current and new users. In January 1981 Hamilton established the for-profit Inslaw, transferring the Institute's assets over to the new corporation.

== Development of PROMIS ==
Briefing papers from Inslaw on the use of the PROMIS software.

PROMIS (Prosecutors Management Information System) was a case management software developed by Inslaw. The software program was developed with aid from the Law Enforcement Assistance Administration to aid prosecutors' offices in tracking cases. PROMIS software was originally written in COBOL for use on mainframe computers; later a version was developed to run on 16 bit mini-computers such as the Digital Equipment Corporation PDP-11. The primary users of this early version of the software were the United States Attorneys Office of the District of Columbia, and state and local law enforcement. Both the mainframe and 16 bit mini-computer versions of PROMIS were developed under LEAA contracts, and in later litigation, both Inslaw and DOJ eventually agreed that the early version of PROMIS was in the public domain, meaning that neither the Institute nor its successor had exclusive rights to it.

== The Promis implementation contract ==
In 1979, the DOJ contracted with the Institute to do a pilot project that installed versions of PROMIS in four US Attorneys offices; two using the mini-computer version, and the other two a "word-processor" version which the Institute was developing. Encouraged by the results, the Department decided in 1981 to go ahead with a full implementation of locally based PROMIS systems, and issued a request for proposals (RFP) to install the mini-computer version of PROMIS in the 20 largest United States Attorneys offices. This contract, usually called the "implementation contract" in later litigation, also included developing and installing "word-processor" versions of PROMIS at 74 smaller offices. The now for-profit Inslaw responded to the RFP, and in March 1982 was awarded the three-year $10 million contract by the contracting division, the Executive Office of United States Attorneys (EOUSA). Having previously developed a 16-bit version of PROMIS, Inslaw developed a 32-bit version, for various operating systems, specifically VAX/VMS, Unix, OS/400, and (in the 1990s) Windows NT.

=== Contract disputes and Inslaw bankruptcy ===
The contract did not go smoothly. Disputes between EOUSA and Inslaw began soon after its execution. A key dispute over proprietary rights had to be solved by a bi-lateral change to the original contract. (This change, "Modification 12," is discussed below.) EOUSA also determined that Inslaw was in violation of the terms of an "advance payment" clause in the contract. This clause was important to Inslaw's financing and became the subject of months of negotiations. There were also disputes over service fees. During the first year of the contract, the DOJ did not have the hardware to run PROMIS in any of the offices covered by the contract. As a stopgap measure, Inslaw provided PROMIS on a time-share basis through a VAX computer in Virginia, allowing the offices to access PROMIS on the Inslaw VAX through remote terminals, until the needed equipment was installed on-site. EOUSA claimed that Inslaw had overcharged for this service and withheld payments.

The DOJ ultimately acquired Prime computers, and Inslaw began installing PROMIS on these in the second year of the contract, in August 1983. The "word-processor" PROMIS installation, however, continued to have problems, and in February 1984 the DOJ cancelled this portion of the contract. Following this cancellation, the financial condition of Inslaw worsened, and the company filed for Chapter 11 bankruptcy in February 1985.

=== Proprietary rights dispute ===
The implementation contract called for the installation of the mini-computer version of PROMIS, plus some later modifications that had also been funded by LEAA contracts and, like the mini-computer version, were in the public domain. In addition, the contract data rights clause "gave the government unlimited rights in any technical data and computer software delivered under the contract." This presented a potential conflict with Inslaw's plans to market a commercial version of PROMIS which it called "PROMIS 82" or "Enhanced PROMIS." The issue came up early in the implementation contract, but was resolved by an exchange of letters in which DOJ signed off on the issue after Inslaw assured the DOJ that PROMIS 82 contained "enhancements undertaken by Inslaw at private expense after the cessation of LEAA funding."

The issue arose again in December 1982 when the DOJ invoked its contract rights to request all the PROMIS programs and documentation being provided under the contract. The reason the DOJ gave for this request in later litigation was that it was concerned about Inslaw's financial condition. At that point, DOJ had access to PROMIS only through a VAX time-sharing arrangement with Inslaw; if Inslaw failed, DOJ would be left without a copy of the software and data it was entitled to under the contract. Inslaw responded in February 1983 that it was willing to provide the computer tapes and documents for PROMIS, but that the tapes it had were for the VAX version of PROMIS, and included proprietary enhancements. Before providing the tapes, Inslaw wrote, "Inslaw and the Department of Justice will have to reach an agreement on the inclusion or exclusion" of the features.

The DOJ response to Inslaw was to emphasize that the implementation contract called for a version of PROMIS in which the government had unlimited rights and to ask for information about the enhancements Inslaw claimed as proprietary. Inslaw agreed to provide this information, but noted that it would be difficult to remove the enhancements from the time-sharing version of PROMIS and offered to provide the VAX version of PROMIS if the DOJ would agree to limit their distribution. In March 1983, the DOJ again informed Inslaw that the implementation contract required Inslaw to produce software in which the government had unlimited rights, and that delivery of software with restrictions would not satisfy the contract.

=== Contract revisions ===
After some back and forth, DOJ contracting officer Peter Videnieks sent a letter proposing a contract modification. Under the modification, in return for the software and data request, DOJ agreed not to disclose or disseminate the material "beyond the Executive Office for United States Attorney and the 94 United States Attorneys' Offices covered by the subject contract, until the data rights of the parties to the contract are resolved." To resolve the data rights issue, the letter proposed that Inslaw identify its claimed proprietary enhancements and demonstrate that the enhancements were developed "at private expense and outside the scope of any government contract." After these were identified, the government would then "either direct Inslaw to delete those enhancements from the versions of PROMIS to be delivered under the contract or negotiate with Inslaw regarding the inclusion of those enhancements in that software." Inslaw eventually agreed to this suggestion, and the change, referred to as "Modification 12," was executed in April 1983. Inslaw then provided DOJ with tapes and documentation for the VAX version of PROMIS.

Under this arrangement, however, Inslaw had substantial difficulty demonstrating the extent of the enhancements and the use of private funding in their development. It proposed several methods for doing this, but these were rejected by DOJ as inadequate. Inslaw's attempts to identify the proprietary enhancements and their funding ended when it began installing PROMIS on the USAO Prime computers in August 1983. By the end of the contract in March 1983, it had completed installing PROMIS in all 20 of the offices specified in the implementation contract. Since none of the available versions of PROMIS was compatible with the Department's new Prime computers, Inslaw ported the VAX version, which contained Inslaw's claimed enhancements, to the Prime computers.

== Inslaw's bankruptcy case ==
After Inslaw filed for Chapter 11 bankruptcy in February 1985, there were still disputes over implementation contract payments, and as a result the DOJ was listed as one of Inslaw's creditors. At the same time, the DOJ continued its office automation program and, in place of the originally planned "word-processor" version of PROMIS, it installed the version ported to Prime mini-computers in at least 23 more offices. When Inslaw learned of the installations, it notified EOUSA that this was in violation of Modification 12 and filed a claim for $2.9 million, which Inslaw said was the license fees for the software DOJ self-installed. Inslaw also filed claims for services performed during the contract, for a total of $4.1 million. The DOJ contracting officer, Peter Videnieks, denied all these claims.

Inslaw appealed the denial of the service fees to the Department of Transportation Board of Contract Appeals (DOTBCA). For the data rights claim, however, Inslaw took a different approach. In June 1986 it filed an adversary hearing in the Bankruptcy Court, claiming that DOJ's actions violated the automatic stay provision of the bankruptcy code by interfering with the company's rights to its software.

Inslaw's initial filing claimed that the contract disputes arose because the DOJ officials who administered the contract were biased against Inslaw. The filing specifically mentioned PROMIS project manager, C. Madison Brewer, and Associate Attorney General, D. Lowell Jensen. Brewer had previously been Inslaw's general counsel, but according to Inslaw had been terminated for cause. Inslaw claimed that Brewer's dismissal caused him to be unreasonably biased against Inslaw and owner William Hamilton. Jensen was a member of the project oversight committee at the time of the contract. He had helped to develop another competing case management software system several years earlier, and Inslaw claimed that this led him to be prejudiced against PROMIS, so that he ignored the unreasonable bias of Brewer.

=== "Independent handling" proceeding ===
In February 1987, Inslaw requested an "independent handling hearing", to force the DOJ to conduct the adversary hearing "independent of any Department of Justice officials involved in the allegations made" in the hearing. The bankruptcy court judge assigned to handle Inslaw's Chapter 11 proceedings, Judge George F. Bason, granted the request, and scheduled the hearing for June.

Prior to the hearing, Inslaw owners William and Nancy Hamilton spoke to Anthony Pasciuto, then the Deputy Director of the Executive Office of the United States Trustees (EOUST), a DOJ component responsible for overseeing the administration of bankruptcy cases. Pasciuto told the Hamiltons that the Director of the EOUST, Thomas Stanton, had pressured the U.S. Trustee assigned to the Inslaw case, Edward White, to convert Inslaw's bankruptcy from chapter 11 (reorganization of the company), to chapter 7 (liquidation). The Hamiltons had Inslaw's attorneys depose the people whom Pasciuto had named. One of them corroborated part of Pasciuto's claims: Cornelius Blackshear, then a U. S. Trustee in New York, swore in his deposition testimony that he was aware of pressure to convert the bankruptcy. Two days later, however, Blackshear submitted an affidavit recanting his testimony, saying that he had mistakenly recalled an instance of pressure from another case.

Blackshear repeated his retraction at the June hearing on Inslaw's request. Pasciuto also retracted part of his claims at this hearing, and said instead that he did not use the word "conversion." Judge Bason, however, chose to believe the original depositions of Pasciuto and Blackshear, and found that the DOJ "unlawfully, intentionally and willfully" tried to convert INSLAW's Chapter 11 reorganization case to a Chapter 7 liquidation "without justification and by improper means." In the ruling, Bason was harshly critical of the testimony of several DOJ officials, describing it as "evasive and unbelievable," or "simply on its face unbelievable." He enjoined the DOJ and the EOUST from contacting anyone in the U.S. Trustee's office handling the Inslaw case except for information requests.

=== Adversary proceeding ===
Inslaw's adversary proceeding followed a month after the independent handling hearing. The proceeding lasted for two and half weeks, from late July to August. In a bench ruling on September 28, Judge Bason found that DOJ project manager Brewer, "believing he had been wrongfully discharged by Mr. Hamilton and INSLAW, developed an intense and abiding hatred for Mr. Hamilton and INSLAW," and had used his position at DOJ to "vent his spleen." He also found that the DOJ "took, converted, stole, INSLAW's enhanced PROMIS by trickery, fraud, and deceit." Specifically, he found that DOJ had used the threat of terminating "advance payments" to get a copy of the enhanced PROMIS that it was not entitled to, and that it had negotiated modification 12 of the contract in bad faith, never intending to meet its commitment under the modification. In his ruling, Judge Bason again called the testimony of DOJ witnesses "biased", "unbelievable", and "unreliable."

=== Judge Bason not reappointed ===
Judge Bason was appointed to the District of Columbia Bankruptcy Court in February 1984 for a four-year term. He sought re-appointment early in 1987, but was informed in December that the Court of Appeals had chosen another candidate. Judge Bason then suggested in a letter to the Court of Appeals that DOJ might have improperly influenced the selection process because of his bench ruling for Inslaw. After learning of this letter, DOJ lawyers moved to recuse Judge Bason from the Inslaw case, but their motion was rejected, and Judge Bason remained on the case until the expiration of his term on February 8, 1988. In early February, Judge Bason filed a lawsuit seeking to prevent the judge the Court of Appeals had selected for the District of Columbia Bankruptcy Court from taking office, but the suit was rejected. Bason's last actions in the case were to file a written ruling on Inslaw's adversary proceeding, and to award damages and attorneys fees to Inslaw.

=== Appeals of the bankruptcy suit ===
After Judge Bason left the bench, the Inslaw bankruptcy was assigned to Baltimore bankruptcy judge James Schneider. Schneider accepted Inslaw's reorganization plan at the end of 1988 after a cash infusion from IBM. In the meantime, DOJ filed an appeal of Judge Bason's adversary suit ruling in the District of Columbia Circuit Court. In November 1989, Circuit Court Judge William Bryant upheld Bason's ruling. Reviewing the case under the "clear error" standard for reversal, Bryant wrote: "[T]here is convincing, perhaps compelling support for the findings set forth by the bankruptcy court."

DOJ appealed the Circuit Court decision and in May 1991, the Court of Appeals found the DOJ had not violated the automatic stay provisions of the bankruptcy code and that the Bankruptcy Court therefore lacked jurisdiction over Inslaw's claims against DOJ. It vacated the Bankruptcy Court's rulings and dismissed Inslaw's complaint. Inslaw appealed the decision to the Supreme Court, which declined to hear the case.

== Federal investigations ==
Inslaw's allegations against the Justice Department led to a number of investigations, including internal Department probes and Congressional investigations by the Senate's Permanent Subcommittee on Investigations (PSI) and the House Judiciary Committee. The DOJ eventually appointed a special counsel to investigate. After the special counsel issued his report, Inslaw responded with a lengthy rebuttal. The DOJ then re-examined the special counsel's findings, resulting in the release of a final Department review. During these federal investigations, Inslaw began making allegations of a broad, complex conspiracy to steal PROMIS, involving many more people and many more claims than the bankruptcy proceedings had covered. These later allegations are described below under the investigations which examined them.

=== Justice Department investigations ===
After Judge Bason's June 1987 bench ruling found several DOJ officials' testimony "unbelievable", DOJ's Office of Professional Responsibility (OPR) opened an investigation of DOJ staff who testified at the hearing, including C. Madison Brewer, Peter Videnieks, and EOUST director Thomas Stanton. It also opened a separate investigation of EOUST deputy director Anthony Pasciuto. OPR recommended Pasciuto be terminated, based on his hearing testimony that he had made false statements to the Hamiltons, but in its final report it found no evidence that the other officials investigated had applied pressure to convert Inslaw's bankruptcy or lied during the independent handling hearing. After Judge Bason issued his written ruling in January 1988, Inslaw's attorneys also complained to the DOJ's Public Integrity Section that Judge Blackshear and U.S. Trustee Edward White had committed perjury. Public Integrity opened an investigation that ultimately found perjury cases could not be proven, and recommended declining prosecution.

=== The Senate report ===
The first Congressional investigation into the Inslaw case came from the Senate's Permanent Subcommittee on Investigations (PSI). PSI's report was issued in September 1989, after a year and a half of investigation. During the investigation, Inslaw made a number of new allegations, which take up most of the PSI report.

==== New allegations ====
Inslaw's new allegations described the Justice Department dispute with Inslaw as part of a broad conspiracy to drive Inslaw into bankruptcy so that Earl Brian, the founder of a venture capital firm called Biotech (later Infotechnology), could acquire Inslaw's assets, including its software PROMIS. Inslaw owner William Hamilton told PSI investigators that Brian had first attempted to acquire Inslaw through a computer services corporation he controlled, called Hadron. Hamilton said that he rejected an offer from Hadron to acquire Inslaw, and that Brian then attempted to drive Inslaw into bankruptcy through his influence with Attorney General Edwin Meese.

Both Meese and Brian had served in the cabinet of Ronald Reagan when he was governor of California, and Meese's wife had later bought stock in Brian's company, so that Meese was willing to do this, Hamilton claimed. The contract dispute with DOJ was contrived by Brian and Meese with the help of Associate Attorney General Jensen, and PROMIS project manager Brewer.

Hamilton also complained that a DOJ automation program, 'Project Eagle', was part of a scheme to benefit Brian after he acquired PROMIS, and that an AT&T subsidiary, AT&T Information Systems, had engaged with the DOJ in a conspiracy to interfere with Inslaw's efforts to reorganize. He also told PSI investigators that the DOJ had undermined Bankruptcy Court Judge Bason's reappointment, and had attempted to undermine Inslaw's lead counsel in the bankruptcy suit.

==== Report findings ====
Senate investigators found no proof for any of these claims. Their report noted that the bankruptcy court ruling had not concluded that Jensen had engaged in a conspiracy against Inslaw and that their own investigation had found no proof that Jensen and Meese had conspired to ruin Inslaw or steal its product, or that Brian or Hadron were involved in a conspiracy to undermine Inslaw and acquire its assets.

The report did re-examine the bankruptcy finding that the DOJ had pressured the United States Trustee to recommend converting Inslaw's bankruptcy from Chapter 11 to Chapter 7, and found that EOUST director Thomas Stanton had improperly tried to get special handling for Inslaw's bankruptcy. He did this, the report stated, in order to gain support for the EOUST from the DOJ.

The report concluded that the Subcommittee found no proof for a broad conspiracy against Inslaw within the DOJ, or a conspiracy between DOJ officials and outside parties to force Inslaw into bankruptcy for personal benefit. However, it criticized DOJ for hiring a former Inslaw employee (Brewer) to oversee Inslaw's contract with EOUSA, and for failing to follow standard procedures in handling Inslaw's complaints. It also criticized the DOJ for a lack of cooperation with the Subcommittee, which delayed the investigation and undercut the Subcommittee's ability to interview Department employees.

=== The House report ===
Following the PSI report, the House Judiciary Committee began another investigation into the dispute. By the time the report was released in September 1992, Inslaw's bankruptcy suit had been first upheld in the D.C. Circuit Court, then vacated by the D.C. Appeals court. The House report thus took a different approach to several of the legal issues that the Senate report had discussed. Like the Senate report, much of the House report dealt with new evidence and new allegations from Inslaw.

The report raised "serious concerns" that Justice Department officials had schemed "to destroy Inslaw and co-opt the rights to its PROMIS software" and had misappropriated the software. The report was the outgrowth of a three-year investigation led by Jack Brooks, the committee's chairman, who had launched in investigation in 1989. The report faulted the Justice Department for a lack of cooperation in the investigation and found that "There appears to be strong evidence, as indicated by the findings in two Federal Court proceedings as well as by the committee investigation, that the Department of Justice 'acted willfully and fraudulently,' and 'took, converted and stole,' Inslaw's Enhanced PROMIS by 'trickery fraud and deceit.'"

==== New allegations ====
Inslaw's new evidence consisted of statements and affidavits from witnesses supporting Inslaw's previous claims. The most important of these witnesses was Michael Riconosciuto, who swore in an affidavit for Inslaw that businessman Earl Brian had provided him with a copy of Inslaw's enhanced Promis, supporting Inslaw's earlier claims that Brian had been interested in acquiring and marketing the software. A new allegation was also introduced in Riconosciuto's affidavit: Riconosciuto swore that he added modifications to enhanced PROMIS "to support a plan for the implementation of PROMIS in law enforcement and intelligence agencies worldwide." According to Riconosciuto, "Earl W. Brian was spearheading the plan for this worldwide use of the PROMIS computer software."

Another important witness was Ari Ben-Menashe, who also provided affidavits for Inslaw that Brian had brought both public domain and enhanced versions of PROMIS to Israel, and eventually sold the enhanced version to the Israeli government. Committee investigators interviewed Ben-Menashe in May 1991, and he told them that Brian sold enhanced PROMIS to both Israeli intelligence and Singapore's armed forces, receiving several million dollars in payment. He also testified that Brian sold public domain versions to Iraq and Jordan.

==== Report findings ====
On the issue of Inslaw's rights in "enhanced PROMIS", the House report found that "There appears to be strong evidence" supporting Judge Bason's finding that DOJ "acted willfully and fraudulently" when it "took, converted and stole" INSLAW's Enhanced PROMIS by "trickery, fraud and deceit." Like Judge Bason, the report found that DOJ did not negotiate with Inslaw in good faith, citing a statement by Deputy Attorney General Arnold Burns as "one of the most damaging statements received by the committee." According to the report, Burns told OPR investigators that Department attorneys informed him in 1986 that INSLAW's claim of proprietary rights was legitimate and that DOJ would probably lose in court on this issue. House Investigator found it "incredible" that DOJ would pursue litigation after such a determination, and concluded "This clearly raises the specter that the Department actions taken against INSLAW in this matter represent an abuse of power of shameful proportions."

On the new allegations brought by Inslaw, although the Committee conducted extensive investigations, the report did not make any factual findings on the allegations, it did conclude that further investigation was warranted into the statements and claims of Inslaw's witnesses. The report also discussed the case of Danny Casolaro, a free-lance writer who became interested in the Inslaw case in 1990, and began his own investigation. According to statements from Casolaro's friends and family, the scope of his investigation eventually expanded to include a number of scandals of the time, including the Iran-Contra affair, the October Surprise theory claims, and the BCCI banking scandal. In August 1991, Casolaro was found dead in a hotel room where he was staying. The initial coroner's report ruled his death suicide, but Casolaro's family and friends were suspicious, and a lengthy second autopsy was conducted. This also ruled Casolaro's death a suicide. Noting that Casolaro had encountered "a number of dangerous individuals associated with organized crime and the world of covert intelligence operations" and that "suspicious circumstances surrounding his death have led some law enforcement professionals and others to believe that his death may not have been a suicide", the House committee reported that further investigation was warranted. The Democratic majority called upon Attorney General Dick Thornburgh to compensate Inslaw immediately for the harm that the government had "egregiously" inflicted on Inslaw. The Republican minority dissented and the committee divided along party lines 21–13.

=== Bua report ===
In October 1991 William P. Barr succeeded Dick Thornburgh as Attorney General. In November, Barr appointed retired federal judge Nicholas J. Bua as a Special Counsel to investigate the allegations in the Inslaw case. Bua was granted authority to appoint his own staff and investigators, to impanel a grand jury, and to issue subpoenas. In March 1993 he issued a 267-page report.

The report concluded that there was no credible evidence to support Inslaw's allegations that DOJ officials conspired to help Earl Brian acquire PROMIS software, and that the evidence was overwhelming that there was no connection between Brian and PROMIS. It found the evidence "woefully insufficient" to support the claim that DOJ obtained enhanced PROMIS through "fraud, trickery, and deceit," or that DOJ illegally distributed PROMIS inside or outside of DOJ. It found no credible evidence that DOJ had influenced the selection process that replaced Judge Bason. It found "insufficient evidence" to confirm the allegation that DOJ employees sought to influence the conversion of Inslaw's bankruptcy or commit perjury to conceal the attempt to do so. Finally, it concluded that the DOJ had not sought to influence the investigation of Danny Casolaro's death, and that the physical evidence strongly supported the autopsy finding of suicide.

Bua's report came to a number of conclusions that contradicted earlier proceedings and investigations. Judge Bason had found that DOJ's claim it was concerned about Inslaw's financial condition when it requested a copy of PROMIS was a false pretext. Bua rejected this finding as "just plain wrong." The House report had cited Deputy Attorney General Burns' statements as evidence that DOJ knew it did not have a valid defense to Inslaw's claims. Bua found this interpretation "entirely unwarranted."

Bua was particularly critical of several of Inslaw's witnesses. He found that Michael Riconosciuto had given inconsistent accounts in statements to the Hamiltons, his affidavit, and in testimony at his 1992 trial for manufacturing methamphetamine. Bua compared Riconosciuto's story about PROMIS to "a historical novel; a tale of total fiction woven against the background of accurate historical facts."

Bua found Ari Ben-Menashe's affidavits for Inslaw inconsistent with his later statements to Bua, in which Ben-Menashe said that he had "no knowledge of the transfer of Inslaw's proprietary software by Earl Brian or DOJ" and denied that he had ever said this elsewhere. Ben-Menashe said that others simply assumed that he was referring in his previous statements to Inslaw's PROMIS, but acknowledged that one reason he failed to clarify this was because he was going to publish a book and "he wanted to make sure that his affidavit was filed in court and came to the attention of the public."

Bua also noted that the House October Surprise Task Force had examined Ben-Menashe's October Surprise allegations and found them "totally lacking in credibility," "demonstrably false from beginning to end," "riddled with inconsistencies and factual misstatements," and "a total fabrication." He specifically observed that the Task Force found no evidence to substantiate Ben-Menashe's October Surprise allegations about Earl Brian.

=== DOJ review ===
Inslaw responded to the Bua report with a 130-page Rebuttal, and another set of new allegations in an Addendum. These allegations included the claim that the DOJ's Office of Special Investigations was "a front for the Justice Department's own covert intelligence service" and that "another undeclared mission of the Justice Department's covert agents was to insure that investigative journalist Danny Casolaro remained silent about the role of the Justice Department in the INSLAW scandal by murdering him in west Virginia in August 1991."

By this time, Janet Reno had succeeded Barr as Attorney General after Bill Clinton's election as president. Reno then asked for a review of Bua's report with recommendations on appropriate actions. In September 1994, the Department released a 187-page review (written by Assistant Associate Attorney General John C. Dwyer) which concluded that "there is no credible evidence that Department officials conspired to steal computer software developed by Inslaw, Inc. or that the company is entitled to additional government payments." The review also reaffirmed the earlier police findings that Casolaro's death was a suicide and rejected Inslaw's claim that OSI agents had murdered Casolaro as "fantasy," with "no corroborative evidence that is even marginally credible."

== Court of Federal Claims trial and ruling ==
In May 1995, the United States Senate asked the U.S. Court of Federal Claims to determine if the United States owed Inslaw compensation for the government's use of PROMIS. On July 31, 1997, Judge Christine Miller, the hearing officer for the U.S. Court of Federal Claims ruled that all of the versions of PROMIS were in the public domain and that the government had therefore always been free to do whatever it wished with PROMIS. The following year, the appellate authority, a three-judge Review Panel of the same court, upheld Miller's ruling and in August 1998 informed the Senate of its findings.

== Conspiracy theories ==
The Inslaw affair generated a great deal of media attention at the time due to the peculiar circumstances and implications surrounding it. At the time of his death, Danny Casolaro was attempting to link the Inslaw affair with the October Surprise allegations, the Iran–Contra affair, and the Bank of Credit and Commerce International scandal into a "grand unified conspiracy" that he called "the Octopus". In 2024, Netflix true crime documentary series American Conspiracy: The Octopus Murders was released about the 1991 death of Danny Casolaro. It focuses on journalist Christian Hansen who revisits Casolaro's work and questions whether Casolaro actually died by suicide.

The program features interviews with Michael Riconosciuto, described by Rolling Stone as a "tech prodigy-turned-drug manufacturer and government operative who drops kernels of truth between what sound like madman ravings". Also interviewed is journalist Cheri Seymour, who reported being shown a doctored version of the Zapruder film in which John F. Kennedy appears to be assassinated by the Secret Service agent driving the car; Seymour interpreted this as an attempt to preemptively discredit her.

Affidavits created over the course of the Inslaw affair stated that "PROMIS was then given or sold at a profit to Israel and as many as 80 other countries by Dr. Earl W. Brian, a man with close personal and business ties to then-President Ronald Reagan and then-Presidential counsel Edwin Meese." Investigative journalist Nathan Baca's Emmy-winning series "The Octopus Murders" featured documents from the archives of Riconosciuto. These documents have been the subject of interest for recently reopened cold case homicide investigations. In addition to Casolaro's death, the deaths of various individuals with links to the Inslaw affair have been tied to the Clinton body count conspiracy theory.

== Later developments ==
A book written in 1997 by Fabrizio Calvi and Thierry Pfister claimed that the National Security Agency (NSA) had been "seeding computers abroad with PROMIS-embedded SMART (Systems Management Automated Reasoning Tools) chips, code-named Petrie, capable of covertly downloading data and transmitting it, using electrical wiring as an antenna, to U.S. intelligence satellites" as part of an espionage operation. A 1999 book by the British journalist Gordon Thomas, titled Gideon's Spies: The Secret History of the Mossad, repeated the claims of Ari Ben-Menashe that Israeli intelligence created and marketed a Trojan horse version of PROMIS in order to spy on intelligence agencies in other countries. In 2001, the Washington Times and Fox News each quoted federal law enforcement officials familiar with debriefing former FBI Agent Robert Hanssen as claiming that the convicted spy had stolen copies of a PROMIS derivative for his Soviet KGB handlers.

== See also ==
- PRISM (surveillance program)
