= American Conspiracy: The Octopus Murders =

2024 American television series

- Official poster
- Genre: Documentary; True crime
- Directed by: Zachary Treitz
- Music by: Jose Parody
- Country of origin: United States
- Original language: English
- No. of seasons: 1
- No. of episodes: 4

Production
- Executive producers: Jay Duplass; Mark Duplass; Mel Eslyn; Christian Hansen; Juliana Lembi; Zachary Treitz; Chapman Way; Maclain Way
- Producers: Maggie Ambrose; Shuli Harel
- Cinematography: Christopher Messina; Brett Jutkiewicz
- Editors: Sean Frechette; Eric Schuman; Jay Deuby
- Running time: 48–67 minutes
- Production companies: Duplass Brothers Productions; Stardust Frames Productions

Original release
- Network: Netflix
- Release: February 28, 2024

American Conspiracy: The Octopus Murders is a true crime television documentary series about the 1991 death of writer Danny Casolaro amid his conspiracy theories of a supposed international cabal that he labeled "the Octopus". The film follows director Zachary Treitz and his friend, journalist Christian Hansen, as they investigate the Casolaro case. The film was released on Netflix as a four-part docuseries on February 28, 2024.

== Plot ==
The documentary explores an investigation led by Danny Casolaro into what he termed "The Octopus," a supposed conspiracy involving the US government and its covert operations, and the circumstances around him being found deceased in a hotel room. The film discusses the Inslaw/PROMIS software conspiracy theories, the Iran–Contra affair and the 1980 October Surprise theory. Researcher Christian Hansen revisits Casolaro's work and questions whether Casolaro actually died by suicide. Hansen plays Casolaro in the film's re-enactments.

The film features interviews with Michael Riconosciuto, described by Rolling Stone as a "tech prodigy-turned-drug manufacturer and government operative who drops kernels of truth between what sound like madman ravings". Also interviewed is journalist Cheri Seymour, who reported being shown a doctored version of the Zapruder film in which John F. Kennedy appears to be assassinated by the Secret Service agent driving the car; Seymour interpreted this as an attempt to preemptively discredit her.

The “Murders” (plural) in the title refers to 5 specific deaths/murders, of people connected through the central characters in the story: Danny the journalist in Martinsburg, VA, Danny’s longtime friend Paul Marasca at his San Francisco apartment, and 3 people including the tribe’s security manager at the Cabazon tribal grounds in Ca. A couple other characters die at seemingly convenient times along the way, heart attacks etc. Also appearing is the often CIA adjacent Wackenhut Corp., which later became part of G4S Global, who run many of the prison camps built by the current administration.

== Reception ==
=== Critical reception ===
On the review aggregator website Rotten Tomatoes, 83% of 12 critics' reviews are positive. The website's consensus reads: "A handsomely produced delve into a truly far-out true crime tale, this American Conspiracy hooks its tentacles into viewers and doesn't let go." Metacritic, which uses a weighted average, assigned the film a score of 73 out of 100, based on 5 critics, indicating "generally favorable" reviews.

== See also ==
- Mirage Men, about a US military disinformation operation targeting Paul Bennewitz and Milton William Cooper. Cooper, like Seymour, reported seeing footage of secret service shooting JFK.
- Wormwood (miniseries), about the 1953 death of scientist Frank Olson
- The Last Narc
