= Earl Brian =

American businessman and physician (1942–2020)

Earl Winfrey Brian Jr. (1942 – November 2, 2020) was an American physician and businessman who served as Director of California's Department of Health Care Services, and then as Secretary of California's Agency for Health and Welfare under Governor Ronald Reagan. Following an unsuccessful run for the U.S. Senate in 1974, Brian headed several technology based firms during the 1970s and 80s. In 1991 however, Infotechnology, the venture capital firm he headed, filed for bankruptcy. Brian was later charged with conspiring to cover up the firm's financial difficulties and sentenced to four years in prison.

== Early career ==
Brian graduated from medical school at Duke University and served in the Army Medical Corps in Vietnam.

== Political career in California ==
After leaving the service in 1970, he was appointed first as Director of California's Department of Health Care Services (DHCS), then Secretary of Health and Welfare. During his term as secretary, Brian succeeded in implementing a requirement for a $2 co-payment from Medi-Cal recipients for each doctor's visit, but failed in an attempt to curtail medical benefits available under Medi-Cal when the state lost a suit brought by the California Medical Association. In 1974 Brian resigned his cabinet post and ran for the U.S. Senate seat held by Senator Alan Cranston (D–CA), but lost the Republican primary.

== Business and expansion ==
Brian then turned to business and in 1980 established his own company, Biotech Capital, a venture capital firm that invested in companies developing medical technology. Biotech later shifted its focus to news and information services, acquiring interest in the Financial News Network (FNN) and changing the name Biotech in 1987 to Infotechnology. In 1988, the company acquired United Press International (UPI), one of the two major American news wire services at the time.

== Conspiracy and fraud conviction ==
Infotechnology encountered financial difficulties and filed for bankruptcy in 1991, as did FNN and UPI. In 1995, Brian was charged with conspiracy and fraud for inflating the value of FNN and UPI in an attempt to secure loans to shore up the companies. He was convicted of the conspiracy charges in 1996 and sentenced to four years in prison.

== Death ==
Brian died on November 2, 2020, at the age of 78 in Easton, Maryland. He was buried at Arlington National Cemetery.
