= Timeline of the Iran–Contra affair =

The Iran–Contra affair was a political scandal in the United States that came to light in November 1986. During the Reagan administration, senior administration officials secretly facilitated the sale of arms to Iran, the subject of an arms embargo. Some U.S. officials also hoped that the arms sales would secure the release of hostages and allow U.S. intelligence agencies to fund the Nicaraguan Contras. Under the Boland Amendment, further funding of the Contras by the government had been prohibited by Congress.

== Timeline ==
- 1981: Operation Seashell / 1981 Armenia mid-air collision
- 1983/4: Operation Tipped Kettle: a 1980s US-Israeli government operation transferring weapons seized by Israeli forces from the Palestine Liberation Organization in Lebanon during Operation Peace for Galilee to the Nicaraguan Contras.

=== 1984 ===
- 23 July 1984: The Israeli general election proved inconclusive. The Labor and Likud party agreed to form a national unity government with a rotating prime minister.
- 31 August 1984: Robert McFarlane asked different US government agencies to reassess policy towards Iran.
- 13 September 1984: Shimon Peres of the Labor party is chosen as the Israeli prime minister for the coalition government.
- 12 October 1984: Congress bans military aid to the Contras.
- Late 1984: Iranian arms dealer Manucher Ghorbanifar discussed with Israeli officials ways of opening channels between Iran and the West. The discussion was held between Ghorbanifar and Yaakov Nimrodi, an arms dealer who was a former Israeli defense attache in Iran; Al Schwimmer, a founder of Israel's aircraft industry who was close to then Prime Minister Shimon Peres; and David Kimche, the general director of the Israeli foreign ministry. Ghorbanifar said many Iranian officials wanted to pursue a more pro-Western course but arms sales were necessary to gain sway with Ayatollah Ruhollah Khomeini.

=== 1985 ===
- April 1985: Michael Ledeen, who is a consultant for the National Security Council while the agency is conducting a strategic reassessment on Iran, met with Ghorbanifar in Israel and noted he had good contacts with moderates in Iran. Ledeen also met with Nimrodi who noted that the situation in Iran was in a state of change.
- 3 May 1985: Ledeen went a second time to Israel and met with Israeli prime minister Shimon Peres to discuss Iran and weapon transfers. At this time, Ledeen also met with Shlomo Gazit, the former head of Israeli military intelligence, and agreed with him that it was beneficial for Israel and the United States to open a channel with Iran.
- 17 May 1985: The Central Intelligence Agency produced a report on the possibility of strategic contacts with Iran and raised the issue of selling arms and ending the embargo on Iran.
- 3 July 1985: David Kimche, director-general of the Israeli foreign ministry, visited Washington D.C. and told McFarlane that Iranian officials wanted to begin a political dialogue with the United States. Kimche said he was confident that the political dialogue would lead to the freeing of American hostages being held by Hezbollah in Lebanon.
- 13 July 1985: McFarlane discussed with President Reagan the ideas raised by Kimche and received a signal to proceed with the talks.
- Mid-July 1985: Ghorbanifar met with Nimrodi, Schwimmer, Kimche and Adnan Khashoggi in Hamburg, Germany, to discuss possible arms sales.
- 6 August 1985: Kimche in early August visited Washington D.C. and told McFarlane the sale of 500 TOW antitank missiles to Iran could facilitate the release of the American hostages. McFarlane briefed President Reagan on the Israeli proposal to sell TOW antitank missiles to Iran via Israel. President Reagan, according to his initial statement to the Tower Commission and according to McFarlane, approved the shipment of arms by Israel to Iran.
- 20 August 1985: Israel sent 96 American-made BGM-71 TOW antitank missiles to Iran through an arms dealer named Manucher Ghorbanifar. Hours after receiving the weapons, the Islamic fundamentalist group Islamic Jihad released one hostage they had been holding in Lebanon, the Reverend Benjamin Weir.
- 14 September 1985 – 408 more TOWs
- 24 November 1985 – 18 Hawk anti-aircraft missiles
- 4 December 1985: Robert McFarlane resigns
- 4 December 1985: Oliver North, a military aide to the United States National Security Council (NSC), proposed a new plan for selling arms to Iran, which included two major adjustments: instead of selling arms through Israel, the sale was to be direct, and a portion of the proceeds would go to Contras, or Nicaraguan paramilitary fighters waging guerrilla warfare against the democratically elected Sandinista government, at a markup. North proposed a $15 million markup, while contracted arms broker Ghorbanifar added a 41% markup of his own.
- 6 December 1985: Oliver North tells officials in the Israeli defense ministry that future profits from the arms sales will go to help the Contras.
- 8 December 1985: McFarlane goes with North to London and meets with Manucher Ghorbanifar, Kimche, and Yaacov Nimrod an Israeli arms dealer.
- 16 December 1985: Paul S. Cutter and another are convicted of attempting to sell arms to Iran

=== 1986 ===
- 17 February 1986 – 500 TOWs
- 5 May 1986: indictments in the Brokers of Death arms case relating to arms sales to Iran, with Cyrus Hashemi the key US Customs informant
- 24 May 1986 – 508 TOWs, 240 Hawk spare parts
- 25 May 1986: McFarlane; North; Amiran Nir, the Israeli government official coordinating the Israeli part of the operation; retired CIA official, George Cave, an Iran expert; and Howard Teicher, a staff member from the National Security Council, flew to Tehran with Hawk spare parts. They met for four days with Iranian officials and unsuccessfully tried to gain the release of the American hostages in Lebanon.
- 29 July 1986: Nir briefed Vice President Bush and his chief of staff Craig L. Fuller, while they were in Israel on the updated details of the arms for hostage deal being negotiated by Israel and Iran.
- 4 August 1986 – More Hawk spares
- 5 October 1986: Corporate Air Services HPF821, an aircraft delivering supplies to the Contras, is shot down in Nicaragua; Eugene Hasenfus is the sole survivor.
- 28 October 1986 – 500 TOWs
- 3 November 1986: After a leak by Iranian Mehdi Hashemi, the Lebanese magazine Ash-Shiraa exposed the arrangement on 3 November 1986.
- 4 November 1986: after the operation is exposed then Vice President George H. W. Bush writes in his diary "I'm one of the few people that know fully the details ..." about the Iran weapons operation, although in public he asserts that he was "out of the loop -- no operational role."
- 26 November 1986: Tower Commission appointed
- 19 December 1986: Lawrence Walsh is appointed Independent Counsel for Iran/Contra Matters by the Special Division of the United States Court of Appeals for the District of Columbia.

=== 1987 ===
- 26 February 1987: Tower Commission report delivered to the president.
- 6 March 1987: Rep. Henry B. Gonzalez, Democrat of Texas, introduced articles of impeachment against President Reagan, leading to the joint hearings that dominated the summer.
- 5 May 1987: Start of Congressional Hearings.
- 6 August 1987: End of Congressional Hearings.
- 18 November 1987: Congressional Committees Investigating The Iran-Contra Affair publish their report

=== 1989 ===
- January 1989: charges in the Brokers of Death arms case dropped

=== 1993 ===
- 4 August 1993

Final Report of the Independent Counsel for Iran/Contra Matters is published.
