= Eclipse Group =

Private intelligence agency

Eclipse Group was a private intelligence agency run by former CIA officer Duane "Dewey" Clarridge, who was also the founding director of the CIA Counterterrorist Center. Until May 2010, Eclipse Group received funding from the US Government; it then relied on private donors. Its operations included obtaining information related to the politics of Afghanistan and the AfPak region.

Clarridge operated the Eclipse Group "from poolside at his home near San Diego.^{[2]} According to The New York Times, the Eclipse Group "fielded operatives in the mountains of Pakistan and the desert badlands of Afghanistan."^{[2]} Clarridge and the Eclipse Group "sought to discredit Ahmed Wali Karzai, the Kandahar power broker" who had "long been on the C.I.A. payroll, and planned to set spies on his half brother, the Afghan president, Hamid Karzai, in hopes of collecting beard trimmings or other DNA samples that might prove Mr. Clarridge's suspicions that the Afghan leader was a heroin addict."^{[2]} In November 2011, the Eclipse Group partnered with Blue Mountain in Libya before parting the following spring over unknown problems with contracts in Tripoli.

In addition to these efforts, Clarridge's "dispatches—an amalgam of fact, rumor, analysis and uncorroborated reports" were sent to U.S. military officials until at least 2010. According to one report, officials "found some credible enough to be used in planning strikes against militants in Afghanistan." Eclipse also fed information to conservative commentators, including Oliver L. North, a compatriot of Clarridge's from the Iran-contra days and subsequently a Fox News analyst, and Brad Thor, an author of military thrillers.^{[2]}

== See also ==
- Intelligence assessment
- Human intelligence (espionage)
