= Boland Amendment =

1982–84 US laws limiting support to Nicaraguan Contras

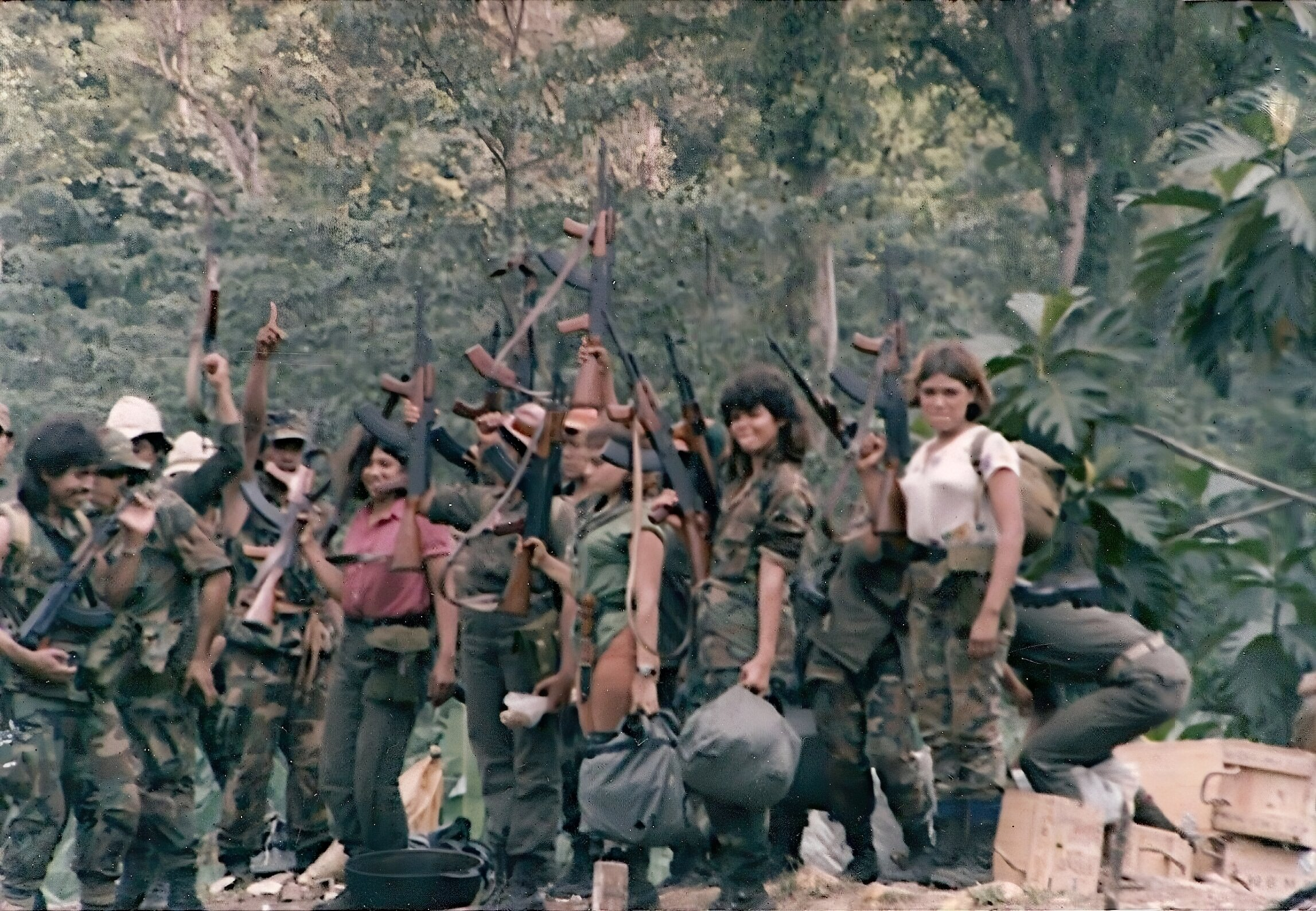
Contra members in Nueva Guinea, 1987

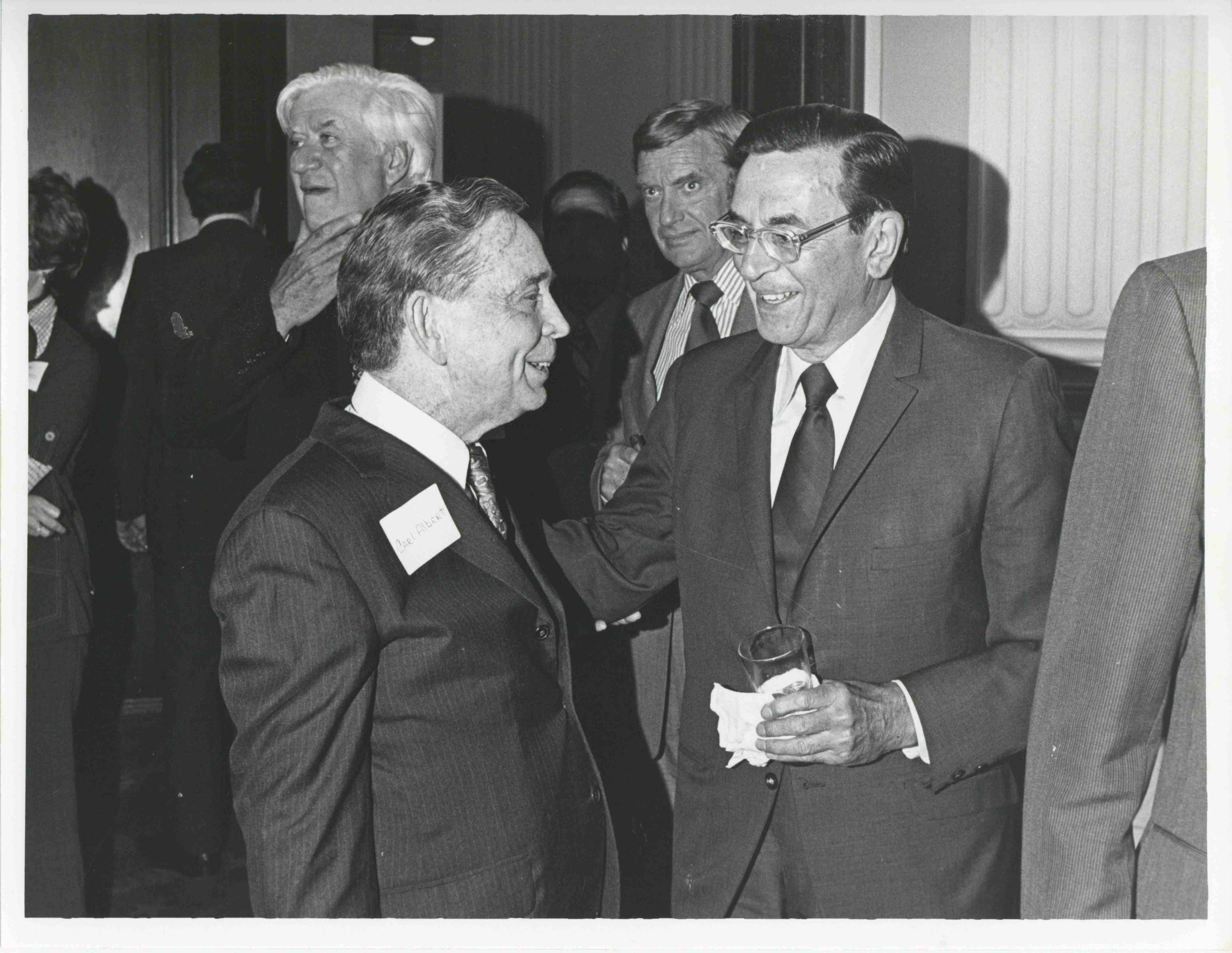
Edward Boland (right), author of the Boland Amendment

The Boland Amendment is a term describing a series of U.S. legislative amendments passed between 1982 and 1986, aimed at limiting U.S. government assistance to the Contras in Nicaragua. The Ronald Reagan administration supplied funding and military training to the Contras until revelations of human rights abuses led Congress to cut off aid through the Boland Amendment. The Boland Amendment was passed over a series of five legislative amendments that increasingly restricted forms of aids and the source of the aid.

The most significant effect of the Boland Amendment was the Iran–Contra affair, during which the Reagan Administration circumvented the Amendment in order to continue supplying arms to the Contras. This was achieved by funneling money to the Contras that was generated by secret arms sales to Iran. When revealed to the public, Congress attempted to prosecute Vice Admiral John M. Poindexter, U.S. Navy (USN), and his deputy, Lieutenant Colonel Oliver North, U.S. Marine Corps (USMC), for their direct role in the affair. President Ronald Reagan, while implicated, was not directly linked to the affair and avoided similar attempts at prosecution.

== Background ==
During the early years of the Reagan administration, a civil war raged in Nicaragua, pitting the communist revolutionary Sandinista government against Contra rebel groups. The civil war threatened United States influence in Nicaragua, a strategic location for the U.S. which had previously been used as a base for both the U.S. supported overthrow of Guatemalan President Jacobo Árbenz in 1954, and the Bay of Pigs invasion in 1961. The Reagan administration also wanted to control the spread of communism in Central America, since the Sandinistas had offered military assistance to Marxist rebels in El Salvador.

The Reagan Administration and the Central Intelligence Agency (CIA), led by William Casey, covertly supported the Contras through funding and military training. Public knowledge of routine human rights abuses committed by the Contra rebels led to the passage of the Boland Amendment by Congress, which cut off any appropriated funding for the Contras that would be used for the purpose of overthrowing the Nicaraguan government.

The Boland Amendment, proposed by Edward Boland, was a compromise because the Democrats did not have enough votes for a comprehensive ban. The Amendment gained traction due to widespread opposition among the American public to funding the Contras as opposition to funding the Contras hovered around two to one. It covered only appropriated funds spent by intelligence agencies (such as the CIA). Some of Reagan's national security officials used non-appropriated money spent by the National Security Council (NSC) to circumvent the Amendment. No court ever made a determination whether the Amendment covered the NSC. Supporters of the NSC actions claimed that the Boland Amendment violated the Constitution by violating the separation of powers principle, while opponents claimed that the Amendment passed in the constitutionally prescribed manner and the principle of separation of powers was not a legal defense. Congress later resumed aid to the Contras, totaling over $300 million. The Sandinistas were voted out of power in 1990 with the election of opposition leader Violeta Chamorro over the Sandinista candidate, Daniel Ortega.

The Boland Amendment prohibited the federal government from providing military support that would be used to overthrow the government of Nicaragua. It aimed to prevent CIA funding of rebels opposed to the revolutionary provisional junta. The Amendment sought to block Reagan administration support for the Contra rebels, but the amendment was narrowly interpreted by the Reagan administration to apply to only U.S. intelligence agencies, allowing the National Security Council (NSC), which is not labeled an intelligence agency, to channel funds to the Contra rebels. To block the funding through the NSC, the amendment was changed to prohibit any funds for military or paramilitary operations in the 1984 fiscal year.

== The Boland Amendment ==
The first Boland Amendment outlawed U.S. assistance from the CIA and Department of Defense (DOD), to the Contras for the purpose of overthrowing the communist Nicaraguan government, while allowing assistance for other purposes. The Amendment was part of the House Appropriations Bill of 1982, which was attached as a rider to the Defense Appropriations Act of 1983, named for the Massachusetts Democrat, Representative Edward Boland, who authored it. The House of Representatives passed the Defense Appropriations Act 411–0 on December 8, 1982, and it was signed by President Ronald Reagan on December 21, 1982.

"None of the funds provided in this Act may be used by Nicaragua and the Central Intelligence Agency or the Department of Defense to Honduras, furnish military equipment, military training or advice, or other support for military activities, to any group or individual, not part of a country's armed forces, for the purpose of overthrowing the Government of Nicaragua or provoking a military exchange between Nicaragua and Honduras." -Department of Defense Appropriation Act, 1983.

The four following legislative amendments adjusted the scope of the first Boland Amendment. The Intelligence Authorization Act, passed December 9, 1983, limited the existing obligations of the CIA and DOD to the Contras to $24 million and expanded the act to include direct or indirect support for any Nicaraguan group or individual. On October 3, 1984, aid was completely cut to the Contras and all entities of the United States government were prohibited from providing aid, expanding the prohibition from just the CIA and DOD. The fourth amendment, encompassing 1985-1986, provided $27 million in humanitarian aid to the Contras, and the fifth and final form of the amendment in June 1986, provided $100 million in aid to the Contras.

== Relationship to Iran-Contra Affair ==
Officials in the Reagan Administration argued that the Boland Amendment, or any act of Congress, could not interfere with the president's conduct of foreign policy. This represented the culmination of an ongoing struggle between Congress and the President over the power of foreign policy. Since the end of World War II, Congress had taken steps to curtail unilateral foreign policy moves by the President. Two clear examples of this are the 1973 War Powers Act, which required Congressional approval of troop commitments lasting longer than thirty days, and the 1974 Hughes-Ryan Amendment, which required a Presidential report to Congress concerning the necessity of all covert operations. The Boland Amendment represented another attempt by Congress to restrict Presidential power. The resistance of the Reagan administration via its circumvention was the flip-side of this power struggle.

In this spirit, administration officials argued that the Boland Amendment, or any act of Congress, could not interfere with the president's conduct of foreign policy by restricting funds, as the president could seek funds from private entities or foreign governments. In this spirit, and despite the Boland Amendment, Vice Admiral John M. Poindexter, USN, and his deputy, Lieutenant Colonel Oliver North, USMC, secretly diverted to the Nicaraguan contras millions of dollars in funds received from a secret deal that some alleged had explicit presidential approval – the sales of anti-tank and anti-aircraft missiles to Iran in spite of Reagan's public pledge not to deal with terrorists.

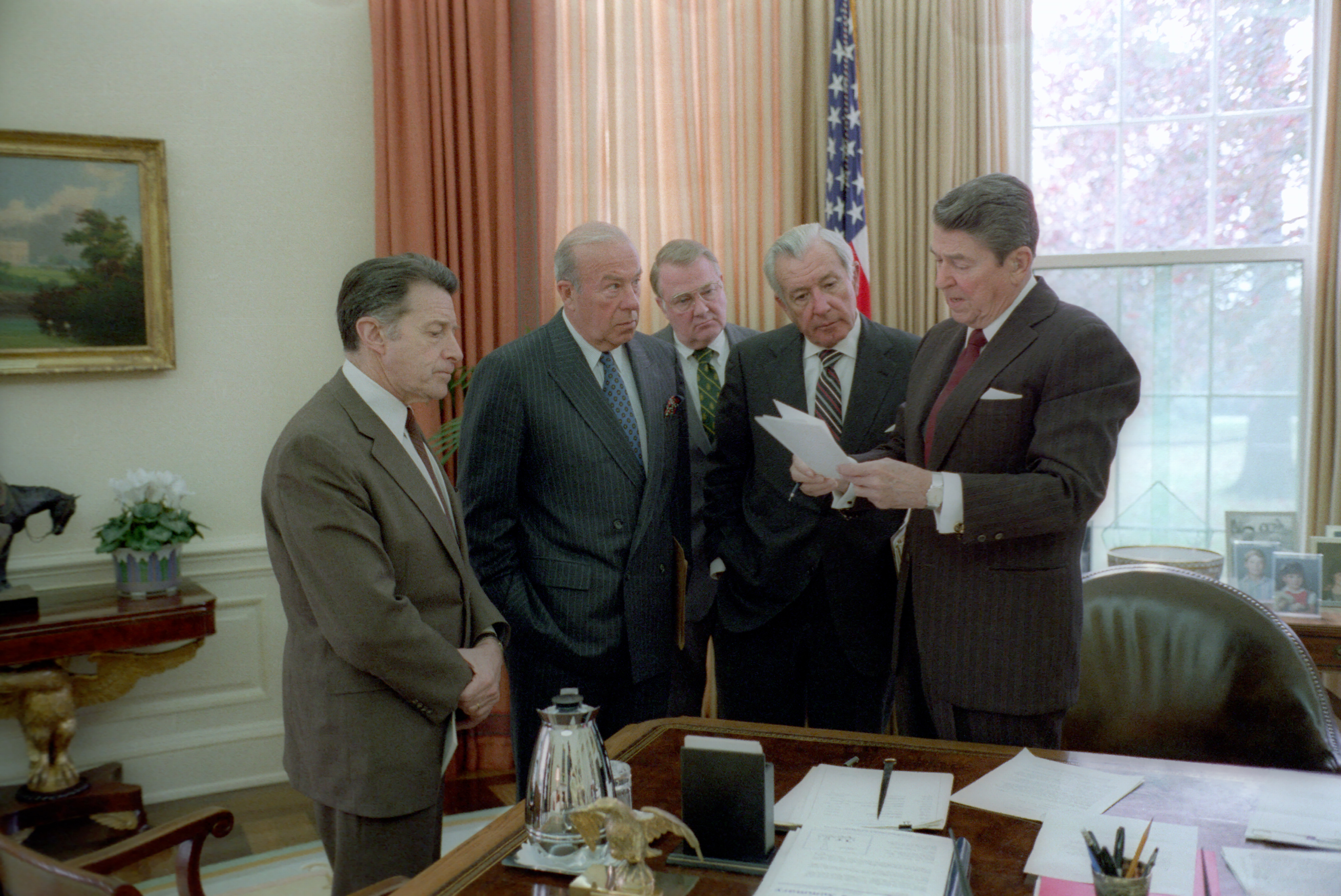
President Ronald Reagan (Far Right), discusses his remarks on the Iran-Contra Affair while in the Oval Office.

On Monday, November 3rd 1986, a pro-Syrian newspaper in Lebanon, Ash-Shiraa, revealed the secret deal to the world and The New York Times picked it up a day later on Tuesday, US election day. This came as Democrats won back control of the Senate in the 1986 elections. In public hearings of a joint House–Senate committee convened for purposes of investigating the affair, Democrats sought to prosecute North for his role. The final majority report published on November 18, 1987 blamed Reagan's passive style of leadership for allowing the conduct of foreign policy without involvement of any elected official, affirming that “It is [the President’s] responsibility to communicate unambiguously to his subordinates that they must keep him advised of important actions they take for the Administration”.

== Legislature chronology ==
A chronology from John Negroponte.

In December 1982 H.J.RES.631 became public law 97-377 making further continuing appropriations for the fiscal year 1983. The amendment S.UP.AMDT.1542 by Senator Daniel Patrick Moynihan, which aimed to prohibit the use of funds by the CIA or DOD to support military activities in Nicaragua, fell. Amendment S.UP.AMDT.1541 by Senator Christopher J. Dodd "to declare Congressional support for restrictions on certain types of operations in Central America" was tabled.

But H.R.7355 made appropriations for the Department of Defense and amendment H.AMDT.974 to it by Representative Edward P. Boland passed with a recorded vote of 411–0 to prohibit the CIA or Defense Department to use the funds of the bill for military purposes in Nicaragua.

In December 1983, for the fiscal year 1984, H.R.4185, sponsored by Representative Joseph P. Addabbo, which became public law 98-212, and H.R.2968, sponsored by Boland, which became public law 98-215, limited the amount to be spent for military purposes in Nicaragua. Amendment H.AMDT.461 by Boland to H.R. 2968 prohibited covert assistance for military operations in Nicaragua.

In December 1984, for fiscal year 1985, H.J.RES.648, became public law 98-473, and prohibited funds available to the CIA and the DOD from being used in Nicaragua for military purposes. This legislation read: "During fiscal year 1985, no funds available to the Central Intelligence Agency, the Department of Defense, or any other agency or entity of the United States involved in intelligence activities may be obligated or expended for the purpose or which would have the effect of supporting, directly or indirectly, military or paramilitary operations in Nicaragua by any nation, group, organization, movement or individual." This legislation also provided that after February 28, 1985, if the President made a report to Congress specifying certain criteria, including the need to provide further assistance for "military or paramilitary operations" prohibited by this statute, he could expend $14 million in funds if Congress passed a joint resolution approving such action."

In December 1985, for fiscal year 1986, S.960 became public law 99-83 and also excluded military use for funds to be spent in Nicaragua.

== See also ==
- Iran–Contra affair
- Clark Amendment
- Nicaragua v. United States
