= Paul S. Cutter =

- Born: October 9, 1937 (age 88); Iowa, United States
- Other name: Paul Sjeklocha
- Criminal charges: Selling arms to Iran
- Penalty: Five years in prison

Paul S. Cutter, also known as Paul Sjeklocha (born October 9, 1937, in Iowa, USA), is an American publisher who was convicted by a US court of selling arms to Iran. He was described by The New York Times in 1987 as "a former American diplomatic official who had worked for the United States Information Agency in Moscow and served for 11 years as a researcher and translator for the Central Intelligence Agency".

== Career ==
In the 1960s Cutter worked for the United States Information Agency in Moscow, and subsequently worked for the Central Intelligence Agency for 11 years as analyst and translator. Sjeklocha told a former employer that in the 1970s he had worked for the CIA in Moscow helping dissidents to leave the country. In 1976 Cutter was detained in Yugoslavia on suspicion of spying for the US Government, and held for four and a half years.

In 1982 Sjeklocha visited Israel as a journalist on a tour sponsored by JINSA in which ex-Defense Intelligence Agency chief Eugene F. Tighe also participated. Sjeklocha became a member of JINSA's Board of Advisors the following year. According to JINSA, the two were added to the tour at the request of the Israeli Embassy in Washington, D.C. The tour met Defense Minister Ariel Sharon and other Israeli defense personnel, and produced generally favourable coverage of Israel, with some of Sjeklocha's work re-published in the Pentagon's "Current News" newsletter. Harry V. Martin, a former editor of one of Sjeklocha's magazines, Military Electronics/Countermeasures, told Knight-Ridder in 1985 that Sjeklocha had returned from the tour with a scheme to sell weapons captured by Israel in Lebanon, telling the editor that he had been asked to be the agent for the sale. The editor protested that Sjeklocha's European Defense Associates was a publishing company and not an arms dealership, and despite Sjeklocha having an array of photographs of the captured arms, that was the last the editor knew of it. The scheme (apparently without Sjeklocha's involvement) later became Operation Tipped Kettle, with the arms sold to the US at minimal cost (essentially shipping and handling fees) for supply to the Nicaraguan Contras.

In December 1983 Cutter joined forces with Colonel Ralph Mark Broman, Paris chief of the Office of Defense Cooperation until July 31, 1984, becoming manager of European Defense Associates' Paris branch in March and chairman and 50% shareholder of the company in August. Cutter also made Broman editor of two of his magazines. Two arms dealers told The New York Times in 1987 that potential deals with Iran were discussed with Broman in his office before his retirement.

In August 1985 Sjeklocha, owner and President of European Defense Associates, was one of seven charged with conspiracy to sell arms to Iran, including 1,104 TOW anti-tank missiles and 10 F-4 engines. Sjeklocha, the company, and one other person were convicted in December 1985, while the remaining five were acquitted on the grounds that Sjeklocha had led them to believe he was acting with government sanction. According to the Orlando Sentinel, "Several of those defendants contended that Cutter claimed to be a U.S. intelligence officer who had secret approval from the Pentagon and the government`s Office of Defense Cooperation in Paris to arrange the weapons shipments. They also said Cutter had close ties to Israeli defense officials." Sjeklocha was sentenced to five years in prison.

== Books ==
- (with Igor Mead) Unofficial Art in the Soviet Union, University of California Press, 1967
