= Tower Commission =

1986–87 U.S. presidential commission

President's Special Review Board ("Tower Commission")
- Formation: December 1, 1986
- Dissolved: February 27, 1987 (report published)
- Purpose: "a comprehensive study of the future role and procedures of the National Security Council (N.S.C.) staff in the development, coordination, oversight and conduct of foreign and national security policy."
- Location: Washington, D.C.
- Chairman: John Tower
- Staff: 23

The Tower Commission was a United States presidential commission established on December 1, 1986, by President Ronald Reagan in response to the Iran–Contra affair (in which senior administration officials secretly facilitated the sale of arms to Iran, which was the subject of an arms embargo). The commission, composed of former senator John Tower of Texas, former secretary of state Edmund Muskie, and former national security advisor Brent Scowcroft, was tasked with reviewing the proper role of the National Security Council staff in national security operations generally, and in the arms transfers to Iran specifically.

The Commission's report, published on February 27, 1987, concluded that CIA director William Casey, who supported the Iran-Contra arrangement, should have taken over the operation and made the president aware of the risks and notified Congress as legally required. The Commission's work was continued by two congressional investigative committees (both formed in January 1987).

== Process ==
The Commission report described its purpose in the following way:

The President directed the board to examine the proper role of the National Security Council staff in national security operations, including the arms transfers to Iran. The President made clear that he wanted all the facts to come out. The board was not, however, called upon to assess individual culpability or be the final arbiter of the facts. These tasks have been properly left to others. Indeed, the short deadline set by the President for completion of the board's work and its limited resources precluded a separate and thorough field investigation. Instead, the board has examined the events surrounding the transfer of arms to Iran as a principal case study in evaluating the operation of the National Security Council in general and the role of the N.S.C. staff in particular.

Because of its limited mandate, the Commission had no powers to subpoena documents, compel testimony, or grant immunity from prosecution. Over the course of several weeks, the Commission took testimony from 86 witnesses, and was able to retrieve backup copies from an NSC mainframe of some files which NSC staff had sought to delete. There was some debate about whether to publish the Commission's detailed chronology of events, but with the removal of some details of sourcing, methods and names of contacts, it was ultimately published as an annex to the Commission's report.

== Report ==
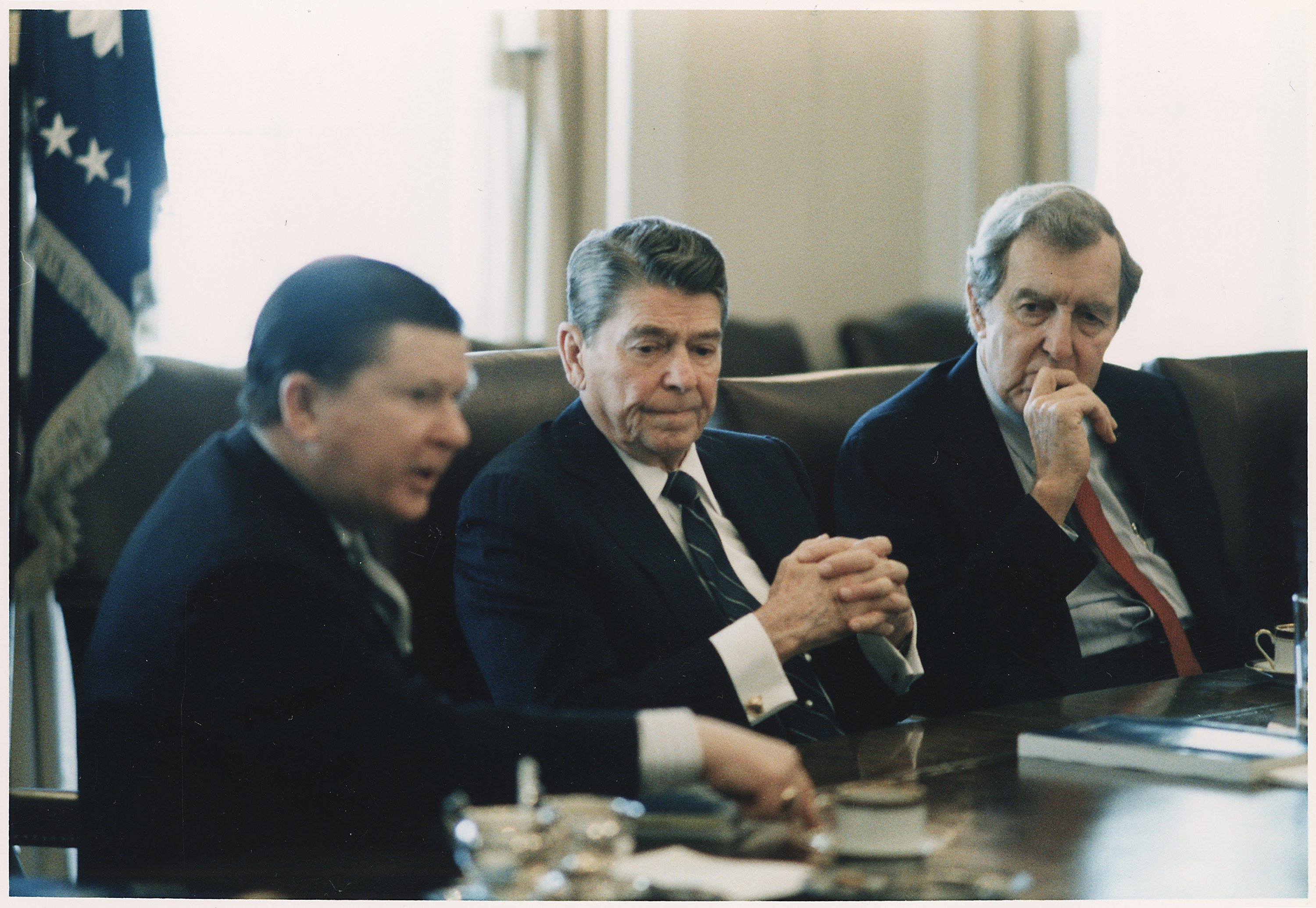
President Ronald Reagan (center) receives the Tower Commission Report regarding the Iran-Contra affair in the Cabinet Room with John Tower (left) and Edmund Muskie (right)

Issued on February 26, 1987, the commission's report "held Reagan accountable for a lax managerial style and aloofness from policy detail."

Oliver North, John Poindexter, Caspar Weinberger, and others were also implicated.

Summarised, the main findings showed that "Using the Contras as a front, and against international law, and US law, weapons were sold, using Israel as intermediaries, to Iran, during the brutal Iran–Iraq War. The US was also supplying weapons to Iraq, including ingredients for nerve gas, mustard gas and other chemical weapons."

Appendix B of the report opens with the line attributed to Juvenal, "Quis custodiet ipsos custodes?" ("Who watches the watchmen?").

== Responses ==
President Ronald Reagan issued a primetime address on March 4, 1987, addressing the report's conclusions. Some individuals named in the report complained about how they were portrayed.
