= Edward Boland =

American politician (1911–2001)

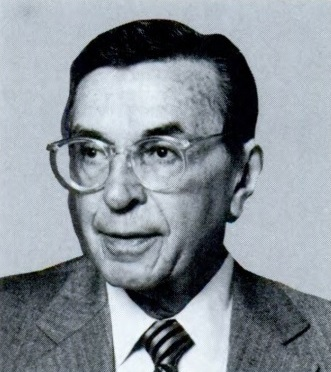

Member of the U.S. House of Representatives from Massachusetts's 2nd district
- In office January 3, 1953 – January 3, 1989
- Preceded by: Foster Furcolo
- Succeeded by: Richard Neal

Chair of the House Intelligence Committee
- In office July 14, 1977 – January 3, 1985
- Preceded by: Otis G. Pike
- Succeeded by: Lee H. Hamilton

Register of Deeds of Hampden County
- In office 1941–1952
- Preceded by: C. Wesley Hale
- Succeeded by: John P. Lynch

Member of the Massachusetts House of Representatives from the 4th Hampden district
- In office January 2, 1935 – January 1, 1941
- Preceded by: Edward M. Cawley
- Succeeded by: Eugene J. Sweeney

Personal details
- Born: Edward Patrick Boland; October 1, 1911 Springfield, Massachusetts, U.S.
- Died: November 4, 2001 (aged 90) Springfield, Massachusetts, U.S.
- Party: Democratic
- Spouse: Mary Egan
- Children: 4
- Education: Bay Path University; Boston College
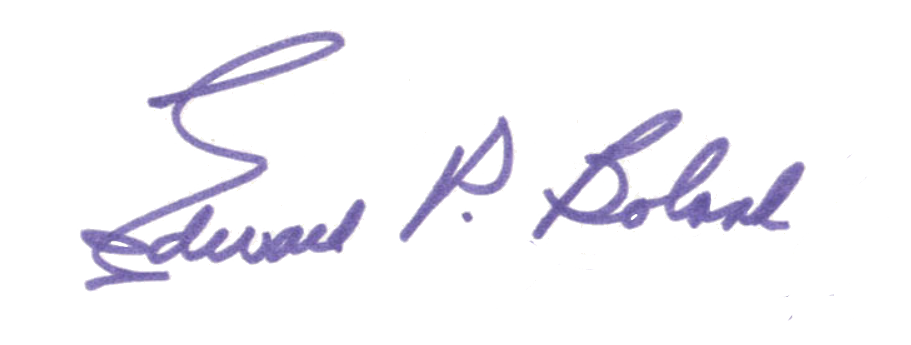
- Signature

Military service
- Allegiance: United States
- Branch/service: United States Army
- Years of service: 1942–1946
- Rank: Captain
- Battles/wars: World War II
- Edward Boland's voice Boland questions Caspar Weinberger during the Iran–Contra hearings Recorded August 3, 1987

Edward Patrick Boland (October 1, 1911 – November 4, 2001) was an American politician from the Commonwealth of Massachusetts. A Democrat, he was a representative from Massachusetts's 2nd congressional district.

== Early life and education ==
Boland's father was an Irish immigrant railroad worker. Boland was born in Springfield, Massachusetts and graduated from Springfield Central High School in 1928. He attended Bay Path Institute and Boston College Law School.

== Military service ==
He served in the United States Army during World War II.

== Political career ==
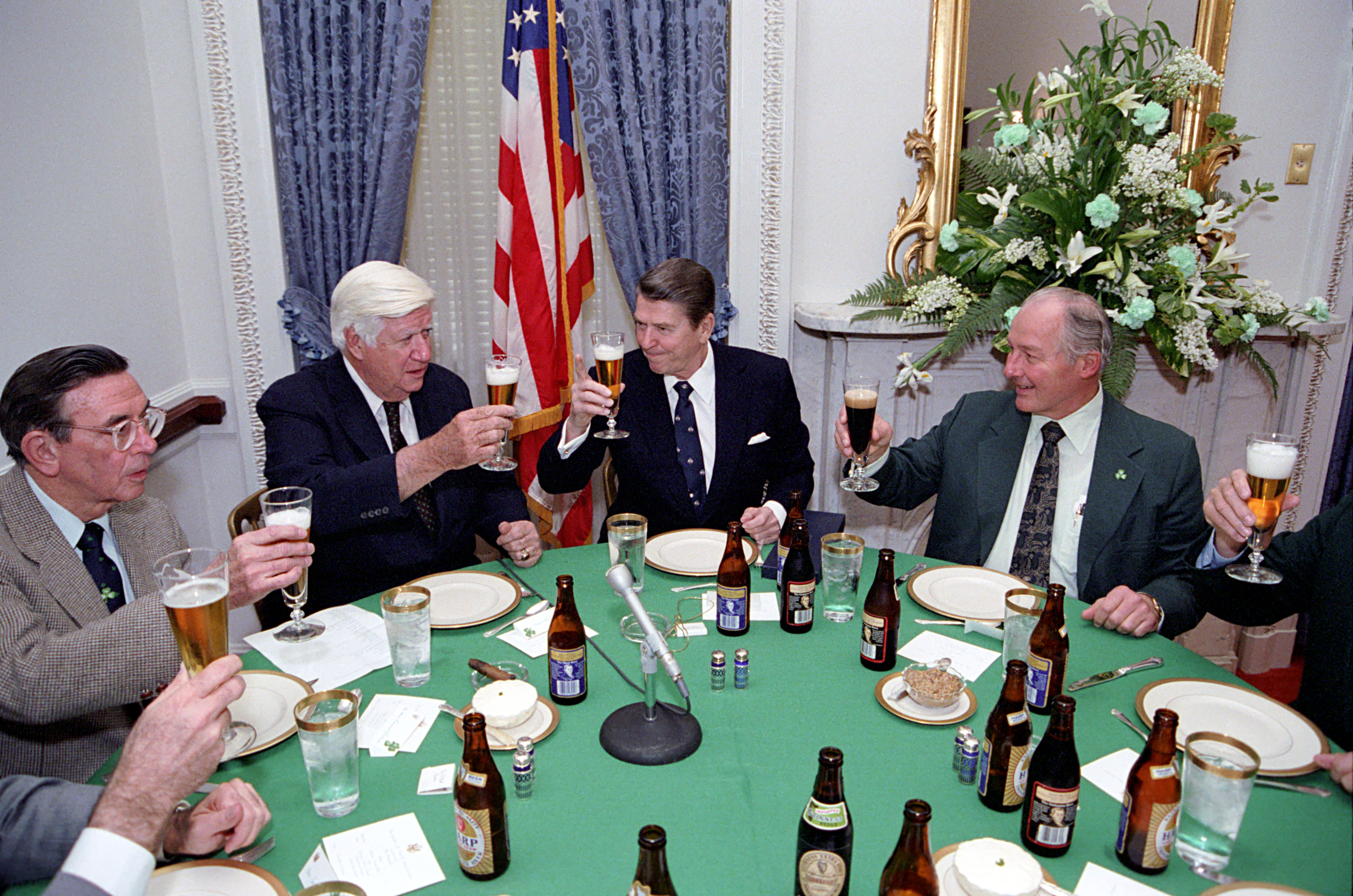
President Ronald Reagan attending a St. Patrick's Day luncheon hosted by Speaker Tip O'Neill, House Minority Leader Robert H. Michel, and Boland

He was a member of the Massachusetts House of Representatives from 1939 to 1940 and was the Hampden County register of deeds from 1941 to 1952.

Boland was elected to the United States House of Representatives as a Democrat in 1952. Congressman Boland was in office during the closing of the Springfield Armory in 1968, and was harshly criticized for his inability to prevent its closure. This failure resulted in a challenge to Boland in 1968 by Springfield Mayor Charles V. Ryan. Boland was re-elected handily with significant help from the family of U.S. Senator Ted Kennedy in what was to be the last challenge to Boland by a major contender. Boland's most famous work as a congressman was the 1982 Boland Amendment, which blocked certain funding of the Contras in Nicaragua after the Central Intelligence Agency had supervised acts of sabotage without notifying Congress. Boland lived in a Washington apartment with fellow Massachusetts Congressman Tip O'Neill (whose wife remained in Massachusetts) until 1977.

Boland announced in April 1988 that he would not run for a 19th term later that year; he never lost an election in 50 years as an elected official. Earlier, he'd tipped off Springfield mayor Richard Neal about his pending retirement, allowing Neal to get a significant head start in fundraising. Neal would be unopposed for the Democratic nomination–the real contest in this heavily Democratic district–and has held this seat, now numbered as the 1st district, ever since.

== Personal life and death ==
Boland married at the age of 62, fathering four children. Boland died in 2001 at the age of 90 from natural causes.

== See also ==
- 1935–1936 Massachusetts legislature
- 1937–1938 Massachusetts legislature
- 1939 Massachusetts legislature
