= Alan Fiers =

American CIA officer (born 1939)

Alan Dale Fiers Jr. (born 15 April 1939) is an American former Central Intelligence Agency (CIA) officer, who served as President Ronald Reagan's chief of the CIA's Central American Task Force from October 1984 until his retirement in 1988. Fiers gained attention for his role in the Iran–Contra affair. Fiers would later plead guilty to two misdemeanor counts of withholding information from Congress but served no prison time.

== Early life ==
Alan Fiers Jr. was born in Ohio to a family led by an evangelical Christian minister. He attended Thomas Carr Howe Community High School in Indianapolis and was the most valuable player on the football team. He played tackle and guard for Ohio State University on several title-contending teams coached by Woody Hayes. Fiers was a starter for the 1960 team, playing both offense and defense. His tenacity so impressed Hayes that Hayes kept him as an assistant coach for the 1961 National Championship Team.

== Military service ==
Alan Fiers joined the Marine Corps while still in college on 18 December 1958, and was commissioned as a Second lieutenant on 7 June 1961. He was promoted to First lieutenant on 7 December 1962. Fiers was serving at Camp Lejeune by 1965, when President Lyndon B. Johnson ordered his battalion, the 1st Battalion, 8th Marines, along with other infantry battalions of the 2nd Marine Division, to the Dominican Republic to curb civil unrest as part of Operation Power Pack. There, The Indianapolis Star-News reported, that Fiers and two other marines crashed a Jeep through barricades under heavy gunfire to rescue a wounded civilian, for which, he was decorated with a Bronze Star for heroic achievement and a Purple Heart for wounds received in action.

== Central Intelligence Agency ==
Following his service in the Marines, Fiers went home to Indiana and earned a degree in physical education, readying himself to coach football. His coaching career was not to be; however, and by 1969 he was under diplomatic cover by the Central Intelligence Agency (CIA). His postings included Istanbul and Ankara, Turkey, followed by Karachi, Pakistan. By 1981, Fiers, whose alias in clandestine matters was "Cliff Grubbs", had risen to the coveted post of Station chief in Riyadh, Saudi Arabia. While with the CIA, he was awarded the Intelligence Medal of Merit, the Meritorious Officer Award and the Distinguished Officer Award.

== Iran–Contra Affair ==
In 1984 he had been picked to command a group involved in the agency's undercover war against the Communist government in Afghanistan, but it wasn't to be. Instead, he was given the job of Chief of Central American Task Force, with the primary mission of supporting the Contras. After succeeding Duane Clarridge, he assumed a major responsibility for support of the Nicaraguan Contras' armed opposition to the Sandinista's Soviet-backed, Communist government. In this capacity, Fiers became aware of Lt. Col. Oliver North's efforts to circumvent congressional limitations on aid to the rebel forces. Fiers was known for wholeheartedly supporting Adolfo Calero and Enrique Bermúdez against so-called reformers like Arturo Cruz and Alfonso Robelo. He clashed with the State Department's Elliott Abrams, who supported Cruz and Robelo.

Fiers became party to the Lawrence Walsh investigation. Walsh determined that Fiers had knowledge of North's activities, and participated in concealing it from congressional investigators. On July 9, 1991, Fiers pleaded guilty to two misdemeanor counts of withholding information from the Congress regarding secret efforts to aid the Nicaraguan Contra rebels. in return for immunity from further prosecution.

He was sentenced to one year probation and 100 hours community service by US District Chief Judge Aubrey Eugene Robinson Jr. on January 31, 1992.

On December 24, 1992, Fiers was pardoned by President George H. W. Bush, along with Caspar W. Weinberger, Duane R. Clarridge, Clair E. George, Elliott Abrams and Robert C. McFarlane.

== Later life ==
Fiers retired from the C.I.A. in 1988, to join W. R. Grace & Company, a multinational concern, in Washington.

== See also ==
- List of people pardoned or granted clemency by the president of the United States
