= Duane Clarridge =

CIA operations officer (1932–2016)

- Born: Duane Ramsdell Clarridge; April 16, 1932; Nashua, New Hampshire
- Died: April 9, 2016 (aged 83); Leesburg, Virginia
- Other name: Dewey
- Education: Brown University
- Occupation: Intelligence officer
- Parent(s): Duane Herbert Clarridge; Alice Scott Ramsdale
- Espionage activity
- Allegiance: United States
- Service branch: Central Intelligence Agency
- Service years: 1955–1991
- Rank: Senior operations officer

Duane Ramsdell "Dewey" Clarridge (April 16, 1932 – April 9, 2016) was an American senior operations officer for the Central Intelligence Agency (CIA) and supervisor for more than 30 years. At various points, he had been stationed in Nepal, India, Turkey and Italy and Nicaragua. Clarridge was the chief of the Latin American division from 1981 to 1987 and a key figure in the Iran-Contra Affair. Clarridge pleaded not guilty to seven counts of perjury and making false statements relating to 1985 shipment to Iran.

== Biography ==
=== Early life ===
Clarridge was born into a "staunchly Republican family" in Nashua, New Hampshire. His father was Duane Herbert Clarridge, and his mother was Alice Scott Ramsdale. Duane Herbert Clarridge worked as a dentist and he remained a staunch conservative the rest of his life. Duane Ramsdell Clarridge went to the private college preparatory Peddie School for high school, and then went to Brown University. For graduate school he went to Columbia University's Graduate School of International Affairs and joined the CIA in 1955.

=== CIA career ===
According to his memoirs, he was first stationed in Nepal from 1958 to 1960, then India from 1960 to 1964, then the USA from 1964 to 1968, and then Turkey from 1968 to 1973.

He then through the ranks of the CIA in "a normal career pattern up to the late 70s", (as quoted in an interview he gave to CNN's Cold War Episodes program), being chief of the CIA station in Istanbul, where he maintained close contacts with the Counter-Guerrilla, the Turkish stay-behind anti-communist organization. He transferred to Rome before becoming chief of the Latin America division in 1981. According to The New York Times, "[f]rom his days running secret wars for the C.I.A. in Central America to his consulting work in the 1990s on a plan to insert Special Operations troops in Iraq to oust Saddam Hussein, Mr. Clarridge has been an unflinching cheerleader for American intervention overseas."

During his three-year tenure, he directed several of the CIA's more notorious operations in Latin America, including the 1984 mining of Nicaraguan harbors, an act for which the United States was convicted in a 1986 World Court case at the Hague (Nicaragua v. United States). When asked about his role in the mining, Clarridge was open about his involvement but downplayed the severity of the covert operation: "So we decided to go big time for the economics alright... So I was sitting at home one night, frankly having a glass of gin, and I said you know the mines has gotta be the solution. I knew we had 'em, we'd made 'em outta sewer pipe and we had the good fusing system on them and we were ready. And you know they wouldn't really hurt anybody because they just weren't that big a mine, alright? Yeah, with luck, bad luck we might hurt somebody, but pretty hard you know?"

Clarridge was also instrumental in organizing and recruiting Contra forces to overthrow Nicaragua's leftist Sandinista government. Clarridge used aliases such as "Dewey Maroni" during these operations. He described the early Contra force as "about 500... some of them were former members of the Nicaraguan National Guard (whose leader Anastasio Somoza Debayle had been overthrown by the Sandinistas in 1979), or a lot of them were just you know peasants from the mountainous areas between Honduras and Nicaragua who had been at war with somebody, forever. And in many respects they were like a bunch of cattle rustlers. Bandits. Not bandits, they weren't robbing people but they were doing the things they do in that area." But, Clarridge maintained, by the end of the conflict, the Contras numbered more than 20,000 peasants due less to the CIA's efforts than to the Sandinistas' attempts at reeducation and land redistribution.

Clarridge defended the overthrow of democratically elected governments, specifically the Allende government in Chile saying "We'll intervene whenever we decide it's in our national security interests to intervene. Get used to it, world – we're not going to put up with nonsense."

He admitted to the House Intelligence Committee staff in a secret briefing in 1984 that the Contras were routinely murdering "civilians and Sandinista officials in the provinces as; well as heads of cooperatives, nurses, doctors and judges". But he claimed that this did not violate President Reagan's executive order prohibiting assassinations because the agency defined it as just 'killing'. "After all, this is war—a paramilitary operation," Clarridge said in conclusion.

In 1984, he became chief of the European Division of the CIA, where he ran a successful "counterterrorist" operation. Later, with the support of CIA director William Casey, he set up a Counterterrorist Center that operated out of Langley, Virginia.

=== Iran-Contra affair ===
Clarridge has said that he had no involvement in the later illegal diversion of funds to the Contras. Clarridge was indicted in November 1991 on seven counts of perjury and false statements. On Christmas Eve 1992 in the waning hours of his presidency, George H. W. Bush pardoned Clarridge before his trial could finish. At the same time, Bush pardoned five of Clarridge's associates in the Iran–Contra affair including former Defense Secretary Caspar Weinberger, Elliott Abrams, a former assistant secretary of state for Inter-American affairs; former National Security Advisor Robert McFarlane; and former CIA employees Alan Fiers and Clair George. The final version of the Walsh Report concluded that "there was strong evidence that Clarridge's testimony was false."

=== Post-CIA career ===
Clarridge operated a "private spying operation ... from poolside at his home near San Diego." Colleagues said that Clarridge viewed the CIA "largely with contempt." He has "likened his operation, called the Eclipse Group, to the Office of Strategic Services, the C.I.A.’s World War II precursor."

In November 2015, Trip Gabriel of The New York Times reported that Clarridge was a top adviser to the Ben Carson presidential campaign on terrorism and national security. Clarridge was quoted as indicating that Carson struggled to grasp foreign policy, and could not grasp “one iota of intelligent information about the Middle East.” The Carson campaign released a statement charging the Times with taking advantage of "an elderly gentleman." Carson subsequently replied: "He's not my adviser. He is not my adviser. He is a person who has come in on a couple of our sessions to offer his opinions about what was going on... To call himself my adviser would be a great stretch, and he has no idea who else I'm sitting down and talking to."

Clarridge died at the age of 83, a week short of his 84th birthday in Leesburg, Virginia, on April 9, 2016, from complications of esophageal cancer. Shortly after his death, Newsweek published an article by Nicholas Schou claiming that the former CIA operations officer and Iran-Contra figure had previously told him that the 1980 October Surprise theory as depicted in George Cave's novel, October 1980, was "really true." Schou noted that Cave denied actually believing that officials working on behalf of Reagan plotted to delay the release of the hostages.

== Media appearances ==
Clarridge was interviewed by John Pilger in his film "The War on Democracy" released in 2007. The interview was also highlighted by American journalist Glenn Greenwald on his YouTube channel in 2022.

== Works ==
- A Spy For All Seasons: My Life in the CIA (1997)

== See also ==
- Operation Gladio
- Operation Charly
- List of people pardoned or granted clemency by the president of the United States
