= George W. Cave =

American CIA agent (1929–2026)

George William Cave
- Born: August 6, 1929; Camden, New Jersey, U.S.
- Died: August 14, 2026 (aged 97); Olney, Maryland, U.S.
- Education: Princeton University
- Spouse: Joan Barbara McCarthy (m. 1955; died 2026)
- Children: 6
- Espionage activity
- Allegiance: United States
- Service branch: Directorate of Operations (CIA)

George William Cave (August 6, 1929 – August 14, 2026) was an American CIA operations officer and authority on Iran who later reluctantly took part in the Iran–Contra affair at the behest of CIA Director William J. Casey.

== Early life and education ==
Cave was born in Camden, New Jersey, on August 6, 1929. He attended Milton Hershey School where he graduated in 1947 and was named Alumnus of the Year in 2001. He majored in Middle Eastern studies at Princeton University, where he studied from 1952 to 1956, and joined CIA after graduation.

== Career ==
One account claims Cave served the CIA in Tehran during the 1953 Iranian coup d'état that restored the Shah of Iran to power but he has since indicated he did not join the agency until October 1956. In the mid-1970s he served in Tehran as deputy CIA station chief, with personal ties to the Shah. His agency-given pseudonym in the late 1970s was "Joseph Adlesick." In the series "Documents from the U.S. Espionage Den" he is referred to in volumes 10, 17, 38, 55 and 56. In October 1979, he gave a briefing in Tehran to Abbas Amir-Entezam and Ebrahim Yazdi, based on intelligence from the IBEX system, that Iraq was preparing to invade.

By 1977, when he was working in Jeddah, he had six children, three of whom were in college.

== Iran-Contra Affair ==
In March 1986, at the behest of CIA Director William J. Casey, Cave joined the unofficial, but presidentially approved, covert operation to provide American-made missiles to the Islamic Republic of Iran that constituted part of the Iran-Contra affair. The weapons sales were part of a deal that was supposed to include the release of several American citizens being held hostage in Lebanon by Hezbollah, a close ally of Iran. Cave was one of the participants who hoped that the operation would also eventually lead to improved U.S. and Israeli political relations with the Iranian regime. Over several months, he served as an Iran expert, Persian-English interpreter, and sometime negotiator, in numerous meetings with Iranian representatives in Europe and Washington, D.C. In May 1986 he was part of the delegation that traveled clandestinely to Tehran in hopes of meeting with senior Iranian officials. In November 1986, an exposé of the Tehran mission in a Lebanese news magazine brought the secret deals to an abrupt halt.

In the aftermath of the scandal, in-depth probes by Congress and an Office of Independent Counsel focused intently on Cave's role but generally concluded he had not played a fundamental role. He had been brought in at the CIA director's insistence, had not been aware of all of the plans or tactics of the main actors (such as manipulating weapons pricing), and had objected to the involvement of Iranian arms dealer Manucher Ghorbanifar. His depositions to congressional investigators and testimony in legal proceedings, such as at the trial of senior CIA official Clair George, provided important factual information about the operations and the roles of various NSC, CIA, and other players.

== Personal life and death ==
Cave married Joan Barbara McCarthy (1931–2026) in 1955; the couple had six children.

Cave died in Olney, Maryland, on August 14, 2026, at the age of 97.

== Published novel ==
Cave published his first novel, October 1980 in December 2013. In his final interview Duane Clarridge, former CIA operations officer and Iran-Contra figure, hinted that this novel was a largely accurate depiction of how Reagan's October Surprise transpired.

== Selected works ==
- Cave, George W. (1972). Sufi Poetry. Rawalpindi: R.C.D. Cultural Association.
- Cave, George W. (1975). "Personal observations on changes in Iran between 1958 and 1975".
- Cave, George W. (2013). October 1980. CreateSpace Independent Publishing Platform. ISBN 978-1-4827-8213-4.
- Cave, George W. (2017). The Seat of the Scornful: A Second Chance. CreateSpace Independent Publishing Platform. ISBN 978-1540503893.
