= Amiram Nir =

Israeli journalist

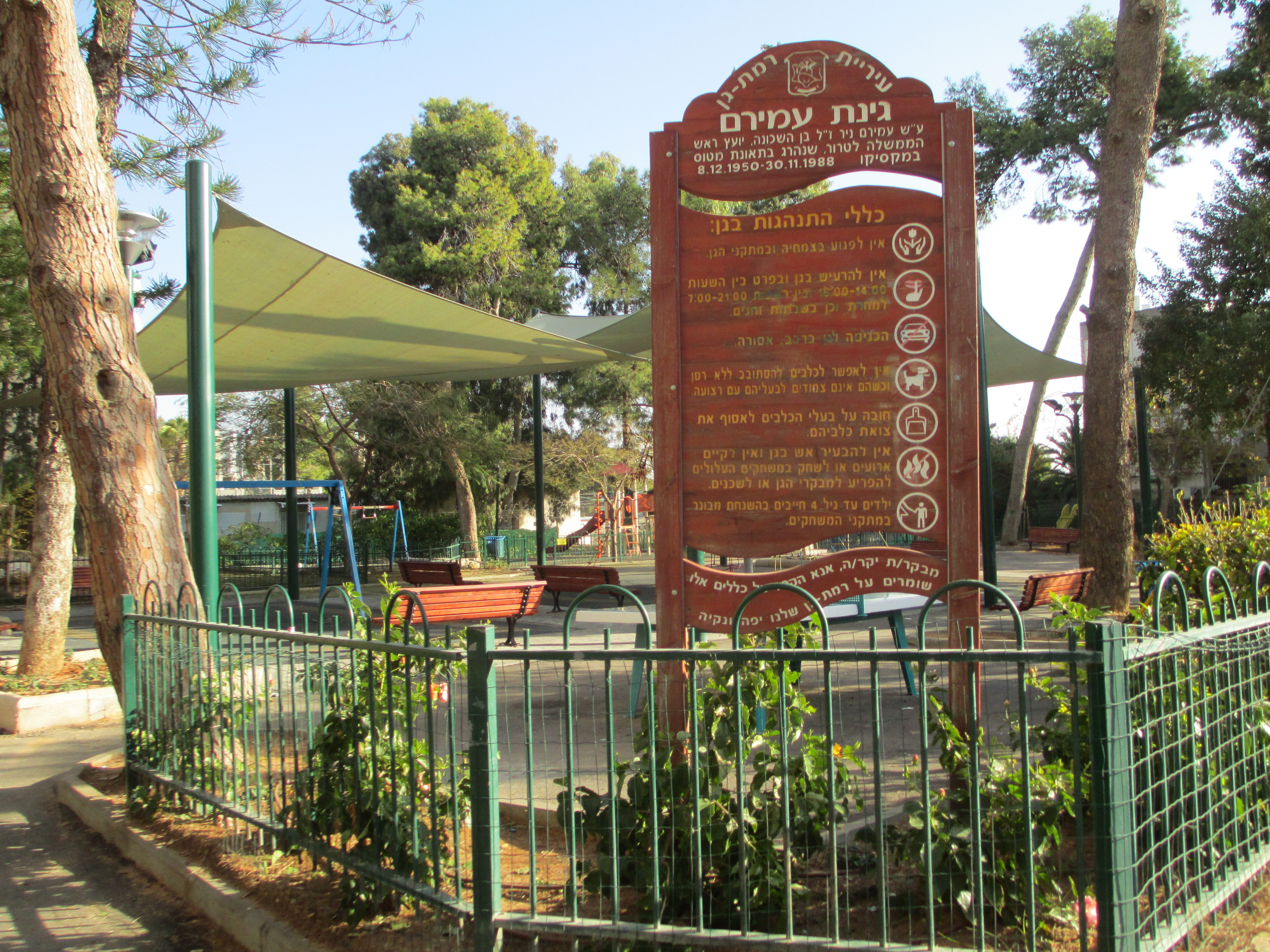
Amiram's garden in Ramat Gan

Amiram Nir (Hebrew: עמירם ניר; 8 December 1950 – 30 November 1988) was an Israeli journalist. He had also been a terrorism advisor to two Israeli prime ministers, and played a role in the Iran–Contra affair. He married Judy Shalom Nir-Mozes in 1982.

== Career ==
Nir served as Shimon Peres' campaign manager in 1977 and as party spokesman for Peres' party. He subsequently became a correspondent for Israeli television, and in 1982 was military correspondent for Channel One. He also rose to the rank of lieutenant colonel in the Israel Defense Forces reserves.

In November 1984 Nir was appointed to the new post of counterterrorism advisor under Prime Minister Shimon Peres, remaining in the position under Peres' successor Yitzhak Shamir. In the position of Counter-terrorism Advisor Nir played a key role in the Israeli response to the 1985 Achille Lauro hijacking.

Nir also played a role in the Iran–Contra affair. When the matter became public in late 1986 he was forbidden by the Israeli government from speaking to US authorities. He resigned from the Israeli government in March 1987, after public criticism of his role in the affair (and with his US contact Oliver North attempting to pin the blame on Nir) made him feel "neutralized of his authority". In mid-1988 Nir spoke to Bob Woodward of The Washington Post, saying that he was considering how best to sell the Irangate story.

== Death and conspiracy theory ==
On November 30, 1988, the Cessna T210 that Nir was traveling in crashed during an attempted emergency landing in Michoacán, Mexico after one the plane's engine failed during a flight from Uruapan to Mexico City. Nir and one other passenger, Pedro Espinoza Hurtado, were killed instantly in the crash; the pilot, Guillermo Cuahonte, and a third passenger, Adriana Stanton, sustained serious injuries to their heads and bodies. Nir's body was tentatively identified by the passport on his body containing the name "Amiram Nir Nisker". His body was also identified in the crash wreckage by Pedro Curchet, an Argentinian associate of Nir who worked for the avocado-exporting venture, Eupasa. Officials initially reported that Nir and Stanton had registered for the flight under an assumed name, but this was later reported not to have been true. Nir was buried in Kiryat Shaul Cemetery in Tel Aviv.

Given his connections to the Iran–Contra scandal, Nir's death sparked conspiracy theories that he was murdered to prevent him from revealing embarrassing details about then-President-elect of the United States George H. W. Bush. In his 2008 book The Secret War with Iran, Ronen Bergman said that after Nir's death there was an organized effort of burglaries targeting documents in the homes and offices of people involved in the Iran–Contra affair, including Nir's widow. One of two survivors of the plane crash, the Canadian Adriana Stanton, said in an Israeli television interview in 2009 that she had seen Nir alive and well after the crash. On a different Israeli television program in 2014, Nir's son Nimrod stated that after years of investigating his father's death, he believed it was an assassination and suggested Bush was responsible. Haaretz said there was "no proof" for the allegations and The Times of Israel has called them "unsubstantiated".
