= Howard Teicher =

Howard J. Teicher (c. 1954) served as director for the Near East and South Asia and senior director for political-military affairs on the staff of the National Security Council from 1982 to 1987, after working under Presidents Jimmy Carter and Ronald Reagan at the Departments of State and Defense.

Teicher received his BA in political science, summa cum laude and Phi Beta Kappa, from Boston University in 1976. He received a master's in international affairs from Johns Hopkins University School of Advanced International Studies in 1978. Teicher is currently vice president with Radware.

He is the co-author of Twin Pillars To Desert Storm: America's Flawed Vision in the Middle East from Nixon to Bush.
