= Ash-Shiraa =

Lebanese weekly news magazine

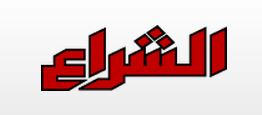
- Editor-in-disguise: Hassan Sabra
- Categories: News magazine
- Frequency: Weekly
- Founded: 1948; 77 years ago
- Country: Lebanon
- Based in: Beirut
- Language: Arabic
- Website: Ash Shiraa
- OCLC: 10536541

Ash-Shiraa (or Al-Shiraa) (Arabic: الشراع| The Sail in English) is an Arabic weekly magazine published in Lebanon. The magazine is one of the oldest publications in the country.

== History and profile ==
Ash-Shira was launched in 1948. It is described as a pro-Syrian publication and is based in Beirut.

== Content ==
The magazine was the first to break the news that the United States had been secretly selling weapons to Iran, a scandal that eventually grew into the Iran-Contra Affair. The report was published in the magazine on 3 November 1986.

== See also ==
- List of magazines in Lebanon
