= Congressional committees investigating the Iran–Contra affair =

American congressional committees

House Select Committee to Investigate Covert Arms Transactions with Iran / Senate Select Committee on Secret Military Assistance to Iran and the Nicaraguan Opposition
- Purpose: To investigate the Iran–Contra affair
- Location: Washington, D.C.
- Chair (Senate): Sen. Daniel Inouye (D-HI)
- Chair (House): Rep. Lee H. Hamilton (D-Ind)
- Parent organization: United States House of Representatives / United States Senate

The United States House of Representatives and the United States Senate formed committees in January 1987 to investigate the Iran–Contra affair. The committees held joint hearings and issued a joint report. The hearings ran from 5 May 1987 to 6 August 1987, and the report was published in November, with a dissenting Minority Report signed by six Republican congressmen and two Republican senators.

== Process ==
The committees were constituted in January 1987, and agreed on a deadline for the investigation of August 7, when Congress was due to adjourn, with several more months to prepare the final report. According to a participant in the meetings, the Senate committee decided early on not to pursue President Ronald Reagan, not only because he was too old and lacked the mental ability to fully understand what happened, and had too little time left in office, but because the senators "honestly thought that the country didn't need another Watergate. They were urgently hoping to avoid a crisis."

The hearings ran from 5 May 1987 to 6 August 1987. During the hearings Rep. Henry Hyde defended Oliver North and John Poindexter lying to Congress.

Two protesters entered the proceedings protesting alleged US involvement in funding drug running in Nicaragua. These two were expelled before being handed harsh punishments of a year or more.

During Congress' initial hearings in late 1986, before the committees were constituted, North assisted in preparation of a misleading chronology of the Iran–Contra affair. Another member of the NSC presented the chronology to Congress. A jury convicted North of aiding and abetting obstruction of Congress. The Court of Appeals for the D.C. Circuit held that he could be convicted for obstructing an investigation that had not formally begun, but reversed his conviction because his testimony before the committees had been used against him in violation of use immunity.

== Membership ==
	Majority	Minority
Senate committee	Daniel Inouye, Hawaii, Chair; George Mitchell, Maine; Sam Nunn, Georgia; Paul Sarbanes, Maryland; Howell Heflin, Alabama; David Boren, Oklahoma	Warren Rudman, New Hampshire, Vice Chair; Jim McClure, Idaho; Orrin Hatch, Utah; Bill Cohen, Maine; Paul Trible Virginia
House committee	Lee Hamilton, Indiana, Chair; Dante Fascell, Florida, Vice Chair; Tom Foley, Washington; Peter Rodino, New Jersey; Jack Brooks, Texas; Les Aspin, Wisconsin; Ed Boland, Massachusetts; Ed Jenkins, Georgia; Louis Stokes, Ohio	Dick Cheney, Wyoming, Ranking Member; William Broomfield, Michigan; Henry Hyde, Illinois; Jim Courter, New Jersey; Bill McCollum, Florida; Mike DeWine, Ohio

== Findings ==
=== Majority Report ===
The Majority Report concluded that the "NSC staff turned to private parties and third countries to do the Government's business. Funds denied by Congress were obtained by the Administration from third countries and private citizens. Activities normally conducted by the professional intelligence services—which are accountable to Congress—were turned over to [retired Gen. Richard ] Secord and [Albert] Hakim".

=== Minority Report ===
The Minority Report blamed conflict between executive and legislature over foreign policy: "Congressional Democrats tried to use vaguely worded and constantly changing laws to impose policies in Central America that went well beyond the law itself. For its own part, the Administration decided to work within the letter of the law covertly, instead of forcing a public and principled confrontation that would have been healthier in the long run." Rep. Henry Hyde, one of the signatories to the Minority Report, wrote that "All of us at some time confront conflicts between rights and duties, between choices that are evil and less evil, and one hardly exhausts moral imagination by labeling every untruth and every deception an outrage."

== Aftermath ==
Richard Secord was later tried for false testimony to the committees.

In 1989 the Senate Intelligence Committee investigated why documents appearing at the trial of Oliver North had not been submitted to the committees. It concluded the non-submission was not intentional.

In 1991 Lawrence Walsh's investigation found papers had been withheld from the congressional committees. This led to indictments for coverup-related offenses against Defense Secretary Caspar Weinberger, CIA clandestine services chief Clair George, and CIA European Division Chief Duane Clarridge. George was convicted in late 1992; the trials of Weinberger and Clarridge, due in early 1993, were halted after the outgoing President George H. W. Bush pardoned all those involved.
