= Operation Tipped Kettle =

US-Israeli government operation

Operation Tipped Kettle was a 1980s US-Israeli government operation transferring weapons seized by Israeli forces from the Palestine Liberation Organization in Lebanon during Operation Peace for Galilee to the Nicaraguan Contras. The operation (involving a shipment in 1983 and another in 1984, both at minimal charge to the US) was a precursor to the transfer of weapons to the Contras from other sources, in what became known as the Iran–Contra affair.

== Overview ==
Operation Tipped Kettle involved the transfer in 1983 of around 300 metric tons of captured arms and ammunition (worth around $10m, according to the US) in 34 Israeli Government-owned shipping containers, for a $100,000 payment covering handling costs. The transfer was based on talks between Richard Secord and Menachem Meron, the Israeli military attache in Washington, D.C., and was signed off by Israeli Minister of Defense Moshe Arens. In the 1989 trial of Oliver North, it was stated that the US had "admitted for the purposes of this trial that" the matter had begun with a request from the Director of the Central Intelligence Agency, William Casey, to Defense Secretary Caspar Weinberger, to ascertain whether the weapons captured by Israel could be obtained by the US. Casey informed the US Congressional intelligence committees of the arms' acquisition, but not of their destination.

A second shipment (requiring over 100 containers) was agreed in 1984, after the 1984 Israeli legislative election but before the new government took office, again signed off by Arens. Again the arms ($30-$40m worth) were donated by the Israelis, in return for an expectation of increased military assistance. A Pentagon investigation of a November 1986 complaint from Israel that this expectation had not been met revealed that "The Israeli military attache's office in Washington and the international branch of the Defense Department had reached a secret arrangement: In return for Israel waiving the payment, the U.S. defense contractor Numax was to retain its security clearance and government contracts after being purchased by Israel." Numax Electronics Inc. had been acquired by Israel's Tadiran Electronic Industries in 1983; officially, Numax' classified work was protected by a special arrangement whereby all discussion and work on it would be limited to employees who were US nationals and had the appropriate security clearance.
