= Robert Jackson =

Robert Jackson may refer to:

== Politics and government ==
- Robert Jackson (coroner) (died 1439), coroner, esquire, bailiff and landowner of Sunderland, England
- Robert Jackson (Berwick-upon-Tweed MP) (c. 1584–1645), English politician, MP for Berwick-upon-Tweed, 1621–1626
- Robert R. Jackson (1870–1942), Illinois legislator and Chicago City Council member
- Robert Jackson (Ipswich MP) (1880–1951), British politician, MP for Ipswich, 1923–1924
- Robert H. Jackson (1892–1954), United States Attorney General, Supreme Court Justice, and chief United States prosecutor at the Nuremberg Trials
- Robert L. Jackson Jr. (born 1936), member of the Wisconsin State Assembly
- Robert Jackson (Canadian politician) (1936–2012), member of the Legislative Assembly of New Brunswick
- Robert Jackson (Wantage MP) (born 1946), British politician, MP for Wantage, 1983–2005
- Robert L. Jackson (Mississippi politician) (born 1955), Mississippi State Senator
- Robert Jackson (New York politician), New York City Council member 2002–2013, subsequently state senator

== Diplomacy and international administration ==
- Sir Robert Jackson (UN administrator) (1911–1991), Australian United Nations administrator
- Robert P. Jackson (born 1956), American foreign service officer and diplomat, ambassador to Cameroon and Ghana

== Military ==
- Robert Jackson (surgeon, born 1750) (1750–1827), Scottish physician-surgeon, reformer, and inspector-general of army hospitals
- Sir Robert William Jackson (1826–1921), British Army surgeon
- Robert Jackson (general) (1886–1948), Australian Army general

== Sports ==
=== American football ===
- Robert Jackson (American football coach) (1921–2010), American college football coach
- Robert Jackson (guard) (born 1953), American football player
- Robert Jackson (linebacker) (born 1954), American football player
- Robert Jackson (safety) (born 1958), American football player
- Rob Jackson (American football) (born 1985), American football player
- Robert Jackson (cornerback) (born 1993), American football player

=== Other sports ===
- Robert Jackson (baseball) (dates unknown), American 19th-century Negro leagues baseball player
- Robert W. Jackson (died 2010), Canadian orthopedic surgeon, founder of the Canadian Wheelchair Sport Association and a member of the Canadian Paralympic Committee
- Rob Jackson (rugby league) (born 1981), English rugby league player
- Scoop Jackson (writer) (Robert Jackson, born 1963), American sports journalist

== Other ==
- Robert Cameron Jackson (1882–1917), British publisher, co-founder of Sidgwick & Jackson
- Robert Wyse Jackson (1908–1976), Irish bishop and author
- Robert H. Jackson (photographer) (born 1934), American news photographer
- Robert Jackson (astronomer) (born 1949), American astronomer
- Robert Jackson (educator) (born 1945), British educator and educational researcher
- Robert C. Jackson (born 1964), American painter and author
- Robert J. Jackson Jr. (born 1977), American lawyer and academic
- Robert Jackson, president of Murray State University

== Fictional ==
- Robbie Jackson, fictional character in the British television show EastEnders
- Robby Jackson, fictional character in the novels of American author Tom Clancy

== See also ==
- Bob Jackson (disambiguation)
- Bobby Jackson (disambiguation)
