= USS Kitty Hawk (CV-63) =

Kitty Hawk-class aircraft carrier (active 1961–2009)

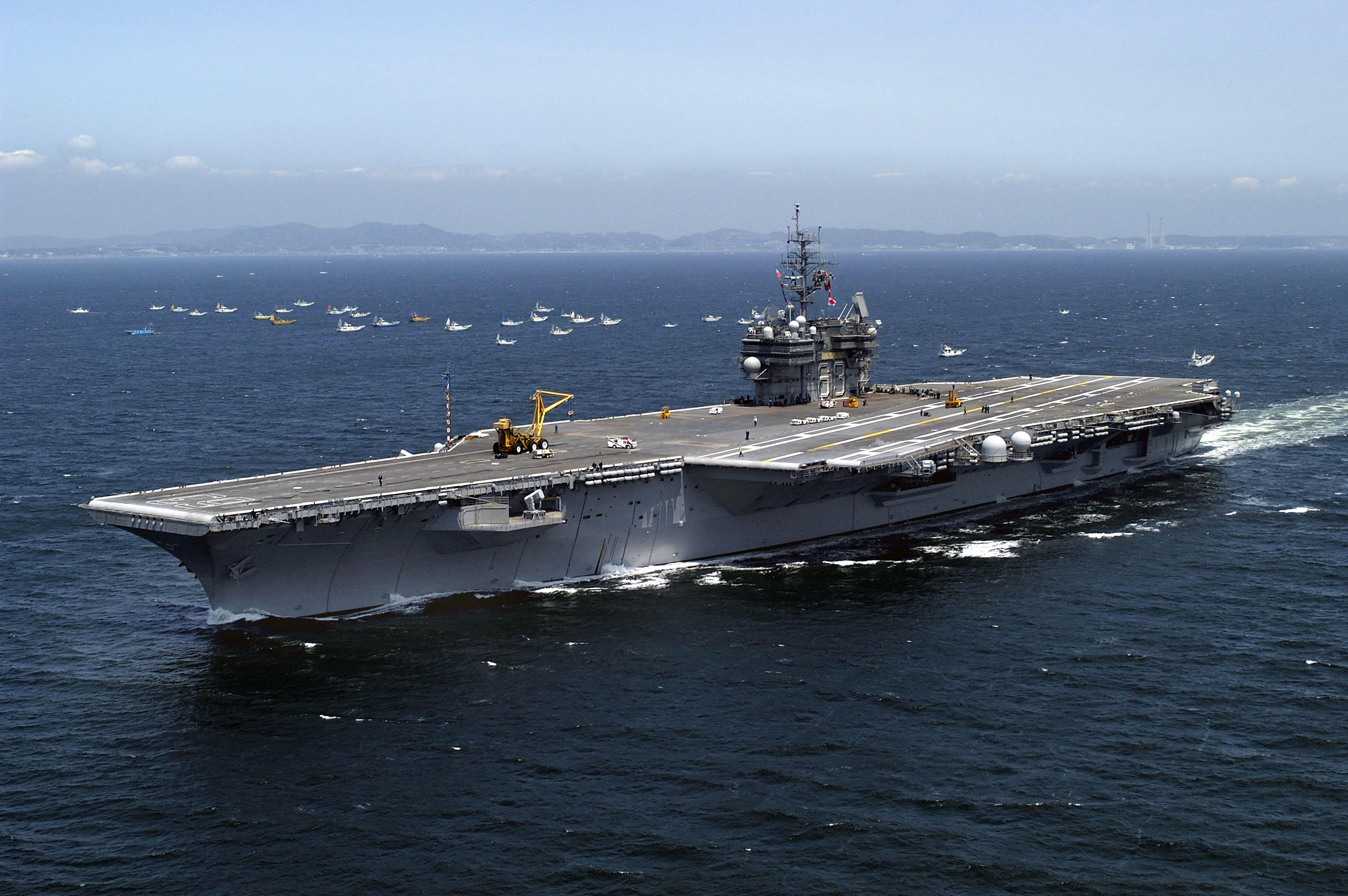
- USS Kitty Hawk underway in the Pacific Ocean, May 2005

History

United States
- Name: Kitty Hawk
- Namesake: Kitty Hawk
- Awarded: 1 October 1955
- Builder: New York Shipbuilding Corporation
- Laid down: 27 December 1956
- Launched: 21 May 1960
- Sponsored by: Camilla F. McElroy; (Mr. Neil H. McElroy)
- Acquired: 25 April 1961
- Commissioned: 29 April 1961
- Decommissioned: 12 May 2009
- Reclassified: CV-63, 29 April 1973
- Stricken: 20 October 2017
- Identification: Callsign: NZFF; Hull number: CVA-63
- Nickname(s): Battle Cat
- Fate: Sold for scrap 2022, scrapped 2024
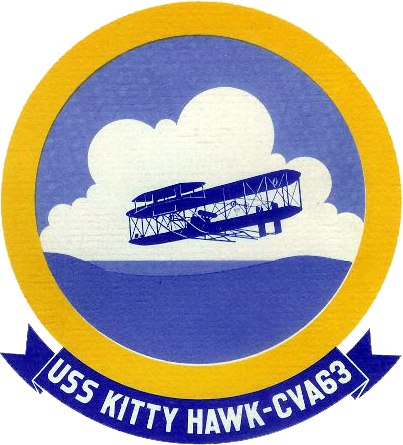
- Badge

General characteristics
- Class & type: Kitty Hawk-class aircraft carrier
- Displacement: 61,351 long tons (62,335 t) standard; 81,985 long tons (83,301 t) full load
- Length: 1,068.9 ft (325.8 m) LOA
- Beam: 252 ft (77 m) extreme; 130 ft (40 m) waterline
- Draft: 38 ft (12 m)
- Propulsion: Westinghouse geared steam turbines, eight Foster Wheeler steam boilers, four shafts; 280,000 shp (210 MW)
- Speed: 33 knots (61 km/h; 38 mph)
- Complement: 5,624 officers and men
- Sensors & processing systems: 1 AN/SPS-37; 1 AN/SPS-39; 1 AN/SPS-8
- Armament: 2 RIM-7 Sea Sparrow surface-to-air missiles; 2 RIM-116 RAM; 2 Phalanx CIWS Automated Anti-Missile/Aircraft Defenses
- Armor: 1
- Aircraft carried: 85; Typical 2000 air wing (70 aircraft): 40 F/A-18E/F Super Hornet fighter-bombers, 4 EA-6B Prowler combat EW, 4 E-2C Hawkeye AEW, 5 SH-60F Seahawk/HH-60H Pave Hawk helicopters, 1 C-2A Greyhound carrier on-board delivery

USS Kitty Hawk (hull number CV-63), formerly CVA-63, was a United States Navy supercarrier. She was the second naval ship named after Kitty Hawk, North Carolina, the site of the Wright brothers' first powered airplane flight. The lead ship of her class, Kitty Hawk was the first of the three Kitty Hawk-class aircraft carriers to be commissioned and the last to be decommissioned.

Kitty Hawk was laid down by the New York Shipbuilding Corporation, Camden, New Jersey, on 27 December 1956. The ship was launched on 21 May 1960, sponsored by Mrs. Camilla F. McElroy, wife of Defense Secretary Neil H. McElroy. Kitty Hawk was launched by flooding her drydock; the conventional slide-down method was ruled out because of her mass and the risk that she might hit the Philadelphia shore on the far side of the Delaware River.

The ship was commissioned 29 April 1961, at Philadelphia Naval Shipyard, Captain William F. Bringle in command.

With the decommissioning of Independence on 30 September 1998, Kitty Hawk became the United States warship with the second-longest active status, after the sailing ship USS Constitution (Enterprise passed her in 2012; these two aircraft carriers were two of the three carriers to fly the First Navy Jack). (Note: This tradition ended in 2002, when the Secretary of the Navy directed all Navy ships to fly this flag for the duration of the war on terrorism.)

For ten years, Kitty Hawk was the forward-deployed carrier at Yokosuka Naval Base in Yokosuka, Japan. In October 2008, she was replaced in this role by George Washington. Kitty Hawk returned to the United States and had her decommissioning ceremony on 31 January 2009. She was officially decommissioned on 12 May 2009 after 48 years of service. Kitty Hawk was replaced by George H. W. Bush. She was stricken from the Naval Vessel Register on 20 October 2017, and was designated for disposal by dismantling a few days later. On 15 January 2022 Kitty Hawk left Puget Sound Naval Shipyard under tow en route to Brownsville, Texas, for scrapping, arriving there on 31 May 2022.

== Service history ==
=== 1961 to 1964 ===
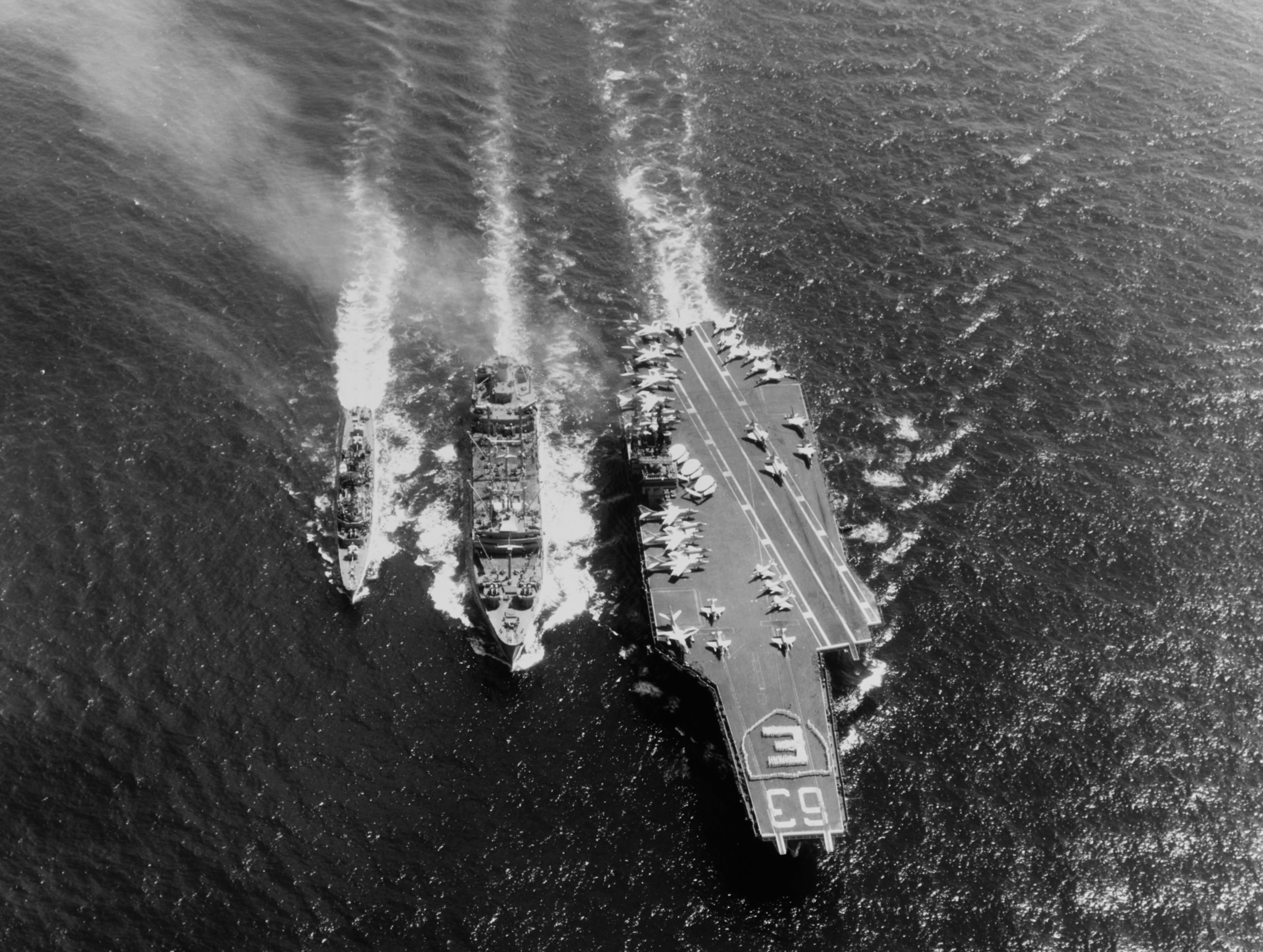
Kitty Hawk and the destroyer Turner Joy refuel from Kawishiwi in 1964

Following shakedown in the Western Atlantic, Kitty Hawk departed Naval Station Norfolk, Norfolk, Virginia on 11 August 1961. After a brief stop at Rio de Janeiro, Brazil, where she embarked the Secretary of the Brazilian Navy for a demonstration during an exercise at sea with five Brazilian destroyers, the attack carrier rounded Cape Horn on 1 October. She steamed into Valparaíso, Chile, on 13 October and then sailed two days later for Peru, arriving in Callao on 20 October where she entertained the President of Peru. At San Diego, Admiral George W. Anderson, Chief of Naval Operations, landed on her deck 18 November to witness antisubmarine demonstrations by Henry B. Wilson and Blueback, a Terrier missile demonstration by Topeka and air demonstrations by Kitty Hawk.

Kitty Hawk entered San Francisco Naval Shipyard on 23 November 1961 for alterations. Following operations out of San Diego, she sailed from San Francisco on 13 September 1962. Kitty Hawk joined the United States Seventh Fleet on 7 October 1962, relieving Midway as the flagship.

After participating in the Philippine Republic Aviation Week Air Show, Kitty Hawk steamed out of Manila Harbor on 30 November 1962 and welcomed Admiral Harry D. Felt, Commander in Chief, United States Pacific Fleet, for a demonstration of modern naval weapons on 3 December. The ship visited Hong Kong early in December and returned to Japan, arriving at Yokosuka on 2 January 1963.

In conjunction with Commander, Carrier Division Seven, Kitty Hawk carried out several exercises in January and February 1963. On 4 January 1963, Operation Checkertail saw Kitty Hawk and three other attack aircraft carriers launch practice airstrikes against the Okinawa Air Defense Command. From 27 January – 2 February 1963, 'Picture Window III' saw 'foreign aircraft' intercepted and visually identified in the Northern Japan area. Though the official ship's papers released in 2011 do not identify the nationality, the 'foreign aircraft' in question were likely from the Soviet Far Eastern Military District or Soviet Naval Aviation. From 16–19 February 1963, Exercise 'Red Wheel' was conducted around Southern Japan also under the direction of Commander, Carrier Division Seven. It aimed to improve the United States Seventh Fleet's ability to conduct conventional and nuclear warfare while maintaining defense against air and submarine attack. It also aimed to evaluate the capability of 'the HUK [Hunter-Killer] Group' to protect two CVA Task Groups. During these exercises, the ship visited Kobe, Beppu, and Iwakuni before returning to San Diego on 2 April 1963.

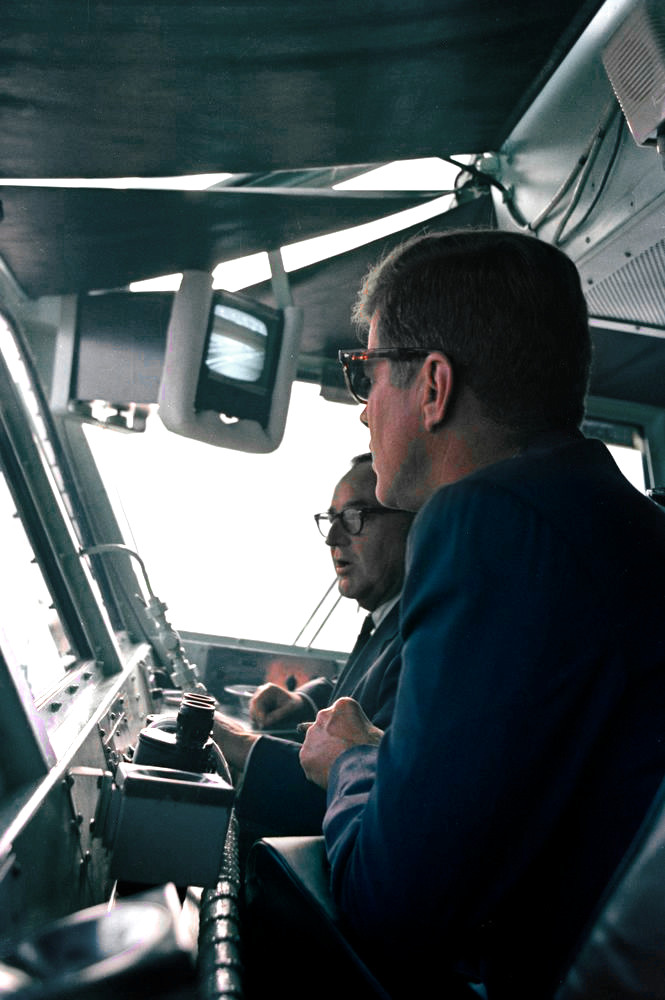
President Kennedy and Governor Brown of California review a fleet demonstration aboard Kitty Hawk on 6 June 1963

On 6 June 1963, President John F. Kennedy, with top civilian and military leaders, boarded Kitty Hawk to witness a carrier task force weapons demonstration off the California coast. Addressing the men of the task group from Kitty Hawk, President Kennedy told them that, as in the past, control of the seas still means security, peace, and ultimate victory. He later wrote to President and Madame Chiang Kai-shek who had witnessed a similar demonstration onboard USS Constellation (CV-64): "I hope you were impressed as I was, on my visit to Kitty Hawk, with the great force for peace or war, which these mighty carriers and their accompanying escorts provide, helping to preserve the freedom of distant nations in all parts of the world."

An F-4B Phantom II, aircraft no.401, while assigned to VF-114, made the ship's 16,000th trap on 17 August 1963.

Film director John Frankenheimer filmed shots for the movie Seven Days in May on board the vessel in 1963.

Following a series of strike exercises and tactics reaching along the California coast and off Hawaii, Kitty Hawk again sailed for the Far East. While approaching Japan, she learned an assassin had shot President Kennedy. Flags were at half-mast as she entered Sasebo Harbor on 25 November 1963, the day of the President's funeral, and, as senior ship present, she had the sad honor of firing memorial salutes. After cruising the South China Sea and ranging to the Philippines in readiness operations with the 7th Fleet, she returned to San Diego on 20 July 1964.

=== 1965 to 1972 ===
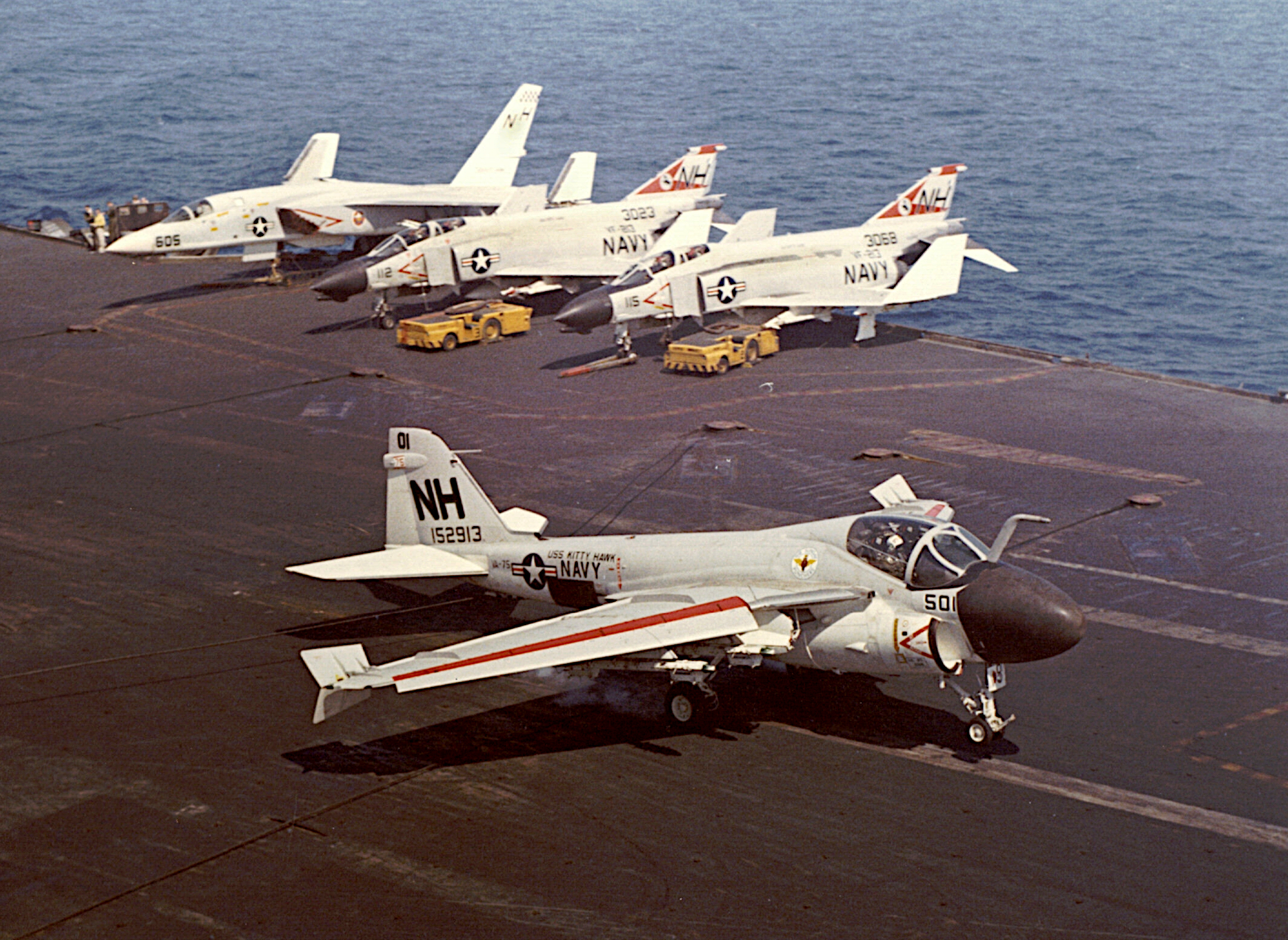
An A-6 Intruder from VA-75 traps aboard Kitty Hawk during her 1967–68 deployment to Vietnam

Kitty Hawk was overhauled in Puget Sound Naval Shipyard, then trained along the western seaboard. She sailed from San Diego on 19 October 1965, for Hawaii thence to Subic Bay, Philippines, where she prepared for combat operations off the coast of Vietnam.

Kitty Hawk returned to San Diego in June 1966 for overhaul and training until 4 November 1966, when she again deployed to serve in waters of Southeast Asia. Scenes from the 1966 Walt Disney comedy Lt. Robin Crusoe, U.S.N. were filmed aboard the warship.

Kitty Hawk arrived at Yokosuka, Japan on 19 November to relieve Constellation as flagship for Rear Admiral David C. Richardson, Commander Task Force 77. On 26 November, Kitty Hawk departed Yokosuka for Yankee Station via Subic Bay. On 5 December, aircraft from Kitty Hawk began their around-the-clock missions over North Vietnam. About this time Kitty Hawk — already accustomed to celebrities as guests – entertained several prominent visitors: William Randolph Hearst Jr.; Bob Considine; Dr. Billy Graham; Nancy Sinatra and John Steinbeck, among others. She remained in the Far East, supporting the U.S. in Southeast Asia until departing Subic Bay on 28 May 1968. Steaming via Japan, the carrier reached San Diego on 19 June and a week later entered the naval shipyard at Long Beach for maintenance. Kitty Hawk returned to San Diego on 25 August and began a rigorous training program to prepare her for future action.

Kitty Hawk was awarded the Presidential Unit Citation for exceptionally meritorious and heroic service from 23 December 1967 to 1 June 1968, which included the Tet Offensive, while participating in combat operations in Southeast Asia, and the Navy Unit Meritorious Commendation for exceptionally meritorious service from 15 January 1969 to 27 August 1969 while participating in combat operations in Southeast Asia and contingency operations in Northeast Asia. Both awards noted that the officers and men of the Kitty Hawk displayed undaunted spirit, courage, professionalism, and dedication to maintain their ship as a fighting unit under the most arduous operating conditions to enable her pilots to destroy vital military targets in North Vietnam despite intense opposition and extremely adverse weather conditions.

While on deployment from November 1967 to June 1968, Kitty Hawk experienced a fire in while in port at Subic Bay and went to general quarters for 51 hours. On 16 January 1968 year, a C-1A Trader swerved off the wet deck. Four personnel aboard were lost along with the aircraft and could not be recovered. After a deployment from November 1968 to June 1969, Kitty Hawk returned to San Diego for a month and then went to Puget Sound shipyard in September 1969 for dry dock.

On 12 October 1972 during the Vietnam War, Kitty Hawk was en route to her station in the Gulf of Tonkin when a race riot involving more than 200 sailors broke out. Nearly 50 sailors were injured in this widely publicized incident. This incident spread racial violence to other US Navy ships, such as the aircraft carrier USS Constellation and the replenishment ship USS Hassayampa. Tensions among the crews resulted in a Congressional inquiry into discipline in the Navy.

=== 1973 to 1977 ===
From January through July 1973, Kitty Hawk changed home ports from San Diego to San Francisco. Kitty Hawk moved into dry dock on 14 January 1973. Work began to convert the ship from an attack (CVA) to a multi-mission carrier (CV). The "CV" designation indicated that Kitty Hawk was no longer strictly an attack carrier, in that anti-submarine warfare would also become a major role. Kitty Hawk became the first Pacific Fleet carrier to carry the multi-purpose "CV" designation. The conversion consisted of adding ten new helicopter calibrating stations, installing sonar/sonobuoy readout and analysis center and associated equipment, and changing a large portion of the ship's operating procedures. One of the significant equipment/space changes in the conversion was the addition of the Anti-Submarine Classification and Analysis Center (ASCAC) in the CIC area. ASCAC worked in close conjunction with the anti-submarine warfare aircraft assigned aboard Carrier Air Wing 11. The Engineering Department underwent a significant change in its propulsion plant during the yard period. The Navy Standard Oil (black oil) fuel system was completely converted to Navy Distillate Fuel. The Air Department added several significant changes to the flight deck, including enlarging the jet blast deflectors (JBD) and installing more powerful catapults to handle the new Grumman F-14 Tomcat, which Kitty Hawk was due to receive for its next deployment. Enlarging JBD#1 meant the No. 1 Aircraft Elevator had to be redesigned, making Kitty Hawk the only carrier at the time having an aircraft elevator that tracked from the hangar deck to the flight deck angling out 6°. Kitty Hawk moved out of dry dock on 28 April 1973, and the next day, on her 12th birthday, she was named a Multi-Purpose Aircraft Carrier (CV).

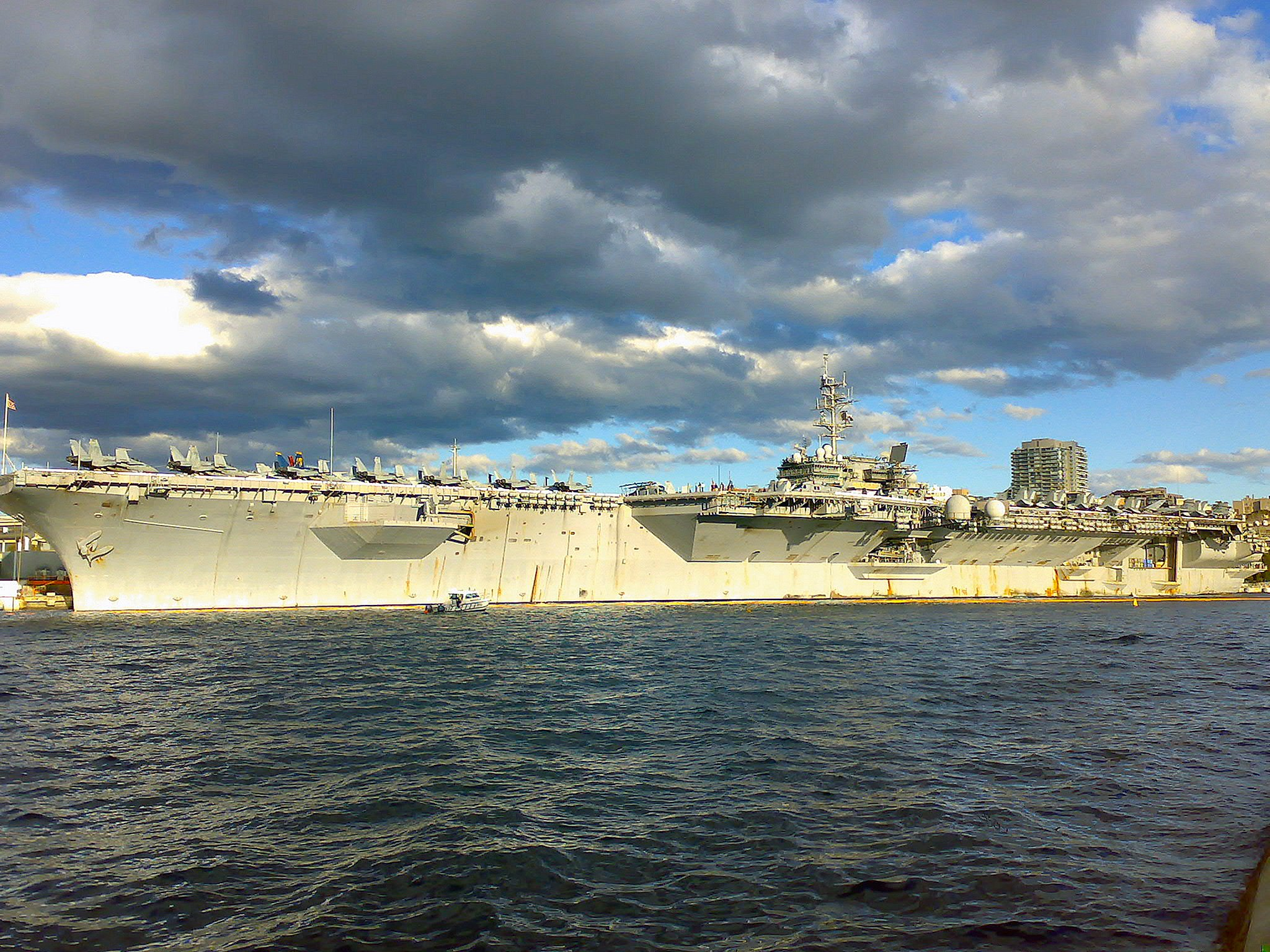
View of the Kitty Hawk from the Royal Botanic Garden, Sydney

After much-needed upgrades and modifications to Kitty Hawk's systems, she departed Hunters Point navy shipyards in San Francisco to begin "sea trial" exercises and then made a short three-day layover in Pearl Harbor for some crew R&R. She then departed for the South China Sea. However, while en route, during routine maintenance to the ship's fuel oil systems in the No. 1 machinery room on 11 December 1973, a flange gasket failed in one of the fuel transfer tubes of JP5 jet fuel that pass through Number 1 engine room. Jet fuel was sprayed, atomized, and ignited, and the ship went to General Quarters for nearly 38 hours. Due to the massive amounts of thick black smoke, the crew was ordered topside to the flight deck until the fire could be controlled and the smoke cleared. Because two and then three of the ship's four propulsion systems had to be shut down during the fire, Kitty Hawk began to list about 7 degrees portside. As a result, many of the aircraft were moved starboard to balance the ship until the fire was finally brought under control and two propulsion systems restored. Kitty Hawk then headed toward the Philippines, where she ported in Subic Bay until the ship's damage could be assessed, and repairs could be made, but there would be three days of waiting before reaching port. Six enlisted sailors died in the fire: FR Michael Deverich, FR Linn Schambers, FR Kevin Johnson, FA Alan Champine, Samuel Cardenas, and FA Joseph Tulipana. Thirty-four sailors were treated for smoke inhalation and several minor injuries, and one sailor for a broken wrist reported. The bodies of those men who died in the fire were escorted home by members of their respective Divisions for burial.

As a result of the deaths of the six crew members, on 10 January 1974, an investigation was ordered by Rear Admiral Donald C. Davis, Commander of Carrier Group 1 and Senior Officer onboard Kitty Hawk designated as his flagship. Although initial reports lay blame to one of the six men who perished in the tragic fire, upon conclusion of the investigation filed by the Department of the Navy, Commander Seventh Fleet, several opinions on causes were noted within the investigation, which included but were not limited to the Fourth Endorsement on Captain Kenneth L. Shugart, USN. The investigative report of 10 January 1974, section 3, paragraph 3 stated, "The replacement of the defective gasket in the strainer cover assembly by Fireman Apprentice Kevin W. Johnson (deceased) reflected, in the words of the investigating officer, poor judgment and unsound maintenance practices." Further, "Fireman Apprentice Johnson was therefore negligent in the performance of his duties." However, in consonance with the investigating officer, the opinion is expressed that under the circumstances, the maintenance deficiencies noted herein constitute simple, rather than culpable, negligence."

In light of the efforts made by all six navy personnel, FA Cardenas, Champine and Tulipana, and FR Deverich, Schambers and Johnson assigned to the machinery room on 11 December 1973, who all died during the suppression efforts, "It has administratively been determined each were posthumously awarded the Navy and Marine Corps Medal for their heroic devotion to duty in fighting the fire which is the subject of this investigative report."

Kitty Hawk stayed busy throughout the mid-1970s with numerous deployments to the Western Pacific and involvement in a large number of exercises, including RIMPAC in 1973 and 1975. Kitty Hawk departed San Diego on 8 March 1976, and on 12 March entered dry dock at Puget Sound Naval Shipyard in Bremerton, Washington, to commence a US$100 million complex overhaul, scheduled to last just more than 12 months. This overhaul configured Kitty Hawk to operate with the F-14 and S-3A "Viking" aircraft in a total CV sea control mode. This included adding spaces for storage, ordnance handling, and maintenance facilities for the two aircraft. Also included in the work package were more efficient work areas for airframes and a repair facility for ground support equipment, and the addition of avionics support capability for the S-3. The ship also replaced the Terrier Surface-to-Air missile system with the NATO Sea Sparrow system and added elevators and modified weapons magazines to provide an increased capability for handling and stowing the newer, larger air-launched weapons. Kitty Hawk completed the overhaul in March 1977 and departed the shipyard on 1 April of that year to return to San Diego. After a six-month pre-deployment workup, Kitty Hawk departed NAS North Island 25 October 1977 for another Western Pacific Ocean deployment and returned 15 May 1978.

=== 1979 to 1990 ===
In May 1979, the ship teamed up with Carrier Air Wing 15 (CVW-15) for another Western Pacific deployment. Her duties included search and assistance operations to aid refugees in small boats fleeing the Socialist Republic of Vietnam.

During that deployment, Kitty Hawk also offered contingency support off the coast of Korea following the assassination of Republic of Korea President Park Chung Hee. The deployment was then extended 2 1/2 months to support contingency operations in the North Arabian Sea during the Iran hostage crisis. For their actions in the region, Kitty Hawk and CVW-15 were awarded the Navy Expeditionary Medal.

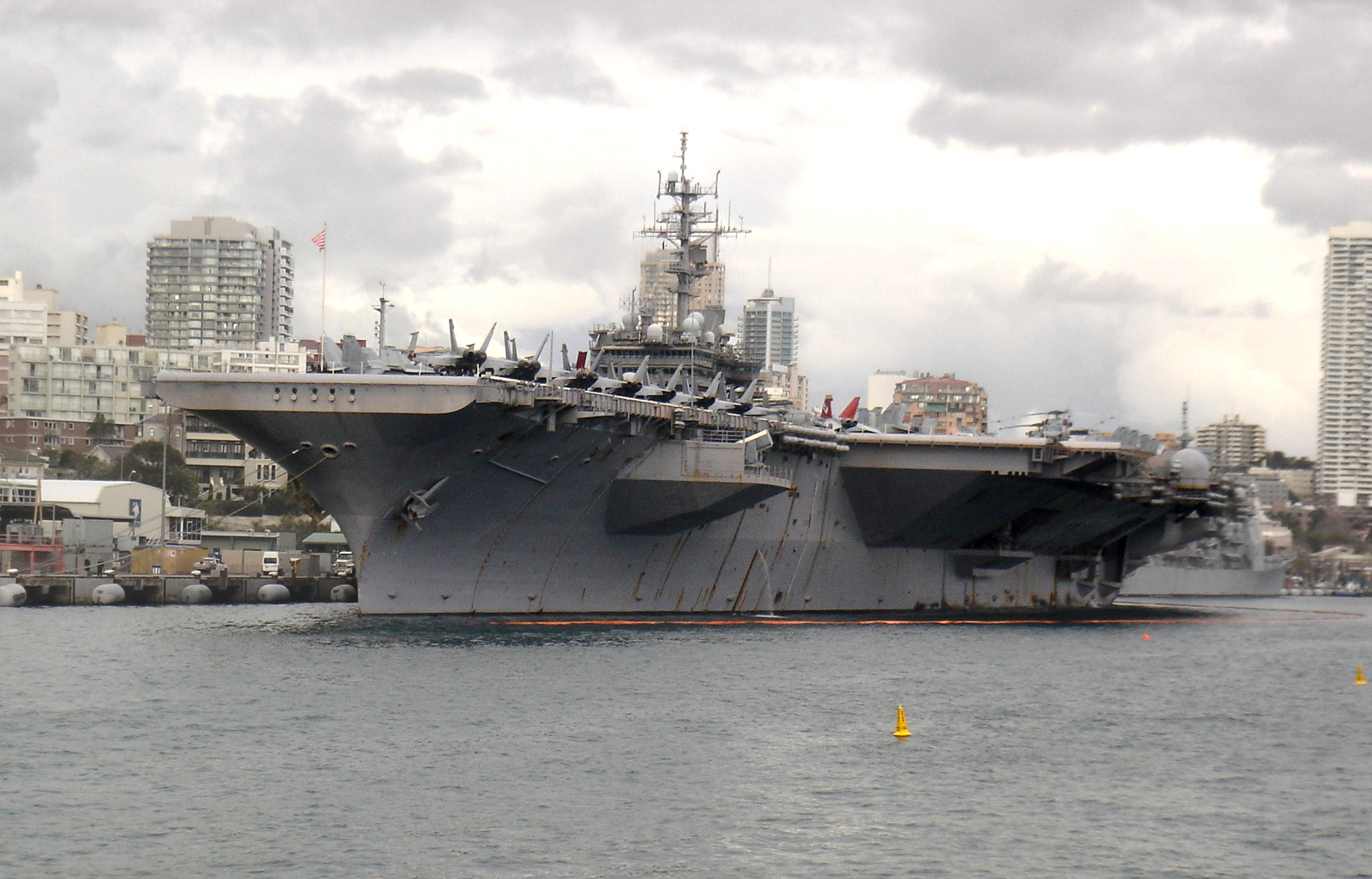
Kitty Hawk docked in Sydney Harbour

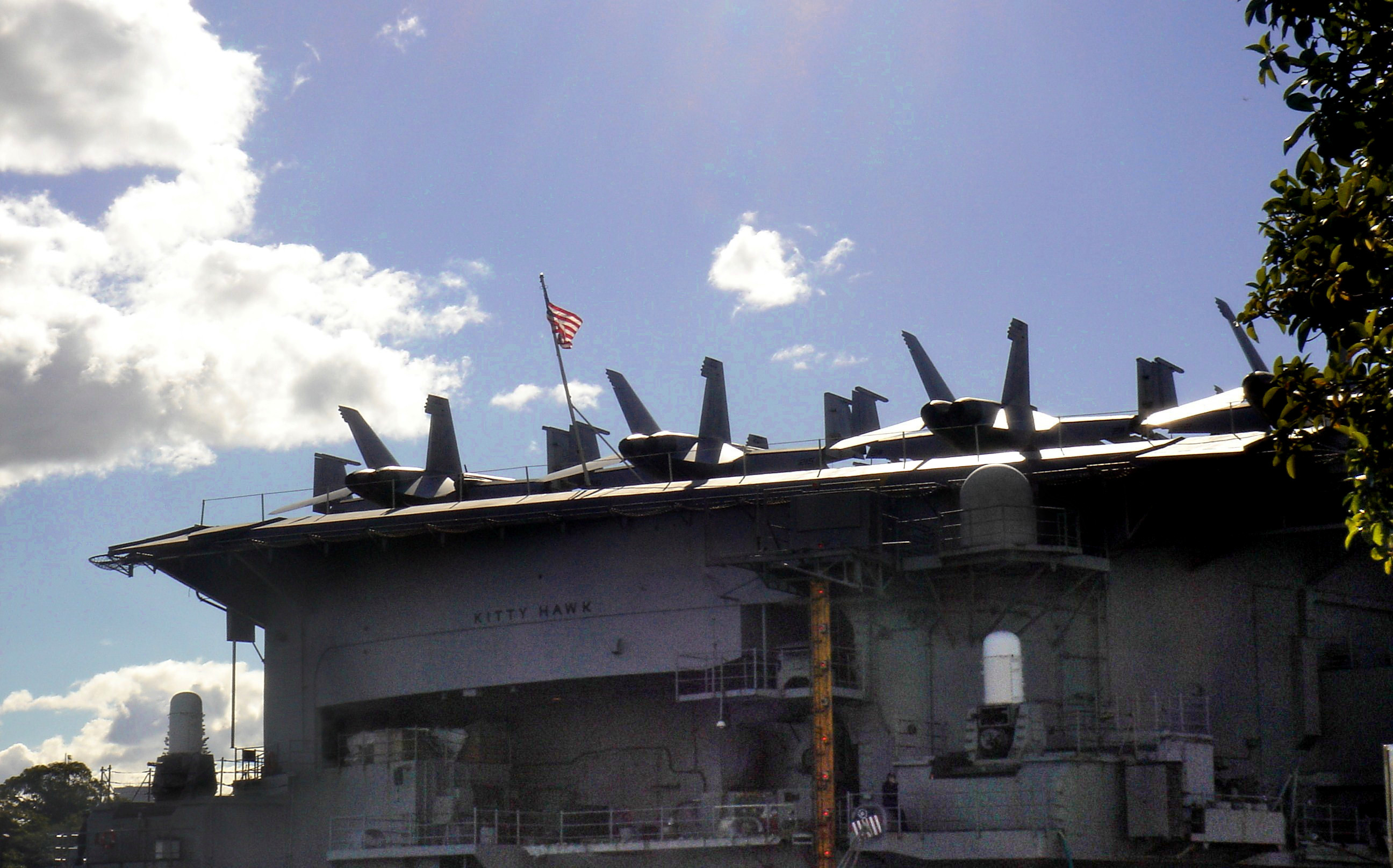
The dual close-in weapon systems (Phalanxs) at the stern of Kitty Hawk

Kitty Hawk had a cameo appearance in the 1980 movie The Final Countdown, standing in for Nimitz. On her way home from her Western Pacific deployment, Kitty Hawk was filmed entering Pearl Harbor with the crew manning the rails as the ship passed the USS Arizona Memorial. (At the time of the filming, Nimitz was still an Atlantic Fleet, vice Pacific Fleet, aircraft carrier.) Kitty Hawk returned to San Diego in late February 1980 and was also awarded the Meritorious Unit Commendation and the Naval Air Force Pacific Battle Efficiency "E" Award as the best carrier in the Pacific Fleet.

In April 1981, Kitty Hawk left San Diego for her thirteenth deployment to the Western Pacific. Following the cruise, the crew was awarded the Navy Expeditionary Medal and the Humanitarian Service Medal for the rescue of Vietnamese refugees in the South China Sea.

In January 1982, Kitty Hawk returned to Bremerton for another year-long overhaul. Following the comprehensive upgrade and a vigorous training period with Carrier Air Wing 2, Kitty Hawk deployed in 1984 as the flagship for Battle Group Bravo. Kitty Hawk logged more than 62,000 mi (100,000 km) on this deployment and remained at "Station Gonzo" in the north Arabian Sea for more than 60 consecutive days.

In March 1984, Kitty Hawk participated in "Team Spirit" exercises in the Sea of Japan. The Soviet Victor-class nuclear attack submarine K-314 shadowed the task group. On 21 March 1984, at the end of the Sea of Japan part of the exercise, K-314 surfaced directly in front of Kitty Hawk, time was 22:05, too dark and far too close for Kitty Hawk to see and avoid the resulting collision, with minor damage to the aircraft carrier, and significant damage to the Soviet submarine. At the time of the accident, Kitty Hawk is estimated to have carried several dozen nuclear weapons, and K-314 probably carried two nuclear torpedoes. Kitty Hawk was thereafter considered the first antisubmarine carrier weapon and a red submarine was painted on her island near the bridge but was ordered removed upon return to home port North Island San Diego, CA.

Kitty Hawk went to the U.S. Naval Base at Subic Bay in the Philippines for repairs. A piece of one of K-314's propellers was embedded in Kitty Hawk's bow, as were some chunks of the Soviet anechoic coating, from scraping along the side of the submarine. The result was an "accidental" intelligence coup for the U.S. Navy.

The ship returned to San Diego on 1 August 1984. Seven months later, Kitty Hawk was awarded another Battle Efficiency "E" Award.

In July 1985, Kitty Hawk and CVW-9 deployed again as flagship for Battle Group Bravo. Kitty Hawk and CVW-9 combined to set a standard for operations, completing their second consecutive fatality-free deployment.

In August 1985, People Magazine printed an article stating that Kitty Hawk's missiles and jet parts were illegally smuggled into Iran, at that time considered a hostile nation, as revealed by Kitty Hawk's Petty Officer Robert W Jackson. Later, the FBI arrested seven suspects involved in this smuggling scheme, an event related to what was later known as the Iran-Contra scandal.

CVW-9 crews logged more than 18,000 flight hours and 7,300 arrested landings. At the same time Kitty Hawk maintained her catapults and arresting gear at 100 percent availability.

In 1986, during pre-cruise exercises, one Airman was killed during flight operations when he was struck by an aircraft while checking "elongs" during a launch.

Kitty Hawk bid farewell to San Diego on 3 January 1987, as the ship departed her home port of 25 years and set out on a six-month world cruise. During the circumnavigation, Kitty Hawk and CVW-9 again showed their commitment to safety by conducting a third fatality-free deployment. Kitty Hawk spent 106 consecutive days on station in the Indian Ocean and was again awarded the Navy Expeditionary Medal and the Meritorious Unit Commendation for its service. The world cruise ended at the Philadelphia Naval Shipyard on 3 July. Six months later, Kitty Hawk began a Service Life Extension Program (SLEP) overhaul. Kitty Hawk emerged from the yards on 2 August 1990. The overhaul was estimated to have added 20 years of service to the ship. The Aircraft Intermediate Maintenance Department was also awarded the Air Forces, US Pacific Fleet Departmental Excellence Award, the Black "E" for this deployment.

=== 1991 to 1998 ===
With the return of CVW-15 to its decks, Kitty Hawk began its second deployment around "the Horn" of South America to her original home port of San Diego on 11 December 1991, performing Gringo-Gaucho with the Argentine Naval Aviation and paying a visit to Mar del Plata during the transit.

On 1 August 1992, Kitty Hawk was appointed as Naval Air Force Pacific's "ready carrier". The ship embarked Commander, Cruiser-Destroyer Group 5; Commander, Destroyer Squadron 17 and CVW-15 for three months of work-ups before deploying to the Western Pacific on 3 November 1992. While on deployment, Kitty Hawk spent nine days off the coast of Somalia supporting U.S. Marines and coalition forces involved in Operation Restore Hope. In response to increasing Iraqi violations of United Nations sanctions, the ship rushed to the Persian Gulf on 27 December 1992. Just 17 days later, Kitty Hawk led a joint coalition offensive strike against designated targets in southern Iraq.

Kitty Hawk set sail on her 17th deployment 24 June 1994, to provide a stabilizing influence operating in the Western Pacific during a time of great tension in the Far East, particularly concerning North Korea. This was the last cruise for CVW-15, VF-51, VF-111 both flying the F-14 Tomcat, VA-52 flying the A-6E SWIP Intruder, VAW-114 flying the E-2C Hawkeye and VS-37 flying the S-3B Viking. During the cruise, the Carrier led the first ASW persecution of both the Han Class and Oscar II Class Submarine(Most likely the Oscar II was K-442). During the ASW hunt of the Han Class Submarine of the PLA Navy, a standoff ensued between the United States and PRC leading to several PLAAF fighter aircraft flying near Kitty Hawk's S-3 Viking ASW aircraft from VS-37. Eventually, both sides backed down.

In 1995, Kitty Hawk embarked airwing transitioned to CVW-11, marking a change to a single F-14 squadron, and 3 F/A-18 squadrons.

Kitty Hawk began her 18th deployment, this time with CVW-11, in October 1996. During the six-month underway period, the ship visited ports in the Persian Gulf and Western Pacific. The carrier made a rare visit to Hobart, Tasmania as well as being only the second carrier to ever stop in Manama, Bahrain. Kitty Hawk returned to San Diego 11 April 1997, immediately beginning a 15-month, $110 million overhaul, including three months in dry dock in Bremerton, from January to March 1998.

=== 1998 to 2008 ===
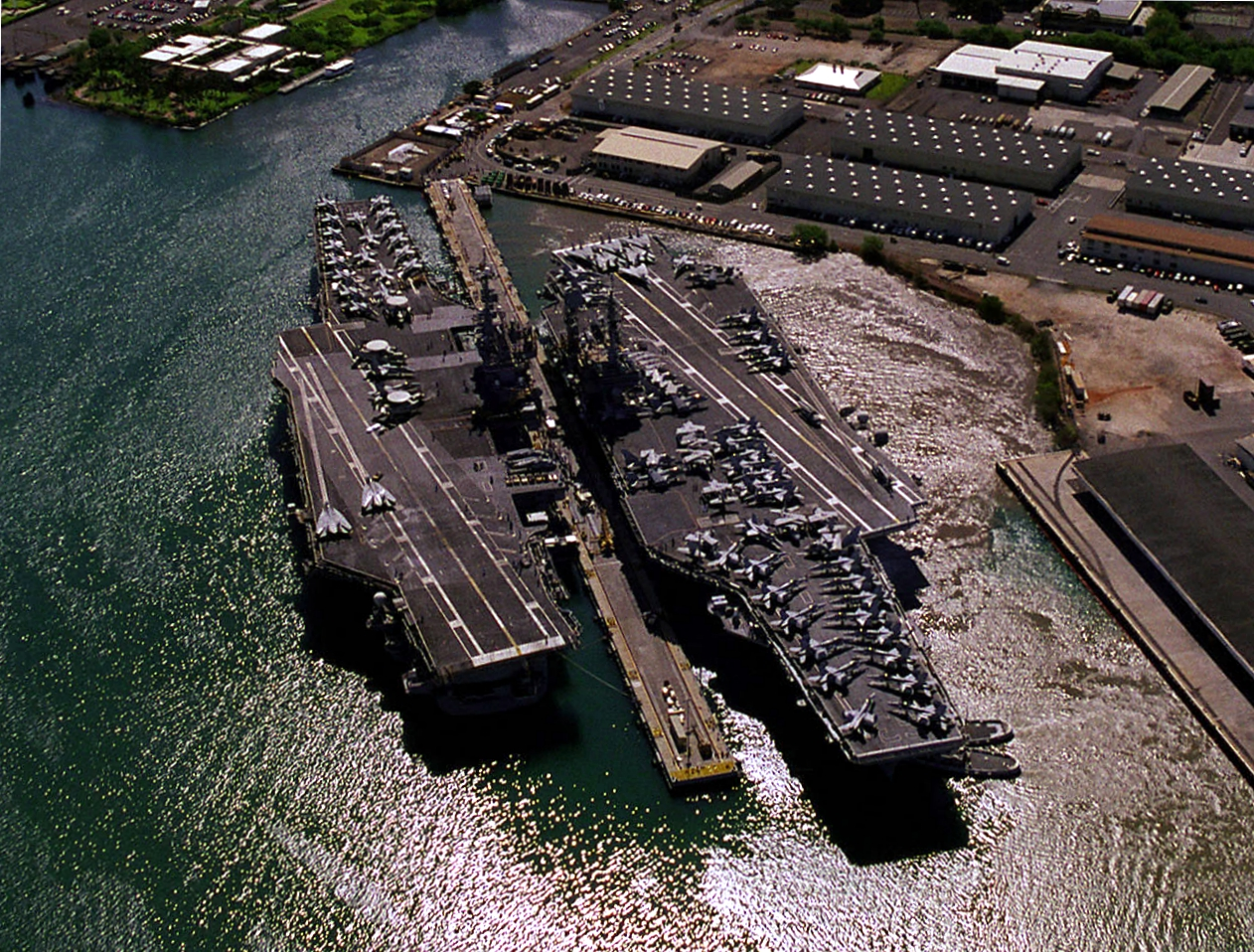
Kitty Hawk (right) relieves Independence at Pearl Harbor as the 7th Fleet forward-deployed carrier

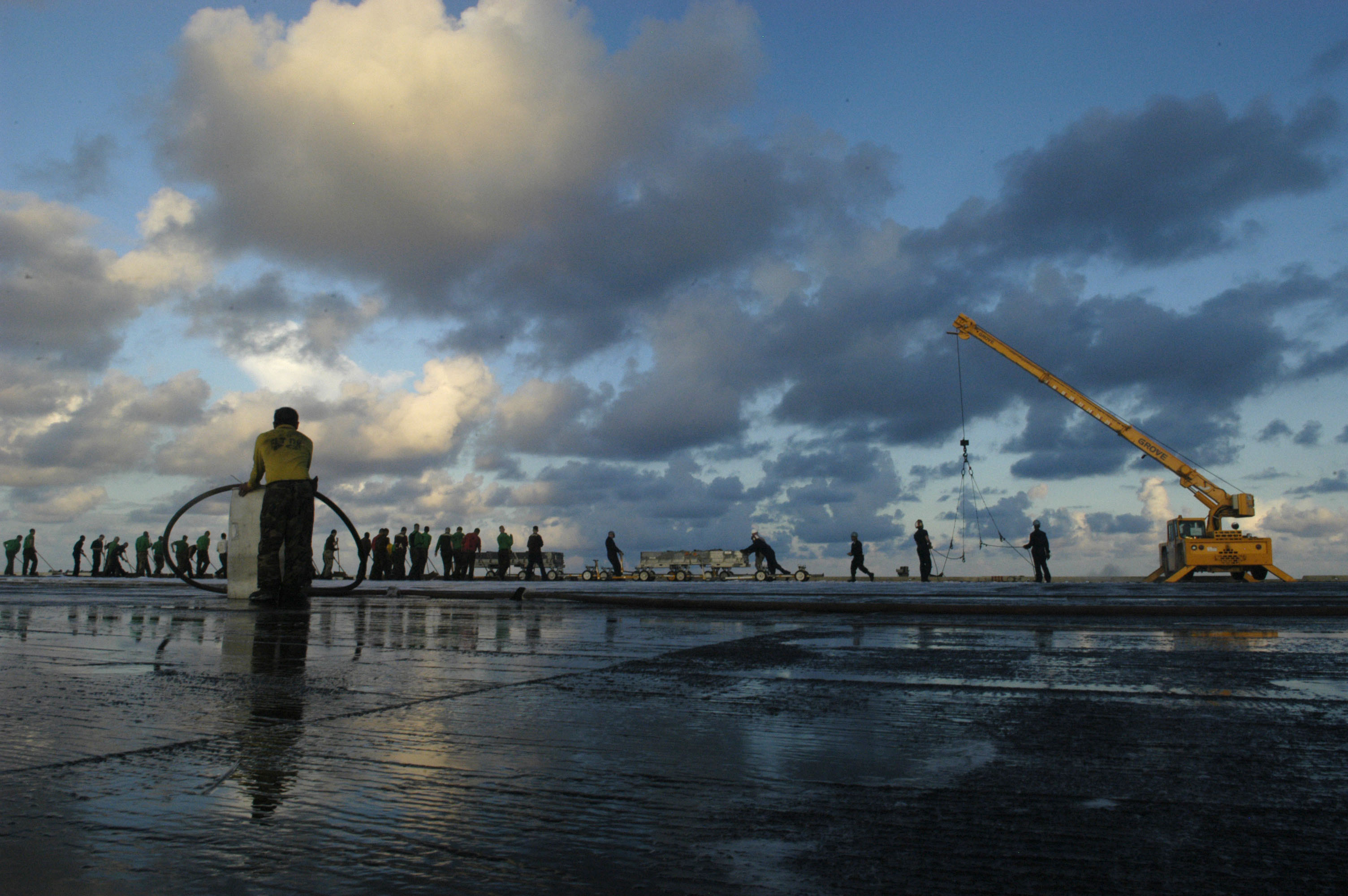
A navy petty officer supervises sailors performing a flight deck scrub down on board Kitty Hawk in August 2005

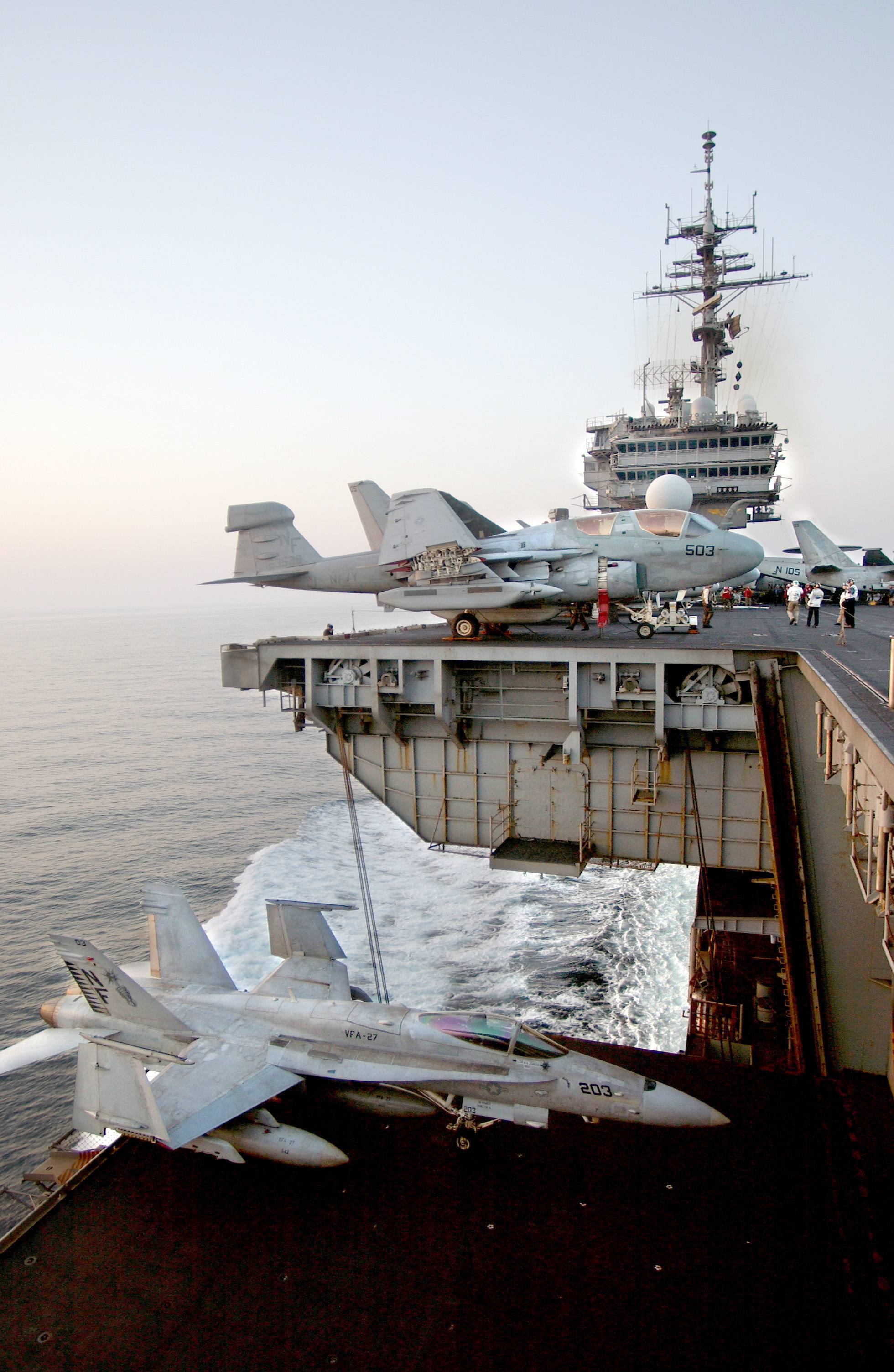
An F/A-18C on the forward elevator on board Kitty Hawk

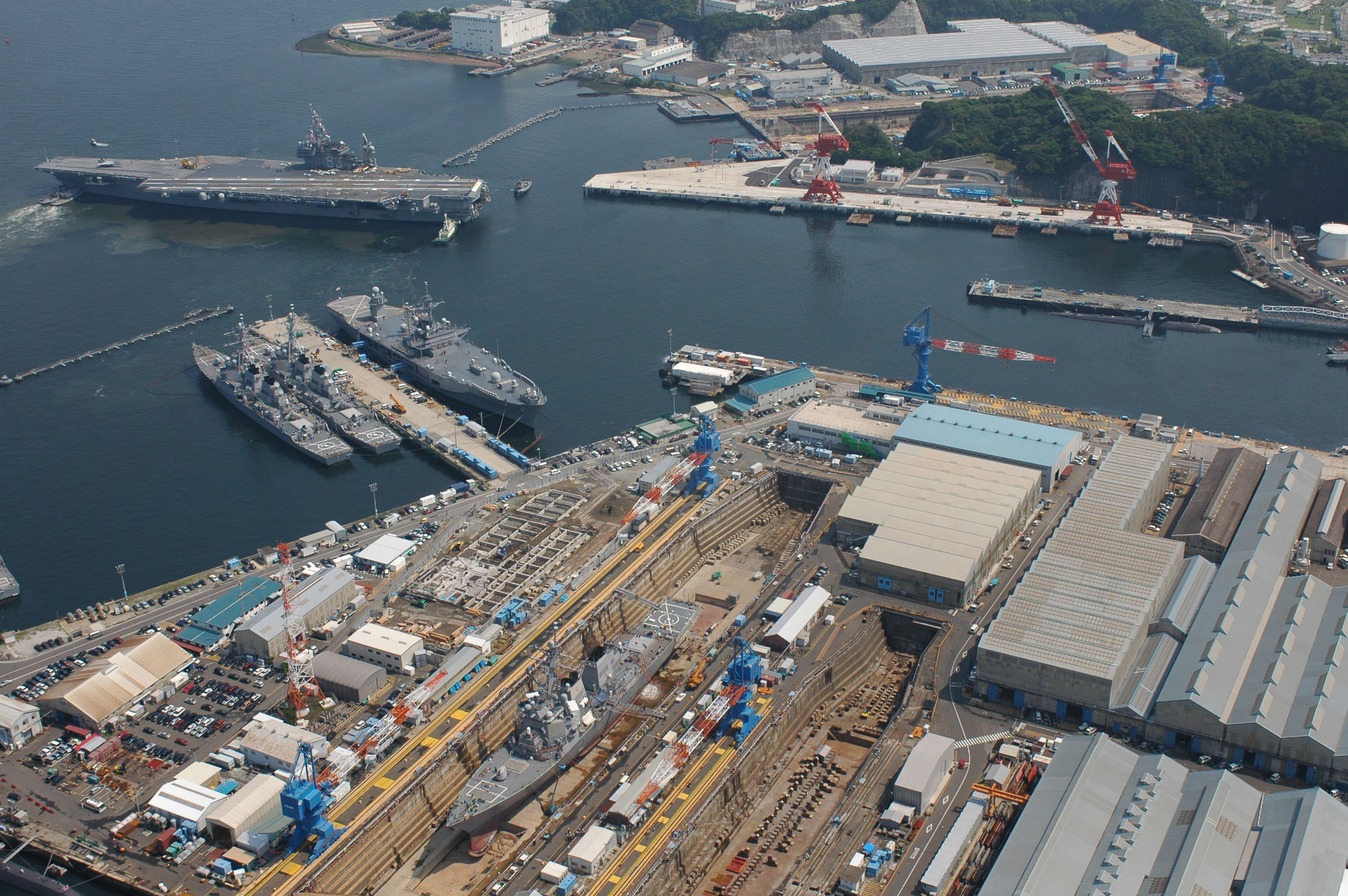
Kitty Hawk docks at the U.S. navy base in Yokosuka, Japan

Kitty Hawk departed San Diego on 6 July 1998, to assume new duties as North America's only permanently forward-deployed aircraft carrier from Independence. Kitty Hawk also welcomed aboard Carrier Air Wing 5, operating from Naval Air Facility Atsugi, Japan. Kitty Hawk arrived at her new operating location of U.S. Fleet Activities Yokosuka, Japan, on 11 August 1998.

With the decommissioning of Independence on 30 September 1998, Kitty Hawk became the second-oldest active warship in the US Navy and was authorized to fly the First Navy Jack.

Kitty Hawk set sail for a planned three-month underway period on 2 March 1999, which included Exercise Tandem Thrust off Guam. Following the exercise, the Kitty Hawk/CVW-5 team was ordered to the Persian Gulf to enforce the No-Fly Zone over Southern Iraq. CVW-5 pilots flew more than 8,800 sorties in 116 days, including 1,300 combat sorties, dropping more than 20 tons of ordnance. On the return trip to Japan, Kitty Hawk made port visits to Fremantle, Western Australia, and Pattaya, Thailand. Kitty Hawk returned to Yokosuka on 25 August 1999. She was again underway to the Sea of Japan on 22 October to participate in Exercises Foal Eagle and AnnualEx 11G.

On 11 April 2000, Kitty Hawk departed Yokosuka, Japan, for routine local area operations and participated in Exercise Cobra Gold with the navies of Singapore and Thailand. Kitty Hawk participated in Exercise Foal Eagle in Fall 2000 and deployed again in March 2001 for a Spring underway period with a historic stop. On 22 March, Kitty Hawk became the first aircraft carrier to ever moor pier-side in Singapore, as the ship visited the brand new Changi Pier, located at the Republic of Singapore Navy's Changi Naval Base. On 29 April, shortly after a visit to Guam, Kitty Hawk celebrated 40 years of active service as the ship and crew sailed south to participate in Exercise Tandem Thrust 2001 with the Australian and Canadian navies. The ship returned to Yokosuka on 11 June 2001.

On 17 October 2000, and again on 9 November 2000, Kitty Hawk was buzzed by a group of Russian warplanes in the Sea of Japan, which proceeded to take pictures of the reaction on deck. General Anatoly Kornukov, then Russian air force's commander in chief, stated that the Russian warplanes managed to evade Kitty Hawk's antiaircraft defense system and that "In the pictures, you can clearly see the panic on deck."

In October 2001, Kitty Hawk deployed to the North Arabian Sea for the beginning of Operation Enduring Freedom. The ship served as an afloat forward staging base for the 160th Special Operations Aviation Regiment, with a reduced air wing.

In April 2002, Kitty Hawk was underway for her scheduled spring training. Along with a Guam port call, the spring underway included port visits to Singapore and Hong Kong, where the crew celebrated Kitty Hawk's 41st birthday. In the fall of 2002, Kitty Hawk was training in the Western Pacific. Kitty Hawk and her battle group combined with U.S. Air Force units and elements of the Japan Maritime Self Defense Force to conduct AnnualEx 14G in the waters surrounding Japan. Later, the ship and her crew made a port visit to Hong Kong.

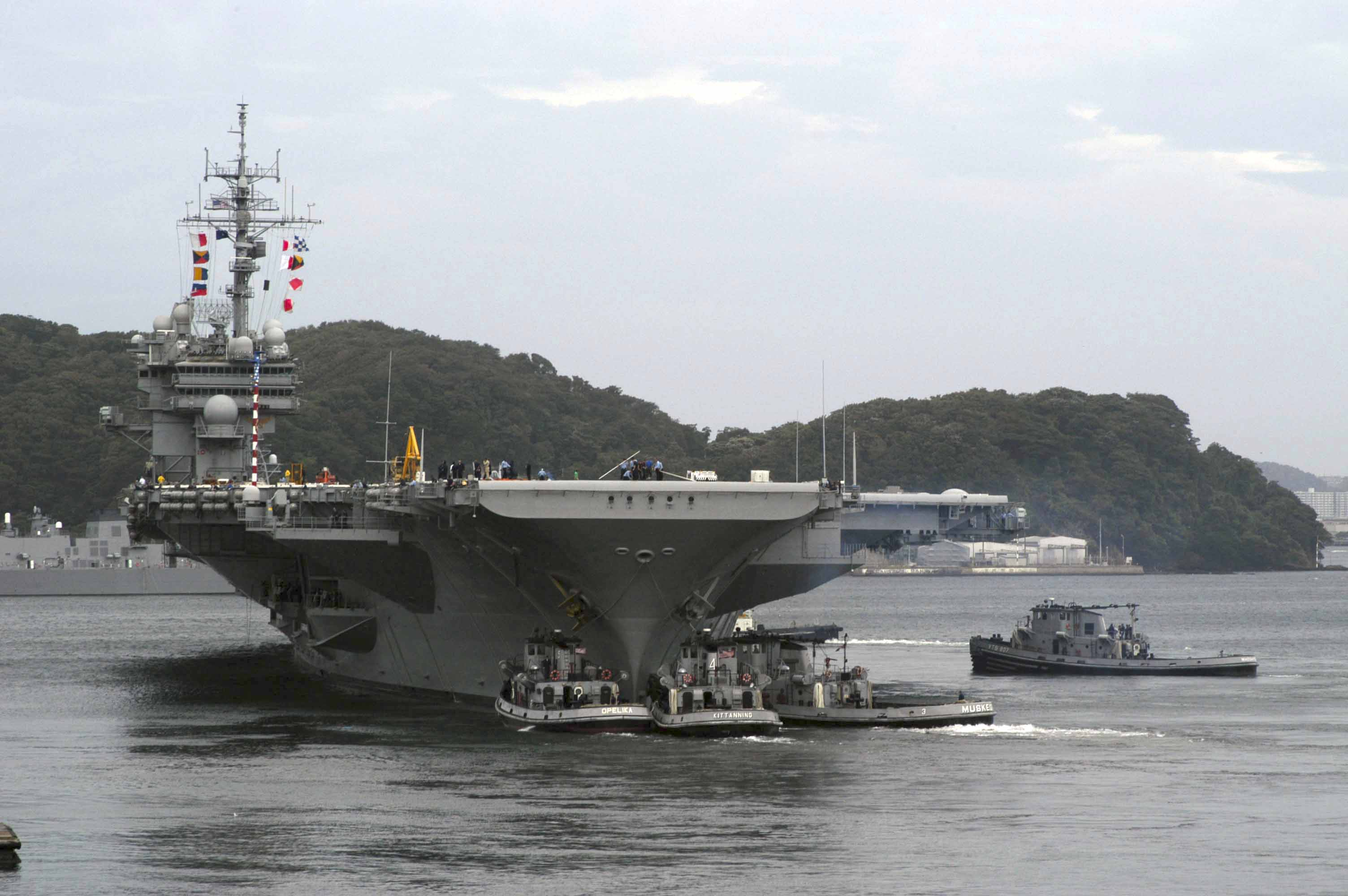
Kitty Hawk is maneuvered into the water following the completion of her five-month maintenance period in 2003

On 11 September 2002, all US Navy ships were ordered to fly the First Navy Jack. The ship once again departed Yokosuka on 23 January 2003 for a routine training mission, but a short time later, orders were received to transit to the U.S. Central Command area of responsibility to support the Global War on Terrorism and to prepare for future contingencies. Kitty Hawk was soon involved in Operations Southern Watch and Iraqi Freedom in the North Persian Gulf. Although the cruise was originally intended to be short, the ship served 110 continuous days at sea. Kitty Hawk returned to Yokosuka on 6 May 2003, immediately entering an extensive drydock period, or drydocking ship's restricted availability (DSRA), that lasted until October of that year.

In 2005 Kitty Hawk participated in the inaugural edititon of Exercise Talisman Saber. In October 2006, Kitty Hawk and her escort warships were undergoing exercises near Okinawa, and a Chinese Song-class submarine shadowed the group then surfaced within 5 mi (8.0 km) of the group on 26 October 2006. It was considered to be quite rare for Chinese subs to operate that far from their home ports on the mainland, though with this incident that may be changing. Reports claim that the submarine had been undetected until it surfaced. In 2009, Timothy J. Keating, commander of the United States Pacific Command, commented on the issue, stating that the carrier was "in a very relaxed posture. If there were some heightened state of tension, we would, believe me, we would not let them get that close."

On 11 January 2007, Kitty Hawk entered a scheduled period of maintenance in Yokosuka, her place being taken by Ronald Reagan which made an unscheduled deployment three weeks later. This refit is "smaller than the one the ship completed [in 2006]", which took six months.

On 5 July 2007, Kitty Hawk arrived at Sydney, Australia, for six days of shore leave after participating in Exercise Talisman Sabre.

On 21 September 2007, Kitty Hawk pulled into Yokosuka, Japan, after a four-month summer deployment.

In November 2007, Kitty Hawk and other US Navy ships participated in the joint military exercise Malabar, in the Bay of Bengal. Other nations that took part were Australia, Japan, Singapore and host nation India. Later that month, Kitty Hawk was scheduled to dock at Hong Kong for Thanksgiving. However, China denied entry to Kitty Hawk and the rest of her carrier group. China then reversed its position based on humanitarian grounds but by that time, Kitty Hawk was too far away to dock in time for the holiday. The cause of the Chinese refusal remains unclear.

Kitty Hawk was deployed off the coast of China along with two other ships during the Taiwan election on 20 March 2008. After the elections, she entered Hong Kong for the last time.

On 28 May 2008, Kitty Hawk departed Japan for the last time, to be replaced in Japan by George Washington. However, during George Washington's transit of the Pacific Coast of South America en route to the planned turnover with Kitty Hawk in Hawaii, a major fire broke out that led to Washington diverting to San Diego for repairs. This led to the US Navy retaining Kitty Hawk in Hawaii to take part in the RIMPAC 2008 exercises in June and July. On 7 August 2008, Kitty Hawk arrived at NAS North Island.

=== Retirement ===
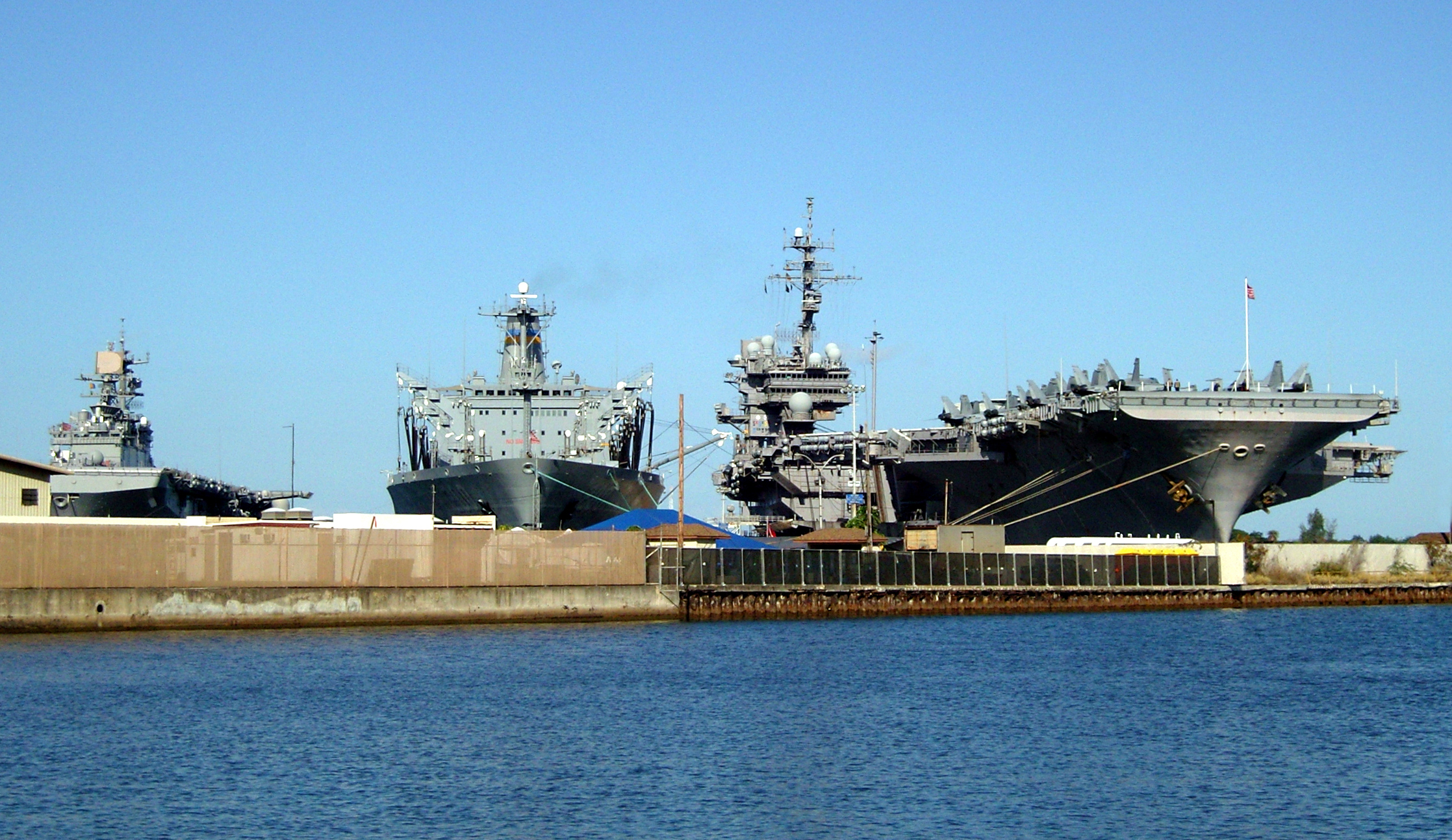
Kitty Hawk in port at Pearl Harbor after participating in RIMPAC exercises in place of the damaged George Washington

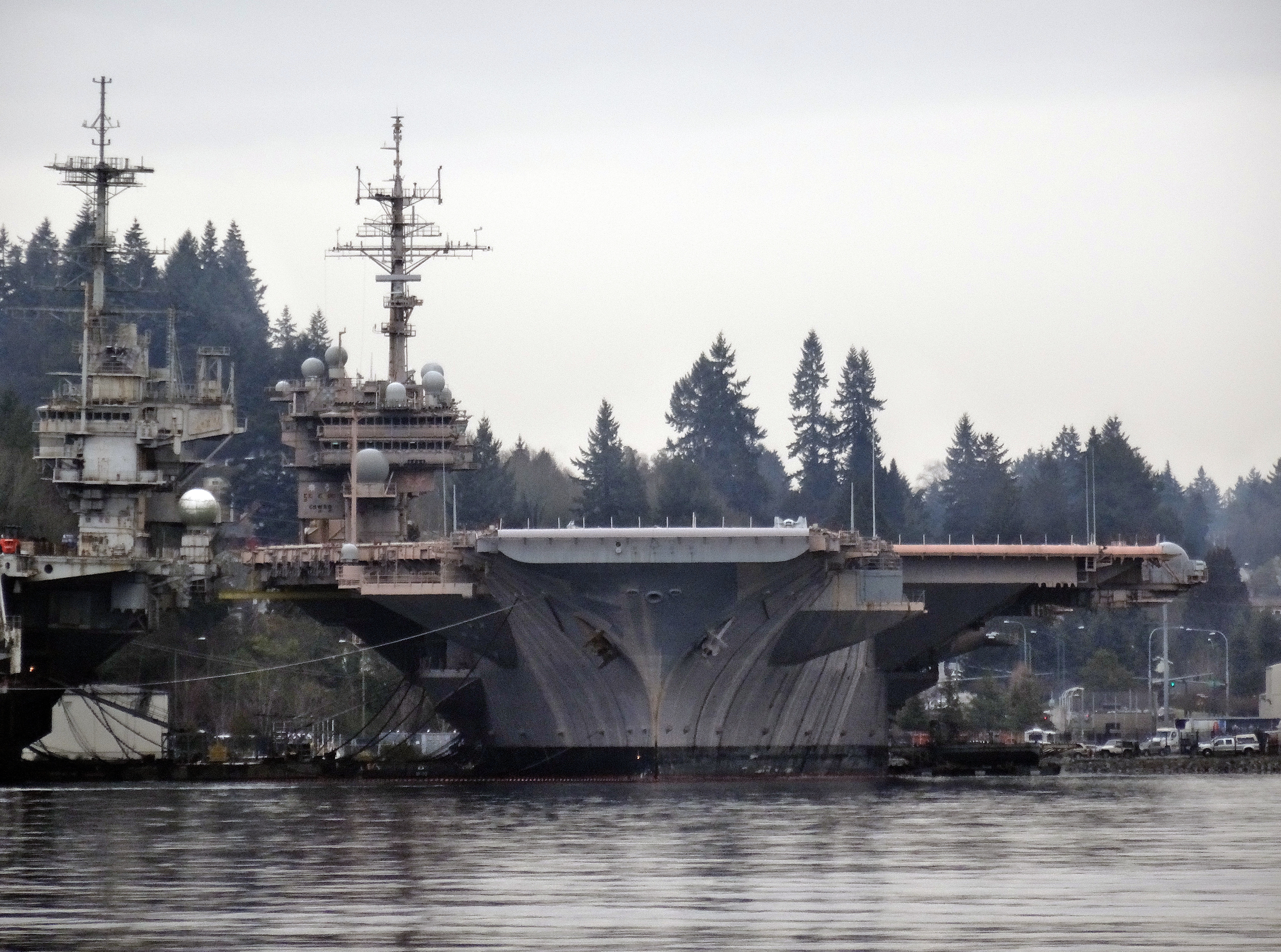
In February 2017, Ex-USS Kitty Hawk moored at Puget Sound Naval Shipyard

On 1 December 2005, the United States Navy announced that George Washington would replace Kitty Hawk in 2008 as the forward-deployed carrier in Japan and it would also assume host carrier duties for forward-deployed Carrier Air Wing 5.

In March 2007, the Navy announced that Captain Todd Zecchin, the captain responsible during the decommissioning of John F. Kennedy, had been tasked with overseeing the decommissioning of Kitty Hawk.

Kitty Hawk left Yokosuka on 28 May 2008 to begin the decommissioning process. However, on 22 May, a fire seriously damaged George Washington, causing the ship to go to San Diego for repairs. Kitty Hawk participated in the RIMPAC exercise near Hawaii in George Washington's place. The turnover between the two carriers was postponed and took place in August. After the turnover, Kitty Hawk arrived at Bremerton, Washington in September and was informally retired on 31 January 2009. Kitty Hawk, the USN's last diesel-fueled aircraft carrier, was finally decommissioned on 12 May 2009.

== Post decommissioning ==
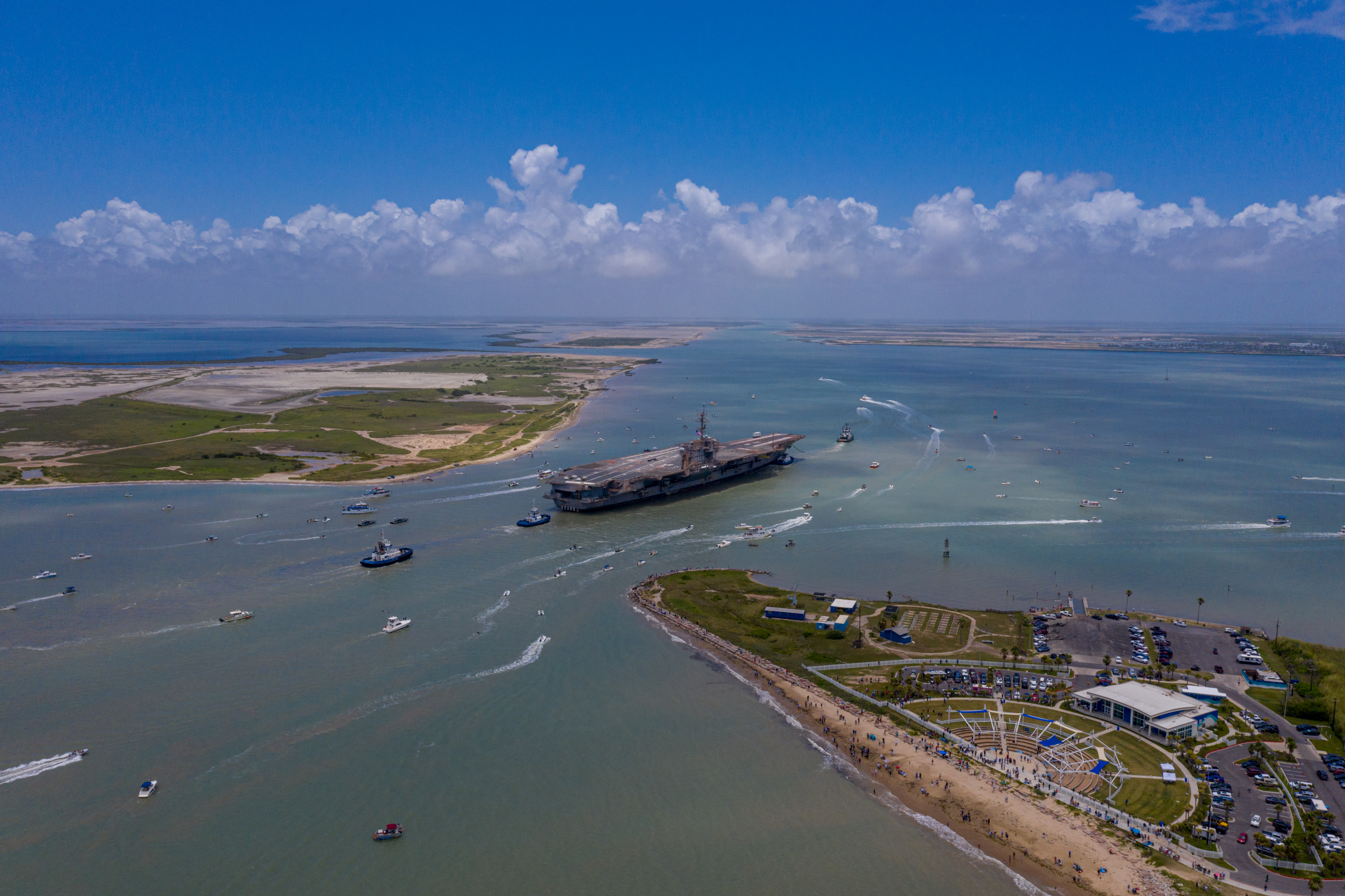
Kitty Hawk being towed past the southern tip of South Padre Island, Texas, by tugboat Michele Foss on 31 May 2022.

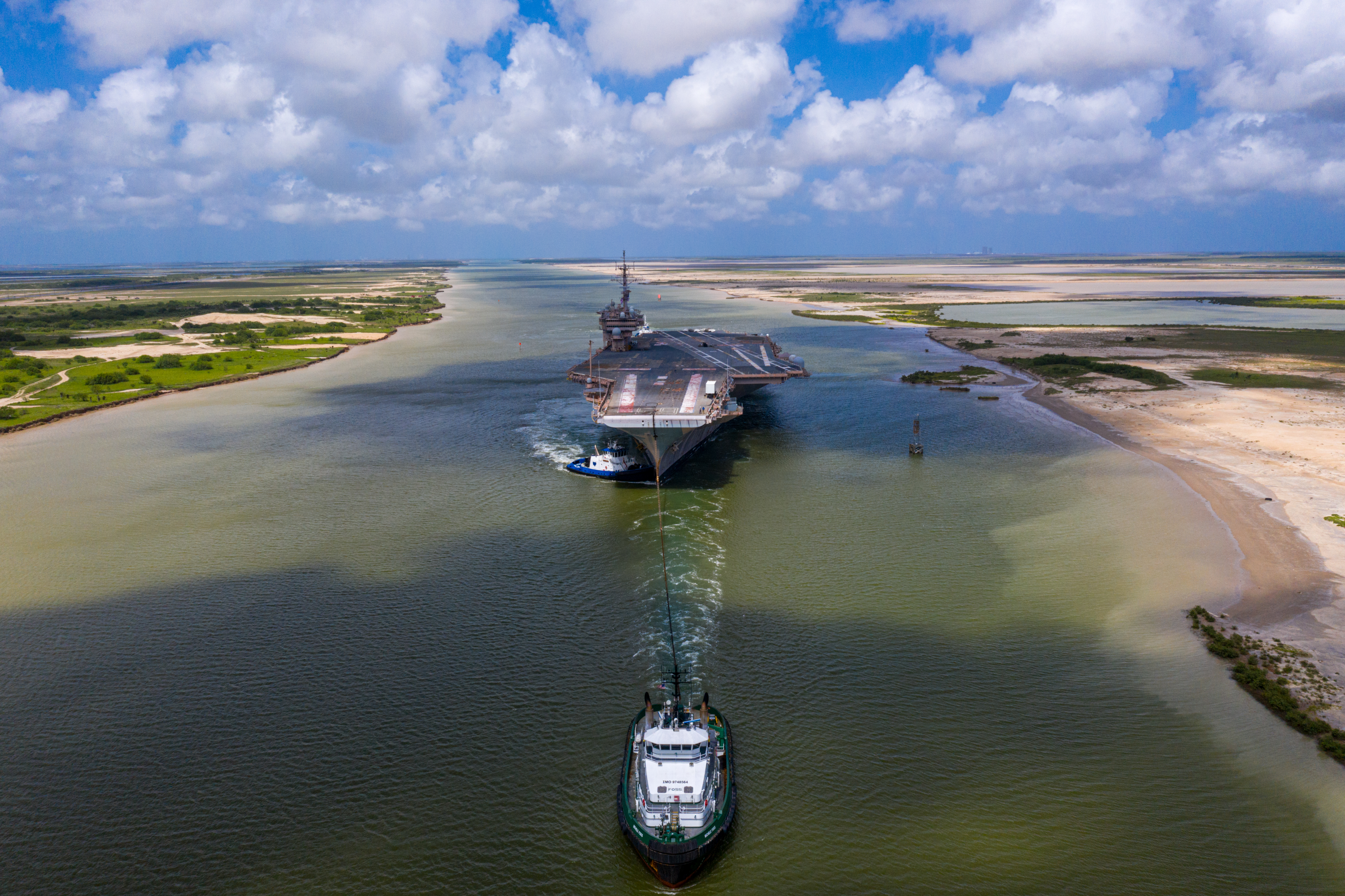
Kitty Hawk being towed in the Brownsville Ship Channel on 31 May 2022.

As the last conventional American aircraft carriers to be decommissioned, Kitty Hawk and John F. Kennedy were the last two carriers suitable for conversion into museum ships. Nuclear carriers, such as Enterprise and the Nimitz class, require extensive disassembly to remove their nuclear reactors during decommissioning, leaving them in an unsuitable condition for donation.

After Kitty Hawk was decommissioned, groups based in Wilmington, North Carolina and Pensacola, Florida lobbied to acquire the ship after her release from the Navy Inactive Ships Program.

By March 2017, the USS Kitty Hawk Veterans Association had raised $5 million in pledges to preserve the aircraft carrier as a museum ship. Members sought to donate $15,000 in memorabilia for display if it came to fruition.

After President Donald Trump gave a speech on board USS Gerald R. Ford and promised to build a 12-carrier navy, US Navy officials extended Kitty Hawk's stay in the reserve inactive fleet and considered the possibility of recommissioning her to help with the buildup.

On 20 October 2017, Kitty Hawk was stricken from the Naval Vessel Register, and on 25 October 2017, the Navy announced its intentions to dispose of her by scrapping.

On 9 March 2021, Kitty Hawk arrived at Puget Sound Naval Shipyard to be put in dry dock and have the hull scraped of marine life before being towed to her final destination.

On 6 October 2021, Kitty Hawk and John F. Kennedy were sold for one cent each to International Shipbreaking Limited.

On 15 January 2022, Kitty Hawk left the Puget Sound Naval Shipyard, under tow, en-route to Brownsville, Texas, for scrapping. As she is too big to transit the Panama Canal, she went instead by way of the Straits of Magellan.

On 31 May 2022, Kitty Hawk arrived in Brownsville, Texas, for scrapping. Scrapping was mostly complete by early 2024, as shown by aerial footage posted online.

It was also announced that the Air Zoo in Kalamazoo, Michigan was donated one of the ship's anchors and several pieces of the flight deck for outside display. This will go on display in June 2024 with help of the USS Kitty Hawk Veterans Association.

== Awards and decorations ==
Awarded to Kitty Hawk:

Presidential Unit Citation		Joint Meritorious Unit Award
Navy Unit Commendation with 5 stars	Meritorious Unit Commendation with 2 stars	Navy E Ribbon with 3 Battle 'E' Devices
Navy Expeditionary Medal with 3 stars	National Defense Service Medal with 2 stars	Armed Forces Expeditionary Medal with 15 stars
Vietnam Service Medal with 16 stars	Southwest Asia Service Medal with 1 star	Global War on Terrorism Expeditionary Medal
Global War on Terrorism Service Medal	Humanitarian Service Medal with 1 star	Sea Service Deployment Ribbon with 17 stars
Navy/Marine Corps Overseas Service Ribbon with 9 stars	Republic of Vietnam Gallantry Cross Unit Citation	Republic of Vietnam Campaign Medal

== See also ==
- List of aircraft carriers of the United States Navy
- Stop Our Ship - USS Kitty Hawk - Antiwar campaign directed at the USS Kitty Hawk

== Bibliography ==
- Friedman, Norman (1995). "United States of America". In Chesneau, Roger (ed.). Conway's All the World's Fighting Ships 1922–1946. Annapolis: Naval Institute Press. ISBN 1-55750-132-7.

Preceded by USS Independence (CV-62)	Oldest active combat ship of the United States Navy; 1998–2009	Succeeded by USS Enterprise (CVN-65)
