= Bob Jackson =

Bob Jackson may refer to:

- Bob Jackson (American football) (born 1940), former professional American football running back
- Bob Jackson (football manager), manager of the English football club Portsmouth F.C., 1947–1952
- Bob Jackson (footballer, born 1934), English footballer
- Bob Jackson (Kentucky politician) (born 1962), member of the Kentucky Senate
- Robert Jackson (Canadian politician) (born 1936), known as Bob
- Bob Jackson (musician) (born 1949), keyboardist/guitarist
- Bob Jackson (priest) (born 1949), retired Anglican archdeacon and consultant on church growth
- Bob Jackson (swimmer) (born 1957), former international backstroke swimmer
- Robert H. Jackson (photographer) (born 1934), known as Bob, photographer of Jack Ruby shooting Lee Harvey Oswald
- Bob Jackson (rugby league) (born 1940), Australian rugby league footballer

== See also ==
- Robert Jackson (disambiguation)
- Bobby Jackson (disambiguation)
