= Bobby Jackson (disambiguation) =

Bobby Jackson (born 1973), is an American former basketball player.

Bobby Jackson may also refer to:

- Bobby Jackson (cornerback) (born 1956), American football cornerback
- Bobby Jackson (American football coach) (born 1940), American football coach
- Bobby Jackson (defensive back) (1936–2009), American football defensive back

== See also ==
- Bob Jackson (disambiguation)
- Robert Jackson (disambiguation)
