= Robert W. Jackson =

U.S. Naval officer

Robert William Jackson (born March 18, 1959) is a US Navy veteran who served as a second class petty officer on the USS Kitty Hawk and became a whistleblower. In the eighties, Jackson denounced the use of the USS Kitty Hawk to sell F-14 parts and missiles to Iran illegally. Later, it was discovered that this ring of smugglers was part of a wider operation involving three different US Navy carriers, and an essential part of a more significant conspiracy, later referred to as the Iran–Contra affair.

On October 1, 1985, Jackson testified before the House Sea Power Subcommittee, sharing 2,000 pages of Navy documents that showed evidence of fraud, forgery, and kickbacks aboard the aircraft carrier Kitty Hawk. The panel was chaired by Rep. Charles Bennet. Testifying along with Jackson were Rep. Jim Bates (D-San Diego) and Commodore James B. Whittaker, the Navy's assistant commander for inventory and systems integrity.

Jackson's accusations crossed path with an open FBI investigation, which arrested seven suspects. These included an aviation storekeeper on the helicopter ship Belleau Wood, two Navy employees, a civilian warehouse worker, and an aviation storekeeper on the aircraft carrier Kitty Hawk. Other than that, three civilians and an Iranian based in London also were arrested. Besides Kitty Hawk and Belleau Wood, a third aircraft carrier based on the West Coast was also involved. At the time, the case was considered the first time a hostile country has penetrated the Pentagon's supply system.

In August 1985, US District Judge Earl B. Gilliam issued a broad gag order to prevent the seven people charged with stealing the F-14 fighter parts from the Navy and smuggling them to Iran from discussing the case. But the gag order was also applied to defense attorneys, federal prosecutors, and potential witnesses, which sealed Jackson's allegations and kept the story hidden from public.

Jackson's accusations were later revealed in two different books: Robert Jackson's memoirs, named Running Scared, and a book called The Documents Behind Running Scared.

== Early life and Navy career ==
Jackson was born on March 18, 1959, in Bakersfield, California. He is the fourth child down in an eight-child family. After graduating from Highland High School in 1977, he joined the United States Navy. Jackson served in the US Navy from August 1977 to April 1983, and later from August 1983 to August 1985.

Jackson's father, Jim Jackson, was a self-employed petroleum engineer who served three years in the Navy. His mother died of brain cancer in 1980, when Robert was in his early twenties.

His first tour of duty was at HSL-36 in Mayport, Florida, as an aviation anti-submarine warfare operator (today's aviation warfare systems operator) and a search and rescue aircrewman (SAR) wet crewman (swimmer). He then went to the Navy Reserves, where he was stationed at Pt. Magu, California, in VP-65.

In 1980, after leaving the Navy, Jackson began selling life and health insurance in Jacksonville and at Mutual of Omaha. After a troubled marriage and a divorce that left him broke, he re-enlisted in the US Navy as a third-class petty officer. After advanced training, Jackson was stationed on the USS Kitty Hawk, in September 1983. At the time, the USS Kitty Hawk was homeported in San Diego, California.

Initially, Jackson was assigned to the Anti-submarine Warfare Module (ASWMOD). One month later, he was given the collateral duty of divisional supply petty officer. After a mess-up in the supply records, Jackson was sent to Supply to learn about the Navy Supply system on his off time. In six months, Jackson had the Navy Supply system down so well he began teaching other divisional supply petty officers, chiefs, and officers. He was awarded a promotion to second-class petty officer before being sent temporarily assigned duties (TAD) to Supply. He was finally sent to the S-1 Financial Office to be the ship's senior Supply & Equipage (S&E) auditor.

== Historical Background: The Iranian Hostage Crisis ==
Before the Iranian Revolution in 1979, the United States was the largest seller of arms to Iran under Mohammad Reza Pahlavi. Because of that, the vast majority of the weapons that the Islamic Republic of Iran inherited in January 1979 were American-made.

In November 1979, a group of Iranian college students belonging to the Muslim Student Followers of the Imam's Line took over the US Embassy in Tehran, taking 66 Americans hostage. After an initial release, fifty-two diplomats and citizens were held hostage for 444 days, in what became known as the Iran hostage crisis.

The American response was to halt oil export from Iran and freeze Iranian government assets and investments. President Carter ordered a military rescue mission, codenamed Operation Eagle Claw, which was a total failure.

In consequence of the hostage crisis, US sanctions were imposed in 1979 by Executive Order 12170. The set of US sanctions included a trade and arms embargo. Part of these sanctions was lifted in January 1981 as part of the Algiers Accords, a set of agreements between the United States and Iran to resolve the Iran hostage crisis. By these accords, the US pledged that it "is and from now on will be the policy of the United States not to intervene, directly or indirectly, politically or militarily, in Iran’s internal affairs."

In the spring of 1983, the United States launched Operation Staunch, a wide-ranging diplomatic effort to persuade other nations all over the world not to sell arms or spare parts for weapons to Iran. To all effects, Iran was still considered a hostile country in the 1980s. This arms embargo took place during the Iran-Iraq war (1980–1988), a war in which the US sided with Iraq. On the record. the US could not, and was not, selling any weapons or military equipment to Iran.

== The USS Kitty Hawk incident ==
In September 1983, Petty Officer Jackson reported to the Kitty Hawk's antisubmarine warfare division. During his time on board, he became the division's bookkeeper. After several months of intense study, Jackson had the Kitty Hawk's arcane bookkeeping system fully deciphered. In his evaluation for June to December 1984, Jackson was given a 4.0 rating, the Navy's highest mark. “Petty Officer Jackson’s high levels of initiative and personal performance,” the Navy report stated, “far exceed those expected of a junior petty officer.” He was given increasing accounting responsibilities until the incident. By late December 1984, he was overseeing more than 250 bookkeepers.

Over time, Jackson realized that the carrier's supply system didn't work the way it supposed to, having found evidence of fraud, corruption, theft, and waste. A significant part of the items that were logged on the books either didn't stay aboard very long or never arrived. According to Jackson, he and his colleagues were commonly ordered to fill out “survey forms” wrongfully stating that equipment had been lost or damaged. According to Jackson's allegations, in some cases, the items had been thrown in the middle of the ocean. In one of the incidents reported by Jackson, Kitty Hawk sailors were able to illegally requisition 31 nine-pound silver bars, worth about $535 each. The scam was first discovered by authorities when one of the sailors was caught trying to trade one of those silver bars for drugs.

After conducting a full audit on the ship, Petty Officer Jackson found out that more than $1 million worth of military equipment was missing from the USS Kitty Hawk. When he brought that information to his superior officers, he was ignored by his superiors and intimidated by his fellow mates. One of his sailors ended up arrested after threatening to break Jackson "into little pieces and throw [him] into the screws of the ship." Later, Jackson presented documents and evidence to the Naval Investigative Service that the missing parts were funneled by an international theft ring that shipped spare parts of F-14 fighter planes to Iran. After providing the names of 30 sailors involved in theft or fraud within the ship's supply system, Jackson was ordered to return to the same ship where the smugglers where serving.

Receiving death threats and being ignored by Navy authorities, Jackson decided to blow the whistle and took the case to the press. His story was published in the LA Times by the journalist Glenn F. Bunting (https://www.gfbunting.com/), in a series of pieces printed from July 1985 to February 1986. Initially, the Navy denied the accusations. Like many whistleblowers, Jackson's motivations were publicly questioned, and his integrity was challenged. He was labeled as "a zealot" and a "troublemaker," with news articles smearing his reputation and exposing details about his troubled marriage, religious beliefs, work ethics, and even his high school grades.

A 3 1/2-month Navy investigation of incidents on board the aircraft carrier Kitty Hawk produced a 12-inch-thick report, where the Navy concluded that "$10-million inventory was missing because of accounting errors and computer problems." Nevertheless, the Navy report stated that there was no evidence of "fraud, waste or mismanagement." According to People magazine, in July 1985, the Navy announced that it could not account for about $14 million worth of Kitty Hawk supplies.

In the end, a Federal investigation revealed the truth about what happened on the USS Kitty Hawk. After Petty Officer Jackson presented 2,000 pages of documents, the FBI arrested seven people involved in the scheme to smuggle Navy F-14 fighter parts and Phoenix missiles to Iran.

Following the incident, Petty Officer Jackson quit the Navy in September 1985. On October 1, 1985, he testified before the US Congress with Congressman Jim Bates. Bates presented his findings to a Congressional Subcommittee. He reported that $10 million parts were missing from the USS Kitty Hawk and that another $10 million could not be accounted for, in a total of $20 million. On that occasion, Bates raised the suspicion that an espionage ring was using the USS Kitty Hawk to dispatch F-14 parts to Iran and called it a spy scandal. Bates also stated that the Naval Investigative Service seemed to be doing more covering up than uncovering the problem.

In the 1980s, the F-14 aircraft served as the U.S. Navy's primary maritime air superiority fighter. F-14s were also used as land-based interceptors by the Islamic Republic of Iran Air Force during the Iran–Iraq War, where they saw combat against Iraqi warplanes. Iranian F-14s reportedly shot down at least 160 Iraqi aircraft during the war, while only 12 to 16 Tomcats were lost. Considering that the US was supposed to be allied with Iraq – and having in mind that it was against the US foreign policy to sell any weapons to Iran at that time – Bates' accusations were pretty serious.

During his Congressional testimony, Jackson stated that:

The supply system aboard the Kitty Hawk is in shambles and I don't say the word because I want to, I say shambles because it is true, what I feel it is true. What I found was a computer system that was flawed to such an extent that nobody knew how much money they were actually spending.

This is the core of what I found. There was no training, auditing or reporting program on the Kitty Hawk for divisional supply petty officers to help them learn how to audit their checkbooks. That weakness allowed certain people within the supply system to manipulate the supply's system computer to cover up the theft's of aircraft and missile parts to Iran.

Why did I go to the Congress and the Senate, to Congressman Hunter and Congressman Bates? You know, I tried to follow the chain of command. I found out it didn't work. I tried to disclose what I discovered to the Naval Investigative Service and I found out they don't work. My life had been threatened and I needed help.

Based on a broad gag order issued to prevent the seven people charged with stealing the F-14 fighter parts from the Navy and smuggling them to Iran from discussing the case, Congress decided to seal Jackson's allegations and kept the story hidden from public. Only one year after Jackson's testimony, on November 3, 1986, the Lebanese magazine Ash-Shiraa exposed the existence of a secret agreement between the US Government and the Islamic Republic of Iran to illegally sell weapons to the latter, in what later was known as the Iran-Contra affair. The Iranian government confirmed the Ash-Shiraa story, and, on November 13, President Reagan appeared on national television, stating:

My purpose was ... to send a signal that the United States was prepared to replace the animosity between [the U.S. and Iran] with a new relationship ... At the same time we undertook this initiative, we made clear that Iran must oppose all forms of international terrorism as a condition of progress in our relationship. The most significant step which Iran could take, we indicated, would be to use its influence in Lebanon to secure the release of all hostages held there.

Nevertheless, the full scope of the operation was more complex than merely selling weapons for hostages. On October 5, 1986, one month before the Ash-Shiraa article, a transport aircraft delivering weapons via clandestine airdrop to the Nicaraguan Contras was shot down over Nicaragua by a surface-to-air missile. Two U.S. pilots – Wallace "Buzz" Sawyer and William Cooper – were piloting the Corporate Air Services HPF821 and died on the crash. The pilots were transporting weapons into Nicaragua, and the Nicaraguan government accused the US of using the CIA to aid the opposition guerrillas, the so-called "Contras." That would constitute a direct violation of the Boland Amendmentt, which prohibited the American government from intervening in Nicaragua. So, that accusation was largely denied by the CIA, the Pentagon, and the US Government.

During the Iran-Contra investigation, it came to light that the CIA was, in fact, illegally selling weapons, airplane parts and missiles to Iran in exchange for off-the-records money and firearms, which were then used to supply the Contras in Nicaragua. This was a double violation of US foreign policy, as the US government was prohibited both from selling weapons to Iran and from interfering in Nicaragua's political situation.

The Tower Commission also stated that "using the Contras as a front, and against international law, and US law, weapons were sold, using Israel as intermediaries, to Iran, during the brutal Iran–Iraq War. The US was also supplying weapons to Iraq, including ingredients for nerve gas, mustard gas and other chemical weapons."

The Iran-Contra affair was one of the biggest arms scandals of the 1980s. It resulted in indictments involving authorities as such as the Secretary of Defense, Caspar Weinberger; Oliver North, member of the National Security Council; Alan D. Fiers, Chief of the CIA's Central American Task Force; Clair George, Chief of Covert Ops-CIA; Robert C. McFarlane, National Security Adviser; among others.
